= List of airports by ICAO code: EH-EY =

List of airports by ICAO code: A - B - C - D - EB-EG - EH-EY - FA-FM - FN-FZ - G - H - ~~I~~ - J - KA-KH - KI-KP - KR-KZ - LA-LJ - LK-LZ - M - N - O - P - Q - R - SA-SC - SD-SH - SI - SJ - SK-SM - SN-SP - SQ - SS-SU - SV-SY - T - U - V - W - ~~X~~ - YA-YG - YH-YQ - YR-YZ - Z

== EH – Netherlands ==
Also see airport category and list.

| ICAO | IATA | Airport name | Community | Province or territory | Coordinates | Notes |
|---|---|---|---|---|---|---|
| EHAL | | Ameland Airport | Ballum | Friesland | 53°27′06″N 005°40′38″E | |
| EHAM | AMS | Amsterdam Airport Schiphol | Haarlemmermeer, near Amsterdam | North-Holland | 52°18′29″N 004°45′51″E | |
| EHBD | | Budel Airport | Weert | Limburg | 51°15′16″N 005°36′03″E | |
| EHBK | MST | Maastricht Aachen Airport | Beek | Limburg | 50°54′57″N 005°46′37″E | |
| EHDL | | Deelen Airbase | Deelen | Gelderland | 52°03′33″N 005°52′38″E | |
| EHDP | | De Peel Airbase | Venray | Limburg | 51°31′04″N 005°51′34″E | |
| EHDR | | Drachten Airfield | Drachten | Friesland | 53°07′05″N 006°07′45″E | |
| EHEH | EIN | Eindhoven Airport | Eindhoven | Brabant | 51°27′00″N 005°22′28″E | |
| EHGG | GRQ | Groningen Airport Eelde | Eelde | Drenthe | 53°07′30″N 006°35′00″E | |
| EHGR | GLZ | Gilze-Rijen Airbase | Gilze and Rijen | North-Brabant | 51°34′06″N 004°55′36″E | |
| EHHA | | Amsterdam Heliport | Amsterdam | North-Holland | 52°24′56″N 004°48′01″E | |
| EHHE | | Eemshaven Heliport | Het Hogeland | Groningen | 53°27′39″N 006°48′52″E | |
| EHHO | | Hoogeveen Airfield | Hoogeveen | Drenthe | 52°43′51″N 006°30′58″E | |
| EHHV | | Hilversum Airfield | Hilversum | North-Holland | 52°11′31″N 005°08′49″E | |
| EHJR | | K13-A Oil Platform Heliport | | Offshore | 53°13′02″N 003°13′08″E | |
| EHKD | DHR | De Kooy Airfield | De Kooy | North-Holland | 52°55′28″N 004°46′51″E | |
| EHLE | LEY | Lelystad Airport | Lelystad | Flevoland | 52°27′37″N 005°31′38″E | |
| EHLW | LWR | Leeuwarden Air Base | Leeuwarden | Friesland | 53°13′40″N 005°45′36″E | |
| EHMC; EHML | | Air Operations Control Station Nieuw-Milligen | Apeldoorn | Gelderland | 52°14′07″N 005°45′00″E | |
| EHMM | | Vliegveld Middenmeer | Middenmeer | Noord-Holland | 52°49′00″N 005°01′40″E | |
| EHMZ | | Midden-Zeeland Airport | Middelburg | Zeeland | 51°30′44″N 003°43′52″E | |
| EHND | | Numansdorp Airfield | Numansdorp | South-Holland | 51°45′11″N 004°27′19″E | |
| EHOW | | Oostwold Airport | Scheemda | Groningen | 53°12′29″N 007°01′54″E | |
| EHRD | RTM | Rotterdam The Hague Airport | Rotterdam | South-Holland | 51°57′25″N 004°26′14″E | |
| ~~EHSB~~ | SSB | Soesterberg Air Base | Soesterberg | Utrecht | 52°07′39″N 005°16′26″E | Closed in 2015 as transferred into National Military Museum |
| EHSE | | Breda International Airport | Hoeven | North-Brabant | 51°33′17″N 004°33′09″E | |
| EHST | | Stadskanaal Airfield | Stadskanaal | Groningen | 52°59′55″N 007°01′22″E | |
| EHTE | | Teuge International Airport | Deventer | Overijssel | 52°14′41″N 006°02′48″E | |
| EHTL | | Terlet Airfield | Terlet | Gelderland | 52°03′26″N 005°55′28″E | |
| EHTP | | Maasvlakte Heliport | Rotterdam | South-Holland | 51°57′34″N 004°05′24″E | |
| EHTW | ENS | Enschede Airport Twente | Enschede | Overijssel | 52°16′33″N 006°53′21″E | |
| EHTX | | Texel International Airport | Texel | North-Holland | 53°06′55″N 004°50′01″E | |
| ~~EHVB~~ | | Valkenburg Airbase | Valkenburg | South-Holland | 52°10′00″N 004°25′09″E | Closed circa 2000 |
| ~~EHVE~~ | | ~~TrafficPort Venlo~~ | Venlo | Limburg | 51°23′35″N 006°03′46″E | Closed |
| EHVK | UDE | Volkel Airbase | Uden | North-Brabant | 51°39′26″N 005°41′34″E | |
| EHVL | | Vlieland Heliport | Oost-Vlieland | Frisia | 53°17′48″N 005°05′09″E | |
| EHWO | WOE | Woensdrecht Air Base | Woensdrecht | North-Brabant | 51°26′56″N 004°20′30″E | |
| ~~EHYB~~ | | Ypenburg Airport | The Hague | South-Holland | 52°02′28″N 004°21′25″E | Closed in 1991 |
| EHYP | | IJmuiden Heliport | IJmuiden | North-Holland | 52°28′12″N 004°35′42″E | |

== EI – Ireland ==
Also see airport category and list.

| ICAO | IATA | Airport name | Community | Province or territory | Coordinates | Notes |
|---|---|---|---|---|---|---|
| EIAB | | Abbeyshrule Aerodrome | Abbeyshrule | County Longford | 53°35′29″N 007°38′34″W | |
| EIBB | | Ballyboughal Airfield | Ballyboughal | County Dublin | 53°30′21″N 006°14′16″W | |
| EIBN | BYT | Bantry Aerodrome | Bantry | County Cork | 51°40′08″N 009°29′04″W | |
| EIBR | | Birr Aerodrome | Birr | County Offaly | 53°04′15″N 007°53′55″W | |
| EIBT | | Belmullet Aerodrome | Belmullet | County Mayo | 54°13′22″N 010°01′51″W | |
| EICA | NNR | Connemara Regional Airport | Inverin | Connemara | 53°13′50″N 009°28′04″W | |
| EICB | | Castlebar Airport | Castlebar | County Mayo | 53°50′54″N 009°16′49″W | |
| EICK | ORK | Cork International Airport | Cork | | 51°50′29″N 008°29′28″W | |
| EICL | | Clonbullogue Aerodrome | Clonbullogue | County Offaly | 53°14′59″N 007°07′24″W | |
| EICM | GWY | Galway Airport | Carnmore | County Galway | 53°18′01″N 008°56′28″W | |
| EICN | | Coonagh Airport | Limerick | County Limerick | 52°39′59″N 008°40′55″W | |
| EICS | | Castleforbes Airport | Longford | County Longford | 53°46′42″N 007°50′07″W | Closed |
| EIDL | CFN | Donegal Airport | Carrickfinn | County Donegal | 55°02′39″N 008°20′28″W | |
| EIDW | DUB | Dublin Airport | Dublin | | 53°25′17″N 006°16′12″W | |
| EIER | | Erinagh Airfield | Nenagh | County Tipperary | 52°48′45″N 008°16′56″W | |
| EIFT | | Fethard Airstrip | Carrick-on-Suir | County Tipperary | 52°28′18″N 007°44′05″W | |
| EIGM | | Gormanston Aerodrome | Laytown-Bettystown-Mornington | County Meath | 53°38′43″N 006°13′48″W | Closed |
| EIHN | | Hacketstown Aerodrome | Tullow | County Carlow | 52°51′18″N 006°32′50″W | |
| EIIB | | Inishbofin Airfield | Conamara | County Galway | 53°37′10″N 010°12′39″W | |
| EIIM | IOR | Inishmore Aerodrome (Kilronan Airport) | Kilronan | County Galway | 53°06′25″N 009°39′14″W | |
| EIIR | | Inisheer Aerodrome | Conamara | County Galway | 53°03′53″N 009°30′39″W | |
| EIKH | | Kilrush Airfield | Athy | County Kildare | 53°03′45″N 006°51′32″W | |
| EIKI | | Killenaule Airport | Carrick-on-Suir | County Tipperary | 52°37′59″N 007°37′59″W | Closed |
| EIKK | KKY | Kilkenny Airport | Kilkenny | County Kilkenny | 52°39′03″N 007°17′46″W | |
| EIKN | NOC | Ireland West Airport | Knock | County Mayo | 53°54′37″N 008°49′07″W | |
| EIKY | KIR | Kerry Airport | Farranfore | County Kerry | 52°10′51″N 009°31′26″W | |
| EILT | LKY | Letterkenny Airfield | Letterkenny | County Donegal | 54°57′05″N 007°40′22″W | |
| EIME | | Casement Aerodrome | Baldonnel | | 53°18′06″N 006°27′04″W | |
| EIMG | | Moneygall Aerodrome | Thurles | County Tipperary | 52°51′00″N 007°58′59″W | Closed |
| EIMH | | Athboy Airfield | Athboy | County Meath | 53°38′16″N 006°52′43″W | |
| EIMN | | Inishmaan Aerodrome | Conamara | County Galway | 53°05′35″N 009°34′05″W | |
| EIMY | | Moyne Aerodrome | Thurles | County Tipperary | 52°42′11″N 007°42′20″W | Abandoned |
| EINC | | Newcastle Aerodrome | Greystones | County Wicklow | 53°04′16″N 006°02′43″W | |
| EINN | SNN | Shannon Airport | Shannon | County Clare | 52°42′07″N 008°55′29″W | |
| EIPT | | Powerscourt Airfield | Dún Laoghaire-Rathdown | County Dublin | 53°10′42″N 006°11′47″W | Closed |
| EIRT | | Rathcoole Aerodrome | Rathcoole (Ráth Chúil) | County Cork (Contae Chorcaí) | 52°06′20″N 008°59′00″W | |
| EISG | SXL | Sligo Airport | Strandhill, near Sligo | County Sligo | 54°16′49″N 008°35′57″W | |
| EISP | | Spanish Point Airfield | West Clare | County Clare | 52°50′59″N 009°25′01″W | |
| EITM | | Trim Airfield | Trim | County Meath | 53°34′29″N 006°44′19″W | |
| EITT | | Trevet Aerodrome | Ashbourne | County Meath | 53°32′55″N 006°31′01″W | |
| EIWF | WAT | Waterford Airport | Waterford | | 52°11′14″N 007°05′13″W | |
| EIWT | WST | Weston Airport | Leixlip | County Kildare | 53°21′08″N 006°29′18″W | |

== EK – Denmark and the Faroe Islands ==
=== Denmark ===
Also see airport category and list.

| ICAO | IATA | Airport name | Community | Province or territory | Coordinates | Notes |
|---|---|---|---|---|---|---|
| EKAC | | Aarhus Harbour Seaplane Terminal | | | 56°09′09″N 010°15′04″E | |
| EKAE | | Ærø Airport | | | 54°51′13″N 010°27′21″E | |
| EKAH | AAR | Aarhus Airport | Tirstrup near Aarhus | | 56°18′15″N 010°37′09″E | |
| EKAT | | Anholt Airport | | | 56°41′54″N 011°33′21″E | |
| EKBI | BLL | Billund Airport | Billund | | 55°44′25″N 009°09′07″E | |
| EKCC | | Copenhagen Harbour (Nordhavn) Seaplane Terminal | | | 55°41′28″N 012°36′00″E | |
| EKCH | CPH | Copenhagen Airport | Kastrup near Copenhagen | | 55°37′05″N 012°39′22″E | |
| EKEB | EBJ | Esbjerg Airport | Esbjerg | | 55°31′33″N 008°33′12″E | |
| EKHG | | Herning Airport | Herning | | 56°11′05″N 009°02′40″E | |
| EKHI | | Hattarvik Heliport | | | 62°19′49″N 006°16′36″W | |
| EKHK | | Holbæk Airport | | | 55°44′02″N 011°36′18″E | |
| EKHS | | Hadsund Airport | | | 56°45′21″N 010°13′57″E | Closed |
| EKKA | KRP | Karup Airport | Karup | | 56°17′51″N 009°07′29″E | |
| EKKL | | Kalundborg Airfield | Kaldred near Kalundborg | | 55°42′00″N 011°14′58″E | |
| EKKS | | Kongsted Flyveplads | near Faxe | | 55°15′05″N 012°03′46″E | |
| EKKU | | Kirkja Heliport | | | 62°19′02″N 006°18′48″W | |
| EKLS | | Læsø Airport | | | 57°16′37″N 010°59′59″E | |
| EKLV | | Lemvig Airport | Lemvig | | 56°30′11″N 008°18′42″E | |
| EKMB | MRW | Lolland Airport | Maribo | | 54°41′58″N 011°26′23″E | |
| EKNM | | Morsø Airport | | | 56°49′29″N 008°47′09″E | |
| EKNB | | Pøl Flyveplads | Nordborg | | 55°04′29″N 09°45′12″E | |
| EKOD | ODE | Odense Airport | Odense | | 55°28′36″N 010°19′51″E | |
| EKPB | | Kruså-Padborg Airport | | | 54°52′13″N 009°16′44″E | |
| EKRD | | Randers Airport | Randers | | 56°30′18″N 010°01′57″E | |
| EKRK | RKE | Roskilde Airport | Tune near Roskilde | | 55°35′08″N 012°07′53″E | |
| EKRN | RNN | Bornholm Airport | Rønne | | 55°03′48″N 014°45′34″E | |
| EKRS | | Ringsted Airfield | Ringsted | | 55°25′33″N 011°48′24″E | |
| EKSB | SGD | Sønderborg Airport | Sønderborg | | 54°57′52″N 009°47′30″E | |
| EKSD | | Spjald Airport | | | 56°06′11″N 008°30′53″E | |
| EKSL | | Midtsjællands svæveflyveklub | Slaglille | | 55°27′10″N 011°38′36″E | |
| EKSN | CNL | Sindal Airport | Sindal | | 57°30′17″N 010°13′36″E | |
| EKSP | SKS | Skrydstrup Airport | Vojens | | 55°13′16″N 009°16′01″E | |
| EKSS | | Samsø Airport | | | 55°53′23″N 010°36′40″E | |
| EKST | | Tåsinge/Elvira Madigan Airport | | | 55°01′00″N 010°33′48″E | |
| EKSV | SQW | Skive Airport | Skive | | 56°33′01″N 009°10′23″E | |
| EKTD | | Tønder Airport | | | 54°55′47″N 008°50′26″E | |
| EKTS | TED | Thisted Airport | Thisted | | 57°04′08″N 008°42′19″E | |
| EKVB | | Viborg Airport | | | 56°24′36″N 009°24′33″E | |
| EKVD | | Vamdrup Airport | Kolding | | 55°26′11″N 009°19′51″E | |
| EKVH | | Vesthimmerland Airport | Aars | | 56°50′49″N 009°27′31″E | |
| EKVJ | STA | Stauning Vestjylland Airport | Skjern | | 55°59′24″N 008°21′17″E | |
| ~~EKVL~~ | | ~~Værløse Air Base~~ | Furesø | | 55°46′02″N 012°20′36″E | Closed 2004 |
| EKYT | AAL | Aalborg Airport | Aalborg | | 57°05′34″N 009°50′57″E | |

==== EK – Denmark hospital heliports ====
| ICAO | IATA | Airport name | Community | Province or territory | Coordinates | Notes |
|---|---|---|---|---|---|---|
| EKOH | | Odense University Hospital | Odense | | 55°23′04″N 010°21′50″E | |
| EKRB | | Bornholm Hospital | | | 55°28′36″N 010°19′51″E | |
| EKRH | | Rigshospitalet | Copenhagen | | 55°41′48″N 012°34′00″E | |
| EKSH | | Aarhus University Hospital - Heartcenter | Aarhus | | 56°11′27″N 010°10′30″E | formerly "Skejby Hospital" |
| EKTR | | Aarhus University Hospital - Traumacenter | Aarhus | | 56°11′35″N 010°10′03″E | |

=== Faroe Islands ===
Also see airport category and list.

| ICAO | IATA | Airport name | Community | Province or territory | Coordinates | Notes |
|---|---|---|---|---|---|---|
| EKFA | | Froðba Heliport | | Faroe Islands | 61°32′37″N 006°46′28″W | |
| EKKV | | Klaksvík Heliport | | Faroe Islands | 62°13′04″N 006°34′35″W | |
| EKMS | | Mykines Heliport | | Faroe Islands | 62°06′08″N 007°38′45″W | |
| EKSO | | Svínoy Heliport | | Faroe Islands | 62°16′36″N 006°20′29″W | |
| EKSR | | Stóra Dímun Heliport | | Faroe Islands | 61°41′07″N 006°45′31″W | |
| EKSY | | Skúvoy Heliport | | Faroe Islands | 61°46′10″N 006°48′13″W | |
| EKTB | | Tórshavn/Bodanes Heliport | | Faroe Islands | 62°01′18″N 006°45′27″W | |
| EKVG | FAE | Vágar Airport | | Faroe Islands | 62°03′49″N 007°16′38″W | |

== EL – Luxembourg ==
Also see airport category and list.

All airports in Luxembourg from Aeronautical Information Publication at Belgocontrol.

| ICAO | IATA | Airport name | Community | Province or territory | Coordinates | Notes |
|---|---|---|---|---|---|---|
| ELEA | | Centre Hospitalier Emile Mayrisch Heliport | Esch-sur-Alzette | | 49°30′03″N 005°58′06″E | |
| ELET | | Saint-Louis Hospital Heliport | Ettelbruck | | 49°51′16″N 006°05′40″E | |
| ELLC | | Centre Hospitalier de Luxembourg Heliport | Luxembourg City | | 49°37′09″N 006°06′09″E | |
| ELLK | | Kirchberg Hospital Heliport | Luxembourg City | | 49°37′58″N 006°10′38″E | |
| ELLX | LUX | Luxembourg Findel Airport | Luxembourg City | | 49°37′24″N 006°12′16″E | |
| ELLZ | | Clinique Sainte-Thérèse Heliport | Luxembourg City | | 49°36′12″N 006°07′41″E | |
| ELMD | | Kitzebur/Medernach Airfield | Vallée de l'Ernz | | 49°47′21″N 006°14′30″E | Abandoned |
| ELNT | | Noertrange Airfield (Wiltz-Noertrange Airfield) | Noertrange/Wiltz | | 49°58′52″N 005°55′04″E | |
| ELUS | | Useldange Airfield | Useldange | | 49°46′04″N 005°58′03″E | |

== EN – Norway ==
Also see airport category and list.
Note: majority of the entries show "airport name, village or town or city" – "municipality", "county"

| ICAO | IATA | Airport name | Community | County or territory | Coordinates | Notes |
|---|---|---|---|---|---|---|
| ENAE | | Landsørkje Airport | | | 61°15′30″N 011°40′12″E | |
| ENAH | | Ål Medical Centre Heliport | | | 60°37′48″N 008°34′01″E | |
| ENAL | AES | Ålesund Airport, Vigra | Ålesund | Møre og Romsdal | 62°33′45″N 006°07′11″E | |
| ENAN | ANX | Andøya Airport, Andenes | Andenes | Nordland | 69°17′33″N 016°08′39″E | |
| ENAR | | Arendal Hospital Heliport | | | 58°28′03″N 008°45′15″E | |
| ENAS | | Ny-Ålesund Airport, Hamnerabben | Ny-Ålesund | Svalbard | 78°55′40″N 011°52′29″E | |
| ENAT | ALF | Alta Airport | Alta | Finnmark | 69°58′34″N 023°22′18″E | |
| ENAX | | Ålesund Hospital Heliport | | | 62°27′47″N 006°18′45″E | |
| ENBA | | Barentsburg Heliport | | | 78°06′05″N 014°11′42″E | |
| ENBE | | Balder Helipad | | | 59°11′26″N 002°21′29″E | |
| ENBG | | Bergen Grønneviksøren Heliport | | | 60°22′48″N 005°20′46″E | |
| ENBH | | Haakonsvern Heliport | | | 60°19′59″N 005°13′40″E | |
| ENBJ | | Bear Island Heliport (Bjørnøya) | Arctic | | 74°30′15″N 019°00′09″E | |
| ENBL | FDE | Førde Airport, Bringeland | Førde | Vestland | 61°23′28″N 005°45′25″E | |
| ENBM | | Voss Airport, Bømoen | Voss | Vestland | 60°38′19″N 006°30′05″E | |
| ENBN | BNN | Brønnøysund Airport, Brønnøy | Brønnøysund | Nordland | 65°27′40″N 012°13′03″E | |
| ENBO | BOO | Bodø Airport | Bodø | Nordland | 67°16′09″N 014°21′55″E | |
| ENBR | BGO | Bergen Airport, Flesland | Bergen | Vestland | 60°17′37″N 005°13′05″E | |
| ENBS | BJF | Båtsfjord Airport | Båtsfjord | Finnmark | 70°36′01″N 029°41′34″E | |
| ENBV | BVG | Berlevåg Airport | Berlevåg | Finnmark | 70°52′17″N 029°02′03″E | |
| ENBX | | Haukeland Hospital Heliport | | | 60°22′23″N 005°21′30″E | |
| ENCN | KRS | Kristiansand Airport, Kjevik | Kristiansand | Agder | 58°12′14″N 008°05′06″E | |
| ENDB | | Dombås Heliport, Brunshaugen | | | 62°04′08″N 009°07′16″E | |
| ENDH | | Drammen Heliport | | | 59°44′52″N 010°11′51″E | |
| ENDI | | Geilo Airport, Dagali | Geilo | Buskerud | 60°25′00″N 008°30′46″E | |
| ENDO | | Dokka Airport, Tomlevold | | | 60°50′01″N 009°54′52″E | |
| ENDP | | Draupner Helipad | | | 58°11′17″N 002°28′16″E | |
| ENDR | | Draugen Helipad | Draugen oil field | Norwegian Sea | 64°21′20″N 007°47′30″E | |
| ENDU | BDU | Bardufoss Airport | Bardufoss | Troms | 69°03′21″N 018°32′25″E | |
| ENEG | | Hønefoss Airport, Eggemoen | Hønefoss | Buskerud | 60°12′52″N 010°19′07″E | |
| ENEK | | Ekofisk H Helipad | | | 56°32′50″N 003°12′47″E | |
| ENEL | | Elverum Innlandet Hospital Heliport | | | 60°52′36″N 011°34′11″E | |
| ENEN | | Engeløy Airport, Grådussan | Engeløy | Nordland | 67°58′02″N 014°59′33″E | |
| ENEV | EVE | Harstad/Narvik Airport, Evenes | Evenes | Nordland and Troms | 68°29′20″N 016°40′42″E | |
| ENFA | | Frøya Flatval Airport | | | 63°42′02″N 008°45′38″E | |
| ENFB | | Statfjord B Helipad | Statfjord oil field | North Sea | 61°12′23″N 001°49′44″E | |
| ENFD | | Førde Airport, Øyrane | | | 61°27′28″N 005°50′02″E | Closed |
| ENFG | VDB | Fagernes Airport, Leirin | Fagernes | Innlandet | 61°00′56″N 009°17′17″E | |
| ENFJ | | Fedje Heliport, Høgden | | | 60°45′57″N 004°43′59″E | |
| ENFL | FRO | Florø Airport | Florø | Vestland | 61°35′01″N 005°01′29″E | |
| ENFO | | Stavanger Forus Airport | | | 58°53′32″N 005°42′27″E | Closed |
| ENFR | | Frigg Helipad | | North Sea | 59°52′41″N 002°03′54″E | Closed |
| ENFY | | Vest-Telemark Airport, Fyresdal | | | 59°12′14″N 008°05′17″E | |
| ENFZ | | Larvik Friztøe Airport | | | 59°03′04″N 010°03′59″E | Closed |
| ENGA | | Gullfaks A Helipad | Gullfaks oil field | North Sea | 61°10′32″N 002°11′15″E | |
| ENGC | | Gullfaks C Helipad | Gullfaks oil field | North Sea | 61°12′51″N 002°16′16″E | |
| ENGK | | Arendal Executive/Gullknapp Airfield | Arendal | Agder | 58°31′00″N 008°42′00″E | |
| ENGM | OSL | Oslo Airport, Gardermoen | Gardermoen (near Oslo) | Akershus | 60°12′10″N 011°05′02″E | |
| ENGN | | Grimsmoen Airport, Folldal | | | 62°07′00″N 010°06′36″E | |
| ENGS | | Grønøra Airport, Snåsa | | | 64°10′59″N 012°10′13″E | |
| ENHA | HMR | Hamar Airport, Stafsberg | Hamar | Innlandet | 60°49′05″N 011°04′05″E | |
| ENHD | HAU | Haugesund Airport, Karmøy | Haugesund | Rogaland | 59°20′36″N 005°12′45″E | |
| ENHE | | Heidrun Helipad | Heidrun oil field | North Sea | 65°19′32″N 007°18′57″E | |
| ENHF | HFT | Hammerfest Airport | Hammerfest | Finnmark | 70°40′47″N 023°40′07″E | |
| ENHH | | Harstad Hospital Heliport | | | 68°47′44″N 016°31′31″E | |
| ENHK | HAA | Hasvik Airport | Hasvik | Finnmark | 70°29′12″N 022°08′23″E | |
| ENHM | | Heimdal Helipad | | | 59°34′00″N 000°14′00″E | |
| ENHO | | Hopen Heliport | | | 76°30′29″N 025°00′50″E | |
| ENHR | | Harstad Stangnes South Heliport | | | 68°46′47″N 016°35′44″E | |
| ENHS | | Hokksund Airport | Hokksund | Buskerud | 59°45′36″N 009°55′11″E | |
| ENHT | | Hattfjelldal Airport | | | 65°35′42″N 013°59′24″E | |
| ENHV | HVG | Honningsvåg Airport, Valan | Honningsvåg | Finnmark | 71°00′35″N 025°59′01″E | |
| ENHX | | Haugesund Hospital Heliport | | | 59°24′31″N 005°16′47″E | |
| ENIS | | Isfjord Heliport | | | 78°04′01″N 013°37′58″E | |
| ENJA | | Jan Mayensfield | Jan Mayen | | 70°57′40″N 008°34′33″W | |
| ENJB | | Tønsberg Airport, Jarlsberg | Tønsberg | Vestfold | 59°17′54″N 010°22′09″E | |
| ENKA | | Kautokeino Airport | | | 69°02′25″N 023°02′03″E | |
| ENKB | KSU | Kristiansund Airport, Kvernberget | Kristiansund | Møre og Romsdal | 63°06′43″N 007°49′34″E | |
| ENKH | | Kristiansand Hospital Heliport | | | 58°09′51″N 007°58′55″E | |
| ENKJ | | Kjeller Airport | Kjeller | Akershus | 59°58′10″N 011°02′20″E | |
| ENKL | GLL | Gol Airport, Klanten | Gol | Buskerud | 60°47′27″N 009°03′02″E | |
| ENKR | KKN | Kirkenes Airport, Høybuktmoen | Kirkenes | Finnmark | 69°43′30″N 029°53′16″E | |
| ENKS | | Kristiansund Hospital Heliport | | | 63°06′27″N 007°43′24″E | |
| ENLA | | Ula Helipad | | | 57°06′42″N 002°50′48″E | |
| ENLB | | Lesja Airport, Bjorli | | | 62°14′06″N 008°14′43″E | |
| ENLE | | Ekofisk L Helipad | | | 56°32′00″N 003°13′00″E | |
| ENLG | | Stryn Langeset Heliport | | | 61°53′56″N 006°37′08″E | |
| ENLH | | Lillehammer Innlandet Hospital Heliport | | | 61°06′48″N 010°28′20″E | |
| ENLI | FAN | Farsund Airport, Lista | Farsund | Agder | 58°06′01″N 006°37′30″E | |
| ENLK | LKN | Leknes Airport | Leknes | Nordland | 68°09′09″N 013°36′34″E | |
| ENLU | | Lunde Airport, Nome | | | 59°17′52″N 009°07′55″E | |
| ENLV | | Salangen Airport, Elvenes | | | 68°52′16″N 017°59′04″E | |
| ENLX | | Lørenskog Heliport, Ahus | | | 59°55′56″N 010°59′13″E | |
| ENMH | MEH | Mehamn Airport | Mehamn | Finnmark | 71°01′44″N 027°49′35″E | |
| ENML | MOL | Molde Airport, Årø | Molde | Møre og Romsdal | 62°44′41″N 007°15′45″E | |
| ENMP | | Molde Hospital Heliport | | | 62°44′14″N 007°08′08″E | |
| ENMS | MJF | Mosjøen Airport, Kjærstad | Mosjøen | Nordland | 65°47′02″N 013°12′54″E | |
| ENNA | LKL | Lakselv Airport, Banak | Lakselv | Finnmark | 70°04′00″N 024°58′26″E | |
| ENND | | Narvik Heliport, Djupvik | | | 68°27′05″N 017°31′56″E | |
| ENNE | | Norne A Helipad | | | 66°02′00″N 008°05′00″E | |
| ENNH | | Namsos Hospital Heliport | | | 64°28′12″N 011°30′15″E | |
| ~~ENNK~~ | ~~NVK~~ | ~~Narvik Airport, Framnes~~ | Narvik | Nordland | 68°26′09″N 017°23′17″E | Closed 2017 |
| ENNM | OSY | Namsos Airport | Namsos | Trøndelag | 64°28′20″N 011°34′43″E | |
| ENNO | NTB | Notodden Airport | Notodden | Telemark | 59°33′56″N 009°12′44″E | |
| ENOA | | Oseberg A Helipad | Oseberg oil field | North Sea | 60°29′29″N 002°49′32″E | |
| ENOC | | Oseberg C Helipad | Oseberg oil field | North Sea | 60°36′28″N 002°46′28″E | |
| ENOE | | Troll Airfield | Troll Research Station | Antarctica | 71°57′19″S 002°28′03″E | |
| ENOL | OLA | Ørland Main Air Station | Ørland | Trøndelag | 63°41′57″N 009°36′14″E | |
| ENOP | | Oppdal Airport, Fagerhaug | Oppdal | Trøndelag | 62°38′59″N 009°50′48″E | |
| ENOV | HOV | Ørsta–Volda Airport, Hovden | Ørsta and Volda | Møre og Romsdal | 62°10′43″N 006°04′33″E | |
| ENPY | | Pyramiden Heliport | | | 78°39′08″N 016°20′13″E | |
| ENQA | | Troll A Helipad | | | 60°38′42″N 003°43′29″E | |
| ENQB | | Troll B Helipad | | | 60°46′26″N 003°30′05″E | |
| ENQC | | Troll C Helipad | | | 60°53′09″N 003°36′35″E | |
| ENQD | | Brage A Helipad | | | 60°32′31″N 003°02′45″E | |
| ENQE | | Oseberg East Helipad | | | 60°42′00″N 002°56′01″E | |
| ENQF | | Veslefrikk A Helipad | | | 60°46′56″N 002°53′46″E | |
| ENQG | | Gullfaks B Helipad | | | 61°12′08″N 002°11′56″E | |
| ENQK | | Kvitebjørn Helipad | | | 61°05′00″N 002°30′00″E | |
| ENQO | | Oseberg South Helipad | | | 60°23′23″N 002°47′44″E | |
| ENQR | | Snorre B Helipad | | | 61°31′00″N 002°13′00″E | |
| ENQS | | Statfjord C Helipad | | | 61°17′46″N 001°54′03″E | |
| ENQV | | Visund A Helipad | | | 61°22′11″N 002°27′26″E | |
| ENQW | | Valemon Helipad | | | 61°02′24″N 002°22′01″E | |
| ENRA | MQN | Mo i Rana Airport, Røssvoll | Mo i Rana | Nordland | 66°21′50″N 014°18′06″E | |
| ENRE | | Rena Airport, Landsørkje | | | 61°11′10″N 011°22′29″E | |
| ENRG | | Rognan Airport | | | 67°05′52″N 015°24′40″E | |
| ENRH | | Oslo University Hospital Heliport | | | 59°56′54″N 010°42′58″E | |
| ENRI | | Ringebu Airport, Frya | Ringebu | Innlandet | 61°32′44″N 010°03′42″E | |
| ENRK | | Rakkestad Airport | Rakkestad | Østfold | 59°23′51″N 011°20′49″E | |
| ENRM | RVK | Rørvik Airport, Ryum | Rørvik | Trøndelag | 64°50′18″N 011°08′46″E | |
| ENRO | RRS | Røros Airport | Røros | Trøndelag | 62°34′42″N 011°20′32″E | |
| ENRS | RET | Røst Airport | Røst | Nordland | 67°31′40″N 012°06′12″E | |
| ENRT | | Trondheim Heliport, Rosten | | | 63°22′05″N 010°22′26″E | |
| ENRV | | Reinsvoll Airport | Reinsvoll | Innlandet | 60°40′22″N 010°34′00″E | |
| ENRX | | Hønefoss Ringerike Hospital Heliport | | | 60°08′57″N 010°15′19″E | |
| ENRY | RYG | Rygge Air Force Base | Rygge | Østfold | 59°22′44″N 010°47′08″E | |
| ENSA | | Svea Airport | Sveagruva | Svalbard | 77°53′49″N 016°43′30″E | Closed |
| ENSB | LYR | Svalbard Airport, Longyear | Longyearbyen | Svalbard | 78°14′46″N 015°27′56″E | |
| ENSC | | Suldal Airport, Sand | | | 59°29′01″N 006°16′20″E | |
| ENSD | SDN | Sandane Airport, Anda | Sandane | Vestland | 61°49′48″N 006°06′21″E | |
| ENSE | | Snorre A Helipad | | | 61°26′56″N 002°08′33″E | |
| ENSF | | Statfjord A Helipad | | | 61°15′19″N 001°51′08″E | |
| ENSG | SOG | Sogndal Airport, Haukåsen | Sogndal | Vestland | 61°09′26″N 007°08′17″E | |
| ENSH | SVJ | Svolvær Airport, Helle | Svolvær | Nordland | 68°14′36″N 014°40′09″E | |
| ENSI | | Ski Airport | | | 59°42′26″N 010°52′54″E | |
| ENSJ | | Sandnessjøen Hospital Heliport | | | 66°01′04″N 012°36′58″E | |
| ENSK | SKN | Stokmarknes Airport, Skagen | Stokmarknes | Nordland | 68°34′51″N 015°01′34″E | |
| ENSL | | Sleipner A Helipad | | | 58°22′00″N 001°54′25″E | |
| ENSM | | Elverum Airport, Starmoen | Elverum | Innlandet | 60°52′36″N 011°40′31″E | |
| ENSN | SKE | Skien Airport, Geiteryggen | Skien | Telemark | 59°11′06″N 009°34′01″E | |
| ENSO | SRP | Stord Airport, Sørstokken | Leirvik | Vestland | 59°47′34″N 005°20′23″E | |
| ENSR | SOJ | Sørkjosen Airport | Nordreisa | Troms | 69°47′12″N 020°57′35″E | |
| ENSS | VAW | Vardø Airport, Svartnes | Vardø | Finnmark | 70°21′19″N 031°02′42″E | |
| ENST | SSJ | Sandnessjøen Airport, Stokka | Sandnessjøen | Nordland | 65°57′24″N 012°28′08″E | |
| ENSU | | Sunndalsøra Airport, Vinnu | Sunndalsøra | Møre og Romsdal | 62°39′30″N 008°40′00″E | |
| ENSX | | Stavanger Hospital Heliport | | | 58°57′08″N 005°43′51″E | |
| ENTC | TOS | Tromsø Airport | Tromsø | Troms | 69°40′53″N 018°55′04″E | |
| ENTE | | Skien Hospital Heliport | | | 59°11′27″N 009°35′36″E | |
| ENTH | | Tønsberg Hospital Heliport | | | 59°16′24″N 010°24′59″E | |
| ENTO | TRF | Sandefjord Airport, Torp | Sandefjord | Vestfold | 59°11′12″N 010°15′31″E | |
| ENTR | | Trondheim St Olav’s Hospital Heliport | | | 63°25′12″N 010°23′08″E | |
| ENTS | | Trysil Airport, Sæteråsen | | | 61°13′55″N 012°15′58″E | |
| ENTU | | Tromsø University Hospital Heliport | | | 69°41′02″N 018°59′05″E | |
| ENTX | | Oslo helikopterplass, Taraldrud | Nordre Follo | Akershus | 59°48′14″N 010°50′26″E | |
| ENTY | | Tynset Airport | | | 62°15′24″N 010°40′06″E | |
| ENUA | | Åsgard A Helipad | | | 65°03′50″N 006°43′32″E | |
| ENUB | | Åsgard B Helipad | | | 65°06′36″N 000°47′22″E | |
| ENUC | | Åsgard C Helipad | | | 65°07′52″N 006°51′51″E | |
| ENUD | | Njord A Helipad | | | 64°16′14″N 007°12′00″E | |
| ENUE | | Njord B Helipad | | | 64°16′16″N 007°12′05″E | |
| ENUH | | Oslo Ullevål University Heliport | | | 59°56′10″N 010°44′11″E | |
| ENUK | | Kristin Helipad | | | 64°59′38″N 006°33′05″E | |
| ENUL | | Vaksinen Airport | Ulven | Vestland | 60°11′29″N 005°25′14″E | |
| ENUN | | Aasta Hansteen Helipad | | | 67°02′27″N 007°03′18″E | |
| ENUS | | Skarv Helipad | | | 65°41′59″N 007°39′03″E | |
| ENVA | TRD | Trondheim Airport, Værnes | Stjørdal | Trøndelag | 63°27′27″N 010°55′27″E | |
| ENVD | VDS | Vadsø Airport | Vadsø | Finnmark | 70°03′55″N 029°50′41″E | |
| ENVR | | Værøy Heliport | Værøy | Nordland | 67°39′16″N 012°43′37″E | |
| ENVS | | Verdal Heliport, Slottelid | | | 63°48′01″N 011°32′02″E | |
| ENWG | | Gudrun Helipad | | | 58°50′42″N 001°44′36″E | |
| ENWS | | Eldfisk S Helipad | | | 56°22′25″N 003°15′46″E | |
| ENWV | | Valhall PH Helipad | | | 56°17′00″N 003°24′00″E | |
| ENXA | | Ekofisk A Helipad | | | 56°31′13″N 003°13′17″E | |
| ENXB | | Eldfisk B Helipad | | | 56°25′07″N 003°13′01″E | |
| ENXH | | Hod B Helipad | | | 56°10′33″N 003°27′31″E | |
| ENXI | | Valhall Flank North Helipad | | | 56°19′26″N 003°21′04″E | |
| ENXJ | | Valhall Flank South Helipad | | | 56°13′37″N 003°26′09″E | |
| ENXK | | Ekofisk K Helipad | | | 56°33′55″N 003°12′17″E | |
| ENXL | | Eldfisk A Helipad | | | 56°22′34″N 003°15′52″E | |
| ENXM | | Embla Helipad | | | 56°19′57″N 003°14′49″E | |
| ENXO | | Ringhorne Helipad | | | 59°16′00″N 002°27′00″E | |
| ENXR | | Tambar Helipad | | | 56°59′00″N 002°57′30″E | |
| ENXW | | Grane Helipad | | | 59°09′54″N 002°29′12″E | |
| ENXZ | | Sleipner B Helipad | | | 58°25′00″N 001°43′00″E | |
| ENZV | SVG | Stavanger Airport, Sola | Stavanger | Rogaland | 58°52′36″N 005°38′16″E | |

== EP – Poland ==
Also see airport category and list.

| ICAO | IATA | Airport name | Community | Province or territory | Coordinates | Notes |
|---|---|---|---|---|---|---|
| EPAR | | Airfield and Heliport Arłamów | Arłamów | Subcarpathian | 49°39′30″N 022°30′51″E | |
| EPBA | | Bielsko-Biała Aleksandrowice Airport | Bielsko-Biała | Silesian | 49°48′18″N 019°00′07″E | |
| EPBC | | Warszawa-Babice Airfield | Warsaw | Masovian | 52°16′09″N 020°54′26″E | |
| EPBD | | Bydgoszcz-Biedaszkowo Airport | Bydgoszcz | Kuyavian–Pomeranian | 53°06′11″N 017°57′20″E | |
| EPBH | | Bydgoszcz Heliport | Bydgoszcz | Kuyavian–Pomeranian | 53°12′37″N 018°06′06″E | |
| EPBK | | Białystok-Krywlany Airport | Białystok | Podlachian | 53°06′08″N 023°10′14″E | |
| EPBO | | Borsk Airport | Borsk | Pomeranian | 53°57′04″N 017°56′53″E | |
| EPBP | | Biała Podlaska Air Base | Biała Podlaska | Lublin | 52°00′21″N 023°08′37″E | |
| EPBS | | Borne Sulinowo Airport | Borne Sulinowo | West Pomeranian | 53°34′30″N 016°31′27″E | |
| EPBY | BZG | Bydgoszcz Ignacy Jan Paderewski Airport | Bydgoszcz | Kuyavian–Pomeranian | 53°05′48″N 017°58′40″E | |
| EPCD | | Chelm-Depułtycze Airport | Depułtycze Królewskie | Lublin | 51°04′55″N 023°26′13″E | |
| EPCE | | Cewice Air Base | Cewice | Pomeranian | 54°25′00″N 017°45′57″E | |
| EPCH | | Hajnówka–Czyże Airfield | Czyże | Podlachian | 50°53′05″N 019°12′08″E | |
| EPDA | | Darłówek Airport | Darłowo | West Pomeranian | 54°24′13″N 016°21′17″E | |
| EPDE | | Dęblin Air Base | Dęblin | Lublin | 51°33′04″N 021°53′30″E | |
| EPDR | | Ziemsko Airport | Woliczno | West Pomeranian | 53°28′40″N 015°43′51″E | Closed |
| EPEL | | Elbląg Airfield | Elbląg | Warmian–Masurian | 54°08′27″N 019°25′24″E | |
| EPGD | GDN | Gdańsk Lech Wałęsa Airport | Gdańsk | Pomeranian | 54°22′39″N 018°27′58″E | |
| EPGE | | Giże Airport | Gmina Świętajno | Warmian–Masurian | 53°58′57″N 022°24′11″E | |
| EPGI | | Grudziądz-Lisie Kąty Airfield | Grudziądz | Kuyavian–Pomeranian | 53°31′28″N 018°50′58″E | |
| EPGL | | Gliwice-Trynek Airfield | Gliwice | Silesian | 50°16′10″N 018°40′22″E | |
| EPGO | | Góraszka Airport | Góraszka | Masovian | 52°11′04″N 021°16′52″E | Closed |
| EPGY | | Grądy Airport | Antoniewo | Masovian | 52°50′13″N 021°46′40″E | |
| EPHN | | Narew Airfield | Narew | Podlachian | 52°54′32″N 023°32′29″E | |
| EPIN | | Inowrocław Airfield | Inowrocław | Kuyavian–Pomeranian | 52°48′23″N 018°17′09″E | |
| EPIR | | Inowrocław-Latkowo Air Base | Inowrocław | Kuyavian–Pomeranian | 52°49′36″N 018°19′48″E | |
| EPIW | | Iwonicz Airfield | Pustyny | Subcarpathian | 49°39′29″N 021°49′03″E | |
| EPJA | | Jastarnia Airport | Jastarnia | Pomeranian | 54°42′37″N 018°38′43″E | |
| EPJG | | Jelenia Góra Airfield | Jelenia Góra | Lower Silesian | 50°53′54″N 015°47′08″E | |
| EPJS | | Jeżów Sudecki Airfield | Jeżów Sudecki | Lower Silesian | 50°55′42″N 015°45′35″E | |
| EPKA | | Kielce-Masłów Airfield | Kielce | Holy Cross | 50°53′49″N 020°43′53″E | |
| EPKB | | Konin-Kazimierz Biskupi Airport | Kazimierz Biskupi | Greater Poland | 52°19′09″N 018°10′04″E | |
| EPKC | | Kraków-Rakowice-Czyżyny Airport | Kraków | Lesser Poland | 50°05′04″N 019°59′25″E | |
| EPKE | | Kętrzyn-Wilamowo Airfield | Kętrzyn | Warmian–Masurian | 54°02′37″N 021°25′57″E | |
| EPKG | | Kołobrzeg-Bagicz Airport | Kołobrzeg | West Pomeranian | 54°12′00″N 015°41′01″E | |
| EPKH | | Koszalin Heliport | Świeszyno | West Pomeranian | 54°03′01″N 016°16′47″E | |
| EPKI | | Kikity Airport | Jeziorany | Warmian–Masurian | 53°58′58″N 020°52′38″E | |
| EPKK | KRK | John Paul II International Airport Kraków-Balice | Kraków | Lesser Poland | 50°04′40″N 019°47′05″E | |
| EPKM | | Katowice-Muchowiec Airport | Katowice | Silesian | 50°14′18″N 019°02′02″E | |
| EPKN | | Opole-Kamień Śląski Airport | Kamień Śląski | Opole | 50°31′45″N 018°05′05″E | |
| EPKO | | Korne Airport | Korne | Pomeranian | 54°07′47″N 017°50′43″E | |
| EPKP | | Kraków-Pobiednik Wielki Airfield | Kraków | Lesser Poland | 50°05′23″N 020°12′06″E | |
| EPKR | | Krosno Airport | Krosno | Subcarpathian | 49°40′52″N 021°44′16″E | |
| EPKS | | Poznań-Krzesiny Air Base | Poznań | Greater Poland | 52°19′53″N 016°58′06″E | |
| EPKT | KTW | International Airport Katowice in Pyrzowice | Katowice | Silesian | 50°28′27″N 019°04′48″E | |
| EPKW | | Bielsko-Biała Kaniów Airport | Kaniów | Silesian | 49°56′21″N 019°01′20″E | |
| EPKX | | Kraków Heliport | Kokotów | Lesser Poland | 50°01′22″N 020°04′13″E | |
| EPKZ | OSZ | Koszalin / Zegrze Pomorskie Airport | Zegrze Pomorskie | West Pomeranian | 54°02′32″N 016°15′51″E | |
| EPLB | LUZ | Lublin Airport | Lublin | Lublin Voivodeship | 51°14′25″N 022°42′49″E | |
| EPLE | | Legnica Airport | Legnica | Lower Silesian | 51°10′58″N 016°10′41″E | Closed |
| EPLI | | Linowiec Airport | Linowiec | Pomeranian | 54°00′29″N 018°29′59″E | |
| EPLK | | Łask Air Base | Łask | Łódź Voivodeship | 51°33′07″N 019°10′46″E | |
| EPLL | LCJ | Łódź Władysław Reymont Airport | Łódź | Łódź Voivodeship | 51°43′19″N 019°23′53″E | formerly Łódź-Lublinek Airport |
| EPLN | | Łańsk/Gryźliny Airport | Gryźliny | Warmian–Masurian | 53°36′29″N 020°20′40″E | |
| EPLR | QLU | Lublin-Radawiec Airport | Radawiec Duży | Lublin Voivodeship | 51°13′18″N 022°23′40″E | |
| EPLS | | Leszno Airport | Leszno | Greater Poland | 51°50′06″N 016°31′19″E | |
| EPLU | | Lubin-Obora Airport | Lubin | Lower Silesian | 51°25′23″N 016°11′45″E | |
| EPLY | | Łęczyca-Leźnica Wielka Air Base | Leźnica Wielka | Łódź Voivodeship | 52°00′17″N 019°08′44″E | |
| EPMB | | Malbork Air Base | Królewo Malborskie | Pomeranian | 54°01′36″N 019°08′11″E | |
| EPMI | | Mirosławiec Air Base | Mirosławiec | West Pomeranian | 53°23′41″N 016°04′59″E | |
| EPMJ | | Mikołajki Airport | Mikołajki | Warmian–Masurian | 53°48′28″N 021°33′21″E | |
| EPML | | Mielec Airport | Mielec | Subcarpathian | 50°19′21″N 021°27′44″E | |
| EPMM | | Mińsk Mazowiecki Air Base | Mińsk Mazowiecki | Masovian | 52°11′44″N 021°39′25″E | |
| EPMO | WMI | Modlin Airport | Nowy Dwór Mazowiecki | Masovian | 52°27′04″N 020°39′06″E | |
| EPMR | | Mirosławice Airport | Mirosławice | Lower Silesian | 50°57′30″N 016°46′12″E | |
| EPMX | | Milewo Airport | Milewo | Masovian | 52°39′55″N 020°25′42″E | |
| EPMY | | Myślibórz-Giżyn Airport | Nowogródek Pomorski | West Pomeranian | 52°56′28″N 015°01′47″E | |
| EPNA | | Nadarzyce Air Base | Jastrowie | Greater Poland | 53°27′18″N 016°29′22″E | |
| EPNC | | Chrcynno Airport | Chrcynno | Masovian | 52°34′27″N 020°52′18″E | |
| EPND | | Nowa Dęba Airport | Krzątka | Subcarpathian | 50°25′25″N 021°47′49″E | |
| EPNL | | Nowy Sącz-Łososina Dolna Airport | Nowy Sącz | Lesser Poland | 49°44′47″N 020°37′27″E | |
| EPNM | | Nowe Miasto nad Pilicą Airport | Nowe Miasto nad Pilicą | Masovian | 51°37′39″N 020°32′09″E | Closed |
| EPNT | QWS | Nowy Targ Airport | Nowy Targ | Lesser Poland | 49°27′45″N 020°03′01″E | |
| EPOD | QYO | Olsztyn-Dajtki Airport | Olsztyn | Warmian–Masurian | 53°46′21″N 020°24′54″E | |
| EPOK | QYD | Gdynia-Kosakowo Airport | Gdynia | Pomeranian | 54°34′44″N 018°31′09″E | |
| EPOM | | Ostrów Wielkopolski-Michałków Airport | Ostrów Wielkopolski | Greater Poland | 51°42′09″N 017°50′49″E | |
| EPOP | QPM | Opole-Polska Nowa Wieś Airport | Opole | Opole Voivodeship | 50°38′00″N 017°46′54″E | |
| EPPB | | Poznań-Bednary Airport | Bednary | Greater Poland | 52°32′05″N 017°13′02″E | |
| EPPC | | Pińczów Airport | Pińczów | Holy Cross | 50°31′04″N 020°30′58″E | |
| EPPG | | Kąkolewo Airport | Kąkolewo | Greater Poland | 52°14′06″N 016°14′35″E | |
| EPPI | | Piła Airfield | Piła | Greater Poland | 53°10′14″N 016°42′41″E | |
| EPPK | | Poznań-Kobylnica Airfield | Kobylica | Greater Poland | 52°26′02″N 017°02′38″E | |
| EPPL | QPL | Płock Airport | Płock | Masovian | 52°33′44″N 019°43′17″E | |
| EPPO | POZ | Poznań-Ławica Airport | Poznań | Greater Poland | 52°25′16″N 016°49′35″E | |
| EPPR | | Pruszcz Gdański Air Base | Pruszcz Gdański | Pomeranian | 54°14′54″N 018°40′13″E | |
| EPPT | | Piotrków Trybunalski Airport | Piotrków Trybunalski | Łódź Voivodeship | 51°22′59″N 019°41′18″E | |
| EPPW | | Powidz Air Base | Strzałkowo | Greater Poland | 52°22′45″N 017°51′04″E | |
| EPPZ | | Przasnysz Airport | Sierakowo | Masovian | 53°00′36″N 020°56′00″E | |
| EPRA | RDO | Warsaw Radom Airport | Radom | Masovian | 51°23′21″N 021°12′49″E | formerly Radom-Sadków Airport |
| EPRD | | Mazury Air Camp | Węgorzewo | Warmian-Masurian | 54°08′04″N 021°35′55″E | |
| EPRG | | Rybnik-Gotartowice Airfield | Rybnik | Silesian | 50°04′15″N 018°37′42″E | |
| EPRJ | | Rzeszów Airfield | Jasionka | Subcarpathian | 50°06′17″N 022°02′58″E | |
| EPRP | | Radom Piastów Airfield | Radom | Masovian | 51°28′53″N 021°06′37″E | |
| EPRU | | Częstochowa-Rudniki | Rędziny | Silesian | 50°53′05″N 019°12′07″E | |
| EPRZ | RZE | Rzeszów-Jasionka Airport | Rzeszów | Subcarpathian | 50°06′36″N 022°01′08″E | |
| EPSA | | Sanok Heliport | Sanok | Subcarpathian | 49°34′33″N 022°12′08″E | |
| EPSC | SZZ | Szczecin-Goleniów "Solidarność" Airport | Szczecin | West Pomeranian | 53°35′05″N 014°54′08″E | |
| EPSD | | Szczecin-Dąbie Airfield | Szczecin | West Pomeranian | 53°23′31″N 014°38′02″E | |
| EPSK | | Słupsk-Redzikowo Airport | Redzikowo | Pomeranian | 54°28′44″N 017°06′27″E | Closed |
| EPSL; EPSW | | Świdnik Airport | Świdnik | Lublin | 51°13′55″N 022°41′25″E | |
| EPSN | | Świdwin Air Base | Świdwin | West Pomeranian | 53°47′25″N 015°49′39″E | |
| EPSO | | Sochaczew-Bielice Airport | Kaźmierów | Masovian | 52°11′55″N 020°17′23″E | |
| EPSR | | Słupsk-Krępa Airfield | Słupsk | Pomeranian | 54°24′30″N 017°05′44″E | |
| EPSS | | Świdnica-Krzczonów Airport | Książnica | Lower Silesian | 50°49′02″N 016°34′55″E | |
| EPST | QXQ | Stalowa Wola-Turbia Airport | Turbia | Subcarpathian | 50°37′39″N 021°59′53″E | |
| EPSU | | Suwałki Airport | Suwałki | Podlachian | 54°04′22″N 022°53′57″E | |
| EPSY | SZY | Olsztyn-Mazury Regional Airport | Szczytno | Warmian–Masurian | 53°28′55″N 020°56′16″E | |
| EPTM | | Tomaszów Mazowiecki Air Base | Tomaszów Mazowiecki | Łódź Voivodeship | 51°35′04″N 020°05′52″E | |
| EPTO | | Toruń Airport | Toruń | Kuyavian–Pomeranian | 53°01′50″N 018°32′19″E | |
| EPWA | WAW | Warsaw Frederic Chopin Airport | Warsaw | Masovian | 52°09′57″N 020°58′02″E | formerly Okęcie International Airport |
| EPWK | | Włocławek-Kruszyn Airport | Kruszyn | Kuyavian–Pomeranian | 52°35′05″N 019°00′56″E | |
| EPWR | WRO | Wrocław Airport | Wrocław | Lower Silesian | 51°06′34″N 016°52′49″E | |
| EPWS | | Wrocław-Szymanów Airport | Szewce | Lower Silesian | 51°12′21″N 016°59′54″E | |
| EPWT | | Watorowo Airport | Kijewo Królewskie | Kujavian-Pomeranian | 53°17′55″N 018°24′51″E | |
| EPZA | | Zamość-Mokre Airport | Zamość | Lublin Voivodeship | 50°42′07″N 023°12′15″E | |
| EPZE | | Żerniki Airport | Żerniki | Greater Poland | 52°19′21″N 017°02′27″E | |
| EPZG | IEG | Zielona Góra-Babimost Airport | Zielona Góra | Lubusz | 52°08′19″N 015°47′55″E | |
| EPZN | | Żagań-Tomaszowo Airport | Tomaszowo | Lubusz | 51°37′39″N 015°24′30″E | Closed |
| EPZP | | Zielona Góra-Przylep Airfield | Zielona Góra | Lubusz | 51°58′44″N 015°27′50″E | |
| EPZR | | Żar Airfield | Międzybrodzie Żywieckie | Silesian | 49°46′16″N 019°13′04″E | |
| EPZW | | Zawiszyn Airport | Zawiszyn | Warmian-Masurian | 54°16′41″N 022°32′16″E | |

== ES – Sweden ==
Also see airport category and list.

| ICAO | IATA | Airport name | Community | Coordinates | Notes |
|---|---|---|---|---|---|
| ESCF | | Malmen Air Base | Linköping | 58°23′52″N 015°31′22″E | |
| ~~ESCK~~ | | Bråvalla Air Base | Norrköping | 58°36′39″N 016°06′13″E | Closed |
| ESCM | | Ärna Air Base (F 16) | Uppsala | 59°53′50″N 017°35′19″E | |
| ~~ESCN~~ | | Tullinge Airport | Stockholm | 59°10′45″N 017°54′28″E | Closed |
| ESDF | RNB | Ronneby Airport (F 17) | Ronneby | 56°16′00″N 015°15′54″E | |
| ESEG | | Gällivare/Vassara Heliport | | 67°08′12″N 020°38′01″E | |
| ESEK | | Lake Luossajärvi Heliport | | 67°51′36″N 000°12′26″E | |
| ESEL | | Linköping Hospital Heliport | | 58°24′06″N 015°37′10″E | |
| ESEM | | Lund Hospital Heliport | | 55°42′42″N 013°11′56″E | |
| ESES | | Sunderby Hospital Heliport | | 65°40′10″N 021°56′07″E | |
| ESEX | | Kriegers Flak A Heliport | | 55°01′28″N 012°51′03″E | |
| ESEY | | Lycksele Hospital Heliport | | 64°35′07″N 018°40′52″E | |
| ESEZ | | Kriegers Flak B Heliport | | 55°02′55″N 012°56′42″E | |
| ESFA | | Bokeberg Airport | Hässleholm | 56°08′04″N 013°52′32″E | |
| ~~ESFH~~ | | Hasslösa Air Base | Hasslösa | 58°24′34″N 013°15′47″E | Closed |
| ~~ESFI~~ | | Knislinge Air Base | Knislinge | 56°11′13″N 014°08′10″E | Closed |
| ESFJ | | Sjöbo Air Base | Sjöbo | 55°38′56″N 013°37′33″E | |
| ~~ESFM~~ | | Moholm Air Base | Moholm | 58°35′50″N 014°06′39″E | Closed |
| ~~ESFQ~~ | | Kosta Air Base | Kosta | 56°50′40″N 015°27′10″E | Closed |
| ESFR | | Råda Air Base | Råda | 58°29′53″N 013°03′12″E | |
| ESFS | | Sandvik Airport | Sandvik | 57°04′05″N 016°51′41″E | |
| ~~ESFU~~ | | Uråsa Air Base | Växjö | 56°40′53″N 014°56′48″E | Closed |
| ESFY | | Byholma Air Base | Byholma | 56°47′00″N 013°36′05″E | |
| ESGA | | Backamo Airport | Uddevalla | 58°10′38″N 011°58′25″E | |
| ESGB | | Torslanda Airport | | 57°42′39″N 011°46′52″E | Closed |
| ESGC | | Ålleberg Airport | Ålleberg | 58°08′04″N 013°36′09″E | |
| ESGD | | Bämmelshed Airport | Tidaholm | 58°11′30″N 013°59′45″E | |
| ESGE | | Viared Airport | Borås | 57°41′44″N 012°50′34″E | |
| ESGF | | Morup Airport | Falkenberg | 56°58′17″N 012°23′21″E | |
| ESGG | GOT | Göteborg Landvetter Airport | Gothenburg | 57°39′36″N 012°17′28″E | |
| ESGH | | Herrljunga Airport | Herrljunga | 58°01′45″N 013°06′30″E | |
| ESGI | | Alingsås Airport | Alingsås | 57°56′59″N 012°34′41″E | |
| ESGJ | JKG | Jönköping Airport | Jönköping | 57°45′30″N 014°04′18″E | |
| ESGK | | Falköping Airport | Falköping | 58°10′31″N 013°35′30″E | |
| ESGL | LDK | Lidköping-Hovby Airport | Lidköping | 58°27′55″N 013°10′27″E | |
| ESGM | | Öresten Airport | Öresten | 57°26′43″N 012°38′56″E | |
| ESGN | | Brännebrona Airport | Götene | 58°34′43″N 013°36′38″E | |
| ESGO | | Vårgårda Airport | | 58°02′22″N 012°47′20″E | |
| ESGP | GSE | Göteborg City Airport (Säve) | Gothenburg | 57°46′32″N 011°52′14″E | |
| ESGR | KVB | Skövde Airport | Skövde | 58°27′25″N 013°58′23″E | |
| ESGS | | Näsinge Airport | Strömstad | 59°01′00″N 011°20′37″E | |
| ESGT | THN | Trollhättan-Vänersborg Airport | Trollhättan / Vänersborg | 58°19′27″N 012°20′11″E | |
| ESGU | | Rörkärr Airport | Uddevalla | 58°22′03″N 011°46′31″E | |
| ESGV | | Varberg Airport | Varberg | 57°07′29″N 012°13′42″E | |
| ESGY | | Säffle Airport | Säffle | 59°05′28″N 012°57′31″E | |
| ESHB | | Sahlgrenska University East Hospital Heliport | | 57°43′15″N 012°02′52″E | |
| ESHC | | Södersjukhuset Hospital Heliport | | 59°18′31″N 018°03′17″E | |
| ESHD | | Danderyds Hospital Heliport | | 59°23′28″N 018°02′01″E | |
| ESHG | | Gamla Stan Heliport | | 59°19′22″N 018°04′00″E | |
| ESHH | | Hamnen Heliport | | 56°02′14″N 012°41′32″E | |
| ESHI | | Kristianstad Hospital Heliport | | 56°01′45″N 014°10′19″E | |
| ESHJ | | Ryhov Hospital Heliport | | 57°45′53″N 014°11′40″E | |
| ESHK | | Karolinska Hospital Heliport | | 59°21′04″N 018°02′07″E | |
| ESHL | | Huddinge Hospital Heliport | | 59°13′11″N 017°56′04″E | |
| ESHM | | Kungälvs Hospital Heliport | | 57°52′38″N 011°58′05″E | |
| ESHO | | Skövde Hospital Heliport | | 58°25′31″N 013°50′53″E | |
| ESHQ | | Örebro Hospital Heliport | | 59°16′29″N 015°13′44″E | |
| ESHS | | Sahlgrenska Hospital Heliport | | 57°41′01″N 011°57′24″E | |
| ESHT | | Gärdet Heliport | | 59°20′27″N 018°06′14″E | |
| ESHX | | Hudiksvall Hospital Heliport | | 61°43′50″N 017°06′00″E | |
| ESHY | | Norrtälje Hospital Heliport | | 59°45′28″N 018°41′21″E | |
| ESIA | | Karlsborg Air Base | Karlsborg | 58°30′50″N 014°30′26″E | |
| ESIB | | Såtenäs Air Base | Såtenäs | 58°26′10″N 012°43′12″E | |
| ESJB | | Bollnäs Hospital Heliport | | 61°21′10″N 016°21′40″E | |
| ESKA | | Gimo Air Base | Gimo | 60°07′47″N 018°05′50″E | |
| ~~ESKB~~ | | Barkarby Airport | Stockholm | 59°24′52″N 017°52′55″E | Closed |
| ESKC | | Sundbro Airport | Sundbro | 59°55′22″N 017°32′12″E | |
| ESKD | | Dala-Järna Airport | Dala-Järna | 60°33′22″N 014°22′38″E | |
| ESKG | | Gryttjom Airport | Gryttjom | 60°17′13″N 017°25′18″E | |
| ESKH | | Ekshärad Airport | Ekshärad | 60°09′17″N 013°31′43″E | |
| ESKK | KSK | Karlskoga Airport | Karlskoga | 59°20′40″N 014°29′41″E | |
| ESKM | MXX | Mora-Siljan Airport | Mora | 60°57′31″N 014°30′40″E | |
| ESKN | NYO | Stockholm-Skavsta Airport | Stockholm / Nyköping | 58°47′19″N 016°54′44″E | |
| ESKO | | Munkfors Airport | Munkfors | 59°47′56″N 013°29′27″E | |
| ESKS | SCR | Scandinavian Mountains Airport | Sälen | 61°09′32″N 012°50′24″E | ICAO code formerly used for Strangnas Air Base in/near Strangnas. |
| ESKT | | Tierp Airport | Tierp | 60°20′42″N 017°25′19″E | |
| ESKU | | Sunne Airport | Sunne | 59°51′37″N 013°06′46″E | |
| ESKV | | Arvika-Westlanda Airport | Arvika | 59°40′33″N 012°38′22″E | |
| ~~ESKX~~ | | Björkvik Air Base | Björkvik | 58°47′26″N 016°34′16″E | Closed |
| ESMA | | Emmaboda Airport | Emmaboda | 56°36′39″N 015°36′17″E | |
| ESMB | | Borglanda Airport | Borglanda | 56°51′47″N 016°39′22″E | |
| ESMC | | Ränneslätt Airport | Eksjö | 57°40′14″N 014°56′35″E | |
| ESMD | | Vankiva Airport | Hässleholm | 56°11′04″N 013°45′01″E | Closed |
| ESME | | Eslöv Airport | Eslöv | 55°50′54″N 013°19′42″E | |
| ESMF | | Fagerhult Airport | Fagerhult | 56°23′16″N 013°28′14″E | |
| ESMG | | Feringe Airport | Ljungby | 56°57′01″N 013°55′18″E | |
| ESMH | | Höganäs Airport | Höganäs | 56°11′05″N 012°34′34″E | |
| ESMI | | Sövdeborg Airport | Sövdeborg | 55°35′54″N 013°40′29″E | |
| ESMJ | | Kågeröd Airport | Kågeröd | 55°59′41″N 013°03′03″E | |
| ESMK | KID | Kristianstad Airport | Kristianstad | 55°54′43″N 014°05′00″E | |
| ESML | | Landskrona Airport | Landskrona | 55°56′46″N 012°52′12″E | |
| ESMN | | Lund Airport | Lund | 55°41′07″N 013°12′40″E | |
| ESMO | OSK | Oskarshamn Airport | Oskarshamn | 57°21′02″N 016°29′47″E | |
| ESMP | | Anderstorp Airport | Anderstorp | 57°15′51″N 013°35′58″E | |
| ESMQ | KLR | Kalmar Airport | Kalmar | 56°41′07″N 016°17′15″E | |
| ESMR | | Trelleborg Airport (Maglarp Airport) | Trelleborg | 55°22′59″N 013°01′51″E | |
| ESMS | MMX | Malmö Airport | Malmö | 55°31′48″N 013°22′17″E | |
| ESMT | HAD | Halmstad Airport | Halmstad | 56°41′27″N 012°49′12″E | |
| ESMU | | Möckeln Airport | Älmhult | 56°34′23″N 014°10′06″E | |
| ESMV | | Hagshult Air Base | Hagshult | 57°17′32″N 014°08′12″E | |
| ~~ESMW~~ | | Tingsryd Airport | Tingsryd | 56°31′59″N 014°57′50″E | Closed |
| ESMX | VXO | Växjö/Kronoberg Airport | Växjö | 56°55′44″N 014°43′40″E | |
| ESMY | | Smålandsstenar Airport | Smålandsstenar | 57°10′07″N 013°26′25″E | |
| ESMZ | | Ölanda Airport | Ölanda | 57°19′42″N 017°03′02″E | |
| ESNA | | Hallviken Airport | Hallviken | 63°44′18″N 015°27′30″E | |
| ESNB | | Sollefteå Airport | Sollefteå | 63°10′16″N 016°59′07″E | |
| ESNC | | Hedlanda Airport | Hede | 62°24′32″N 013°44′50″E | |
| ESND | EVG | Sveg Airport | Sveg | 62°02′52″N 014°25′22″E | |
| ESNE | | Överkalix Airport | Överkalix | 66°31′43″N 022°21′00″E | |
| ESNF | | Farila Air Base | Farila | 61°53′53″N 015°42′19″E | |
| ESNG | GEV | Gällivare Airport | Gällivare | 67°07′59″N 020°48′44″E | |
| ESNH | HUV | Hudiksvall Airport | Hudiksvall | 61°46′00″N 017°05′03″E | |
| ~~ESNI~~ | | Kubbe Air Base | Kubbe | 63°37′56″N 017°56′09″E | Closed |
| ESNJ | | Jokkmokk Air Base | Jokkmokk | 66°29′46″N 020°08′50″E | |
| ESNK | KRF | Höga Kusten Airport | Kramfors / Sollefteå | 63°02′55″N 017°46′08″E | |
| ESNL | LYC | Lycksele Airport | Lycksele | 64°32′53″N 018°42′58″E | |
| ESNM | | Optand Airport | Optand | 63°07′43″N 014°48′10″E | |
| ESNN | SDL | Sundsvall-Härnösand Airport | Sundsvall / Härnösand | 62°31′41″N 017°26′38″E | |
| ESNO | OER | Örnsköldsvik Airport | Örnsköldsvik | 63°24′30″N 018°59′24″E | |
| ESNP | | Piteå Airport | Piteå | 65°23′54″N 021°15′39″E | |
| ESNQ | KRN | Kiruna Airport | Kiruna | 67°49′20″N 020°20′12″E | |
| ESNR | | Orsa Airport | Orsa | 61°11′24″N 014°42′45″E | |
| ESNS | SFT | Skellefteå Airport | Skellefteå | 64°37′29″N 021°04′37″E | |
| ~~ESNT~~ | | Sattna Air Base | Sattna | 62°28′53″N 017°00′10″E | Closed |
| ESNU | UME | Umeå Airport | Umeå | 63°47′31″N 020°16′58″E | |
| ESNV | VHM | Vilhelmina Airport | Vilhelmina | 64°34′44″N 016°50′00″E | |
| ESNX | AJR | Arvidsjaur Airport | Arvidsjaur | 65°35′25″N 019°16′55″E | |
| ESNY | SOO | Söderhamn Airport | Söderhamn | 61°15′41″N 017°05′54″E | |
| ESNZ | OSD | Östersund Airport (F4 Frösön Air Base) | Östersund | 63°11′39″N 014°30′07″E | |
| ESOE | ORB | Örebro Airport | Örebro | 59°13′25″N 015°02′17″E | |
| ESOH | HFS | Hagfors Airport | Hagfors | 60°01′30″N 013°34′50″E | |
| ESOK | KSD | Karlstad Airport | Karlstad | 59°26′41″N 013°20′15″E | |
| ESOL | | Lemstanäs Airport | Storvik | 60°35′16″N 016°35′12″E | |
| ESOW | VST | Stockholm-Västerås Airport (Hässlö, former F1) | Stockholm / Västerås | 59°35′22″N 016°38′01″E | |
| ESPA | LLA | Luleå Airport (Kallax Air Base) | Luleå | 65°32′37″N 022°07′19″E | |
| ESPE | | Vidsel Air Base | Vidsel | 65°52′31″N 020°09′00″E | |
| ~~ESPG~~ | | Boden Army Air Base | Boden | 65°48′37″N 021°41′28″E | Closed |
| ~~ESPJ~~ | | Heden Air Base | Heden | 65°50′17″N 021°28′07″E | Closed |
| ESQO | | Arboga Airport | Arboga | 59°23′11″N 015°55′26″E | |
| ~~ESQP~~ | | Berga Airport | Berga | 59°04′12″N 018°07′01″E | Closed |
| ESSA | ARN | Stockholm-Arlanda Airport | Stockholm | 59°39′07″N 017°55′07″E | |
| ESSB | BMA | Stockholm-Bromma Airport | Stockholm | 59°21′16″N 017°56′23″E | |
| ESSC | | Ekeby Airport | Eskilstuna | 59°23′02″N 016°26′31″E | |
| ESSD | BLE | Dala Airport | Borlänge | 60°25′19″N 015°30′54″E | |
| ESSE | | Skå-Edeby Airport | Stockholm | 59°20′42″N 017°44′26″E | |
| ESSF | HLF | Hultsfred-Vimmerby Airport | Hultsfred / Vimmerby | 57°31′17″N 015°50′01″E | |
| ESSG | | Ludvika Airport | Ludvika | 60°05′18″N 015°05′47″E | |
| ESSH | | Laxå Airport | Laxå | 58°58′43″N 014°39′58″E | |
| ESSI | | Visingsö Airport | Visingsö | 58°05′54″N 014°24′09″E | |
| ESSK | GVX | Gävle-Sandviken Airport | Gävle / Sandviken | 60°35′40″N 016°57′04″E | |
| ESSL | LPI | Linköping-Saab Airport | Linköping | 58°24′30″N 015°40′22″E | |
| ESSM | | Brattforsheden Airport | Brattforsheden | 59°36′30″N 013°54′44″E | |
| ESSN | | Norrtälje Airport | Norrtälje | 59°44′01″N 018°41′54″E | |
| ESSP | NRK | Norrköping Airport | Norrköping | 58°35′10″N 016°13′54″E | |
| ESST | TYF | Torsby Airport (Fryklanda Airport) | Torsby | 60°09′17″N 012°59′40″E | |
| ESSU | EKT | Eskilstuna Airport | Eskilstuna | 59°21′00″N 016°42′30″E | |
| ESSV | VBY | Visby Airport | Visby | 57°39′46″N 018°20′46″E | |
| ESSW | VVK | Västervik Airport | Västervik | 57°46′47″N 016°31′26″E | |
| ESSX | | Johannisberg Airport | Västerås | 59°34′33″N 016°30′12″E | |
| ESSZ | | Vängsö Airport | Vängsö | 59°06′04″N 017°12′40″E | |
| ESTA | AGH | Ängelholm-Helsingborg Airport | Ängelholm / Helsingborg | 56°17′46″N 012°50′50″E | |
| ESTF | | Fjallbacka Airport | Fjällbacka | 58°37′48″N 011°18′52″E | |
| ESTG | | Grönhögen Airport | Grönhögen | 56°16′30″N 016°25′12″E | |
| ESTL | | Ljungbyhed Airport | Ljungbyhed | 56°04′58″N 013°12′45″E | |
| ~~ESTO~~ | | Tomelilla Airfield | Tomelilla | 55°32′35″N 014°00′03″E | Closed circa 2013 |
| ESTT | | Vellinge Airport | Vellinge | 55°23′40″N 013°01′30″E | |
| ~~ESUA~~ | | Åmsele Air Base | Åmsele | 64°34′14″N 019°18′50″E | Closed |
| ESUB | | Arbrå Airport | Arbrå | 61°30′45″N 016°22′21″E | |
| ESUD | SQO | Storuman Airport | Storuman | 64°57′39″N 017°41′47″E | |
| ESUE | IDB | Idre Airport | Idre | 61°52′11″N 012°41′21″E | |
| ~~ESUF~~ | | Fallfors Air Base | Fallfors | 65°06′27″N 020°45′39″E | Closed |
| ESUG | | Gargnäs Airport | Gargnäs | 65°18′19″N 017°58′32″E | |
| ESUH | | Myran Airport | Härnösand | 62°37′57″N 017°58′54″E | |
| ESUI | | Mellansel Airport | Mellansel | 63°23′54″N 018°19′42″E | |
| ESUJ | | Tälje Airport | Ånge | 62°33′55″N 015°50′05″E | |
| ESUK | | Kalixfors Army Air Base | Kalixfors | 67°45′53″N 020°15′26″E | |
| ESUL | | Ljusdal Airport | Ljusdal | 61°49′01″N 016°00′15″E | |
| ESUM | | Mohed Airport | Mohed | 61°17′28″N 016°50′47″E | |
| ESUO | | Oviken Airport | Oviken | 63°02′30″N 014°00′05″E | |
| ESUP | PJA | Pajala Airport | Pajala | 67°14′44″N 023°04′08″E | |
| ESUR | | Ramsele Airport | Ramsele | 63°29′25″N 016°29′00″E | |
| ESUS | | Åsele Airport | Åsele | 64°09′33″N 017°16′27″E | |
| ESUT | HMV | Hemavan Airport | Hemavan | 65°48′22″N 015°04′58″E | |
| ESUV | | Älvsbyn Airport | Älvsbyn | 65°38′45″N 021°03′40″E | |
| ESUY | | Edsbyn Airport | Edsbyn | 61°23′13″N 015°50′00″E | |
| ESVA | | Avesta Airport | Avesta | 60°10′49″N 016°07′22″E | |
| ESVB | | Bunge Airport | Bunge | 57°51′00″N 019°02′03″E | |
| ESVF | | Frölunda Airport | Frölunda | 59°27′25″N 017°42′28″E | |
| ESVG | | Gagnef Airport | Gagnef | 60°33′06″N 015°04′54″E | |
| ESVH | | Hällefors Airport | Hällefors | 59°52′03″N 014°25′26″E | |
| ESVK | | Katrineholm Airport | Katrineholm | 59°01′20″N 016°13′13″E | |
| ESVL | | Långtora flygfält | Enköping | 59°44′51″N 017°08′43″E | |
| ESVM | | Skinnlanda Airport | Malung | 60°39′32″N 013°43′36″E | |
| ESVQ | | Köping Airport | Köping | 59°31′39″N 015°58′11″E | |
| ESVS | | Siljansnäs Airport | Siljansnäs | 60°47′06″N 014°49′38″E | |

== ET – Germany (Military) ==
See ED/ET – Germany # ET – Military airports.

== EV – Latvia ==
Also see airport category and list.

| ICAO | IATA | Airport name | Community | Coordinates | Notes |
|---|---|---|---|---|---|
| EVAA | | Aizpute Airfield | Aizpute | 56°41′49″N 021°37′45″E | Closed |
| EVAD | | Adaži Airfield | Ādaži | 57°05′54″N 024°15′58″E | |
| EVAP | | AMO Plant Heliport | Jelgava | 56°39′58″N 023°46′47″E | |
| EVBA | | Grīva Airfield | Daugavpils | 55°53′02″N 026°28′16″E | |
| EVCA | | Vidzemes Airfield | Cēsis | 57°19′42″N 025°19′15″E | |
| EVDA | DGP | Daugavpils International Airport | Daugavpils | 55°56′33″N 026°40′06″E | |
| EVEA | | Jelgava Air Base | Jelgava | 56°40′22″N 023°40′45″E | |
| EVFA | | Vaiņode Air Base | Vaiņode | 56°24′20″N 021°53′13″E | |
| EVGA | | Lielvārde Air Base | Lielvārde | 56°46′42″N 024°51′14″E | |
| EVHB | | Baltijas Helikopters heliport | Nākotne | 56°36′29″N 023°27′30″E | |
| EVHN | | Nākotne Heliport | Nākotne | 56°36′28″N 023°27′30″E | |
| EVIA | | Cīrava Airfield | Cīrava | 56°44′17″N 021°21′35″E | |
| EVJA | | Jūrmala Airport | Tukums | 56°56′32″N 023°13′26″E | |
| EVJC | | Centra Jaunzemji Heliport | Nākotne | 56°36′23″N 023°27′08″E | |
| EVKA | | Jēkabpils Air Base | Jēkabpils | 56°32′05″N 025°53′33″E | |
| EVLA | LPX | Liepāja International Airport | Liepāja | 56°31′03″N 021°05′49″E | |
| EVLI | | Limbaži Airfield | Limbaži | 57°29′08″N 024°40′21″E | |
| EVLU | | Ludza Heliport | Ludza | 56°31′16″N 027°41′39″E | |
| EVMA | | Augstkalne Airfield | Augstkalne | 56°24′47″N 023°19′10″E | Closed |
| EVMP | | Mālpils Airfield | Mālpils | 57°02′44″N 024°56′45″E | Closed |
| EVNA | | Rēzekne Airfield | Rēzekne | 56°33′29″N 027°13′10″E | |
| EVOC | | Riga Old City Heliport | Riga | 56°57′24″N 024°05′45″E | |
| EVPA | | Ikšķile Airfield | Ikšķile | 56°48′56″N 024°31′28″E | |
| EVRA | RIX | Riga International Airport | Riga | 56°55′25″N 023°58′16″E | |
| EVRC | | Rumbula Air Base | Riga | 56°53′00″N 024°13′36″E | |
| EVRS | | Spilve Airport | Riga | 56°59′28″N 024°04′30″E | |
| EVSM | | M-Sola Heliport | Lielvārde | 56°39′56″N 024°54′11″E | |
| EVTE | | Talsi Airfield | Talsi | 57°15′16″N 022°33′58″E | |
| EVVA | VNT | Ventspils International Airport | Ventspils | 57°21′28″N 021°32′39″E | |

== EY – Lithuania ==
Also see airport category and list.

| ICAO | IATA | Airport name | Community | Coordinates | Notes |
|---|---|---|---|---|---|
| EYAL | | Alytus Airport | Alytus | 54°24′47″N 024°03′25″E | |
| EYBI | | Biržai Airport | Biržai | 56°10′29″N 024°45′53″E | |
| EYDR | | Druskininkai Airport | Druskininkai | 54°00′59″N 023°56′37″E | |
| EYJB | | Jurbarkas Airport | Jurbarkas | 55°07′05″N 022°45′54″E | |
| EYKA | KUN | Kaunas International Airport | Kaunas | 54°57′50″N 024°05′05″E | |
| EYKD | | Kėdainiai Airport | Kėdainiai | 55°18′42″N 023°57′12″E | |
| EYKG | | Kaunas/Gamykla Airport | Kaunas | 54°52′46″N 023°54′18″E | |
| EYKL | | Klaipėda Airfield | Klaipėda | 55°42′43″N 021°14′34″E | |
| EYKR | | Kazlų Rūda Airport | Kazlų Rūda | 54°48′20″N 023°31′59″E | Military |
| EYKS | | S. Darius and S. Girėnas Airport | Kaunas | 54°52′49″N 023°52′55″E | |
| EYKT | | Kartena Airport | Kartena | 55°55′13″N 021°34′02″E | |
| EYMA | | Tirkšliai Airport | Tirkšliai | 56°13′43″N 022°15′17″E | |
| EYMM | | Sasnava Airport | Sasnava | 54°39′44″N 023°27′08″E | |
| EYMO | | Molėtai Airport | Molėtai | 55°06′47″N 025°20′12″E | |
| EYNA | | Akmenė Airport | Akmenė | 56°14′34″N 022°43′58″E | |
| EYNE | | Nemirseta Airport | Nemirseta | 55°51′42″N 021°04′44″E | |
| EYNI | | Nida Airport | Nida | 55°19′40″N 021°02′44″E | Formerly EYND |
| EYPA | PLQ | Palanga International Airport | Palanga | 55°58′24″N 021°05′38″E | |
| EYPI | | Panevėžys/Istra Airport | Panevėžys | 55°49′39″N 024°21′23″E | |
| EYPK | | Pikeliškės Airport | Pikeliškės | 54°52′40″N 025°14′31″E | |
| EYPN | | Panevėžys Airfield | Panevėžys | 55°42′32″N 024°20′43″E | |
| EYPP | PNV | Pajuostis Airport | Pajuostis | 55°43′48″N 024°27′36″E | Military |
| EYPR | | Pociūnai Airport | Pociūnai | 54°39′13″N 024°03′26″E | |
| EYRD | | Rūdiškės Airport | Rūdiškės | 54°29′49″N 023°43′06″E | |
| EYRK | | Rokiškis Airport | Rokiškis | 55°58′19″N 025°36′15″E | |
| EYRO | | Rojūnai Airport | Rojūnai | 55°36′40″N 024°13′03″E | |
| EYRU | | Rukla Airport | Jonava | 55°00′36″N 024°21′48″E | |
| EYSA | SQQ | Šiauliai International Airport | Šiauliai | 55°53′38″N 023°23′42″E | Civil/Military |
| EYSB | | Barysiai Airport | Barysiai | 56°04′17″N 023°33′11″E | Civil/Military |
| EYSE | | Šeduva Airport | Šeduva | 55°44′42″N 023°48′31″E | |
| EYSI | | Šilutė Airport | Šilutė | 55°20′13″N 021°31′50″E | Military |
| EYTL | | Telšiai Airport | Telšiai | 55°59′15″N 022°17′33″E | |
| EYTR | | Tauragė Airport | Tauragė | 55°13′54″N 022°09′01″E | |
| EYUT | | Utena Airport | Utena | 55°29′21″N 025°43′06″E | |
| EYVI | VNO | Vilnius International Airport | Vilnius | 54°38′13″N 025°17′16″E | |
| EYVK | | Kyviškės Airport | Kyviškės | 54°40′05″N 025°30′56″E | Military |
| EYVP | | Paluknys Airport | Paluknys | 54°28′59″N 024°59′23″E | |
| EYZA | | Zarasai Airport | Zarasai | 55°45′09″N 026°15′25″E | |
