= List of airports in Denmark =

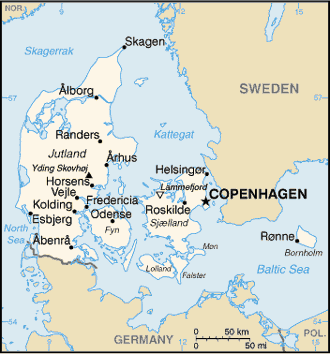
Map of Denmark

This is a list of airports in Denmark, sorted by location.

Denmark (Danish: Danmark) is a Scandinavian country in Northern Europe and the senior member of the Kingdom of Denmark. It is the southernmost of the Nordic countries, southwest of Sweden and south of Norway, and bordered to the south by Germany. Denmark borders both the Baltic and the North Sea.

The country consists of the large peninsula of Jutland (Jylland), as well as several hundred islands, most notably Zealand (Sjælland), Funen (Fyn), Vendsyssel-Thy, Lolland, Falster, Bornholm, and Amager. The capital and largest city of Denmark is Copenhagen (København), located on Amager and the east coast of Zealand.

== Airports ==
Airport names shown in bold have scheduled passenger service on commercial airlines.

City served/location	Region	ICAO	IATA	Airport name	Passengers (2023)	Runways
**Public aerodromes** (AIP VFR)
Aalborg / Nørresundby	North Jutland (Nordjylland)	EKYT	AAL	**Aalborg Airport** / Air Transport Wing Aalborg	1,410,575	08L/26R, 08R/26L
Aarhus (Århus) / Kolind	Mid-Jutland (Midtjylland)	EKAH	AAR	**Aarhus Airport**	543,479	10R/28L, 10L/28R
Aarhus / City	Mid-Jutland (Midtjylland)	EKAC		**Aarhus City Airport (harbor)** (see Nordic Seaplanes)	6,753	Water runway
Aars	North Jutland (Nordjylland)	EKVH		Aars Airport (Vesthimmerland Airport)		11/29
Ærø / Marstal	South Denmark (Syddanmark)	EKAE		**Ærø Airport**	74	
Anholt	Mid-Jutland (Midtjylland)	EKAT		Anholt Airport		
Billund	South Denmark (Syddanmark)	EKBI	BLL	**Billund Airport**	3,995,814	09/27
Bornholm / Rønne	Capital (Hovedstaden)	EKRN	RNN	**Bornholm Airport**	201,949	11/29
Copenhagen / Kastrup	Capital (Hovedstaden)	EKCH	CPH	**Copenhagen Airport, Kastrup**	26,697,123	04L/22R, 04R/22L, 12/30
Copenhagen / City	Capital (Hovedstaden)	EKCC		**Copenhagen Sea Airport (harbor)** (see also Nordic Seaplanes)	12,040	Water runway
Copenhagen / Roskilde	Zealand (Sjælland)	EKRK	RKE	**Copenhagen Airport, Roskilde**	24,152	11/29, 03/21
Esbjerg	South Denmark (Syddanmark)	EKEB	EBJ	**Esbjerg Airport**	96,713	08/26
Hadsund	North Jutland (Nordjylland)	EKHS		Hadsund Airport		(CLOSED)
Holbæk (Hagested)	Zealand (Sjælland)	EKHK		Holbæk Flyveplads		
Herning	Mid-Jutland (Midtjylland)	EKHG		Herning Airport	0	09/27
Kalundborg	Zealand (Sjælland)	EKKL		Kalundborg Airport		09/27
Karup / Herning	Mid-Jutland (Midtjylland)	EKKA	KRP	Karup Airport / Helicopter Wing Karup	13,038	09R/27L, 09L/27R, 03/21, 14/32
Kolding / Vamdrup	South Denmark (Syddanmark)	EKVD		Kolding Airport (Vamdrup Airport)	1,362	01/19
Kruså / Padborg	South Denmark (Syddanmark)	EKPB		Kruså-Padborg Airport		04/22
Læsø (Laesoe)	North Jutland (Nordjylland)	EKLS	BYR	**Læsø Airport**		06/24
Lemvig	Mid-Jutland (Midtjylland)	EKLV		Lemvig Airport		
Lolland Falster / Maribo	Zealand (Sjælland)	EKMB	MRW	Lolland Falster Airport (Maribo Airport)	0	09/27
Morsø (Mors) / Tødsø	North Jutland (Nordjylland)	EKNM		Morsø Airport, Tødsø		
Odense	South Denmark (Syddanmark)	EKOD	ODE	Hans Christian Andersen Airport	8,516	06/24
Randers	Mid-Jutland (Midtjylland)	EKRD		Randers Airport	0	07/25
Ringsted	Zealand (Sjælland)	EKRS		Ringsted Airport		
Samsø	Mid-Jutland (Midtjylland)	EKSS		Samsø Airport		
Sindal	North Jutland (Nordjylland)	EKSN	CNL	Sindal Airport	0	08/26
Skjern / Ringkøbing	Mid-Jutland (Midtjylland)	EKVJ	STA	Stauning Vestjylland Airport		09/27
Skive	Mid-Jutland (Midtjylland)	EKSV	SQW	Skive Airport		14/32
Sønderborg	South Denmark (Syddanmark)	EKSB	SGD	**Sønderborg Airport**	49,357	14/32
Spjald	Mid-Jutland (Midtjylland)	EKSD		Spjald Airport		
Svendborg / Tåsinge	South Denmark (Syddanmark)	EKST		Sydfyns Airport, Tåsinge	111	
Thisted / Hanstholm	North Jutland (Nordjylland)	EKTS	TED	Thisted Airport	932	10/28
Tønder	South Denmark (Syddanmark)	EKTD		Tønder Airport	0	12/18
Viborg	Mid-Jutland (Midtjylland)	EKVB		Viborg Airport	0	
Vojens	South Denmark (Syddanmark)	EKSP	SKS	Vojens Airport / Fighter Wing Skrydstrup		10L/28R, 10R/28L
**Military air bases**
Aalborg / Nørresundby	North Jutland (Nordjylland)	EKYT	AAL	Aalborg Air Base / Air Transport Wing Aalborg	1,410,575	08L/26R, 08R/26L
Karup / Herning	Mid-Jutland (Midtjylland)	EKKA	KRP	Karup Air Base / Helicopter Wing Karup	13,038	09R/27L, 09L/27R, 03/21, 14/32
Vojens	South Denmark (Syddanmark)	EKSP	SKS	Vojens Air Base / Fighter Wing Skrydstrup	244	10L/28R, 10R/28L

== See also ==
- List of airports in the Faroe Islands
- List of airports in Greenland
- List of the largest airports in the Nordic countries
- Royal Danish Air Force
- Transport in Denmark
- List of airports by ICAO code: EK – Denmark and the Faroe Islands
- Wikipedia: Airline destination lists: Europe#Denmark
