= Numansdorp Airfield =

- IATA: none; ICAO: EHND

Summary
- Airport type: Private
- Owner: J.A.P. Bogaerds
- Location: Numansdorp, South Holland
- Time zone: CET (+1)
- Elevation AMSL: 3 ft (0.91 m)
- Coordinates: 51°45′11″N 04°27′19″E

Map
- Location of Numansdorp Airfield

Runways
Direction	Length		Surface
Direction	m	ft	Surface
01/19	730	2,395	Grass

Airfield Numansdorp (Dutch: vliegveld Numansdorp) is a private owned airfield just south of the hamlet Middelsluis in Numansdorp, South Holland. The airfield is used once a year by Rotterdam Football club Feyenoord to fly their new players to their stadium, nicknamed De Kuip, during their season opening event. It is also home to a paragliding-club and occasionally used for events, like agricultural shows.

== History ==
Airport Numansdorp was a private airfield on the northern edge of the village of Numansdorp, south of Rotterdam, Netherlands. It started as just an airstrip which had its first flight in 1967. It was intended solely for the use of cropdusters. Multiple air fetes were organised in the 1990s, when Mr. Jan Bogaerds, the owner of the airport would invite cropdusters to show off their agility.

As late as 2011, the province of South Holland officially declared the terrain an airfield, allowing around 120+ starts a year. That same year a Dutch TV show used the airfield for a flight in a helicopter.

== See also ==
- List of airports by ICAO code: EH-EY#EH - Netherlands
- Transport in the Netherlands
