= Arboga Airfield =

- IATA: none; ICAO: ESQO

Summary
- Airport type: Public
- Serves: Arboga, Sweden
- Elevation AMSL: 33 ft / 10 m
- Coordinates: 59°23′11″N 015°55′26″E
- Interactive map of Arboga Airfield

Runways
Direction	Length		Surface
Direction	m	ft	Surface
15/33	2,000	6,562	Asphalt

Arboga Airfield (ICAO: ESQO) serves the city of Arboga in Västmanland County, Sweden. It is a former Swedish Airforce backup base located outside of Arboga used by the Test Unit of SWAF for tests of airborne missiles. Today, the airfield is solely used by the local flying club.

== Facilities ==
The field resides at an elevation of 33 feet (10 m) above mean sea level. It has a 2,000-by-40-metre (6,562 ft × 131 ft) asphalt paved runway (15/33) with a parallel taxiway. Currently, only 700 metres (2,300 ft) is used, because of a road over the runways southern end where former Air Force revetments can be seen.
