= Milewo =

Milewo may refer to the following places:

- Milewo, Kuyavian-Pomeranian Voivodeship (north-central Poland)
- Milewo, Grajewo County in Podlaskie Voivodeship (north-east Poland)
- Milewo, Łomża County in Podlaskie Voivodeship (north-east Poland)
- Milewo, Mońki County in Podlaskie Voivodeship (north-east Poland)
- Milewo, Siemiatycze County in Podlaskie Voivodeship (east Poland)
- Milewo, Płońsk County in Masovian Voivodeship (north-central Poland)
- Milewo, Sierpc County in Masovian Voivodeship (north-central Poland)
- Milewo, Warmian-Masurian Voivodeship (north-east Poland)
