= Rędziny =

Rędziny may refer to the following places in Poland:

- Rędziny, Lower Silesian Voivodeship (south-west Poland)
- Rędziny, Łódź Voivodeship (central Poland)
- Rędziny, Częstochowa County in Silesian Voivodeship (south Poland)
- Rędziny, Zawiercie County in Silesian Voivodeship (south Poland)
