= Lund Airport =

Lund Airport Hasslanda Flygfält
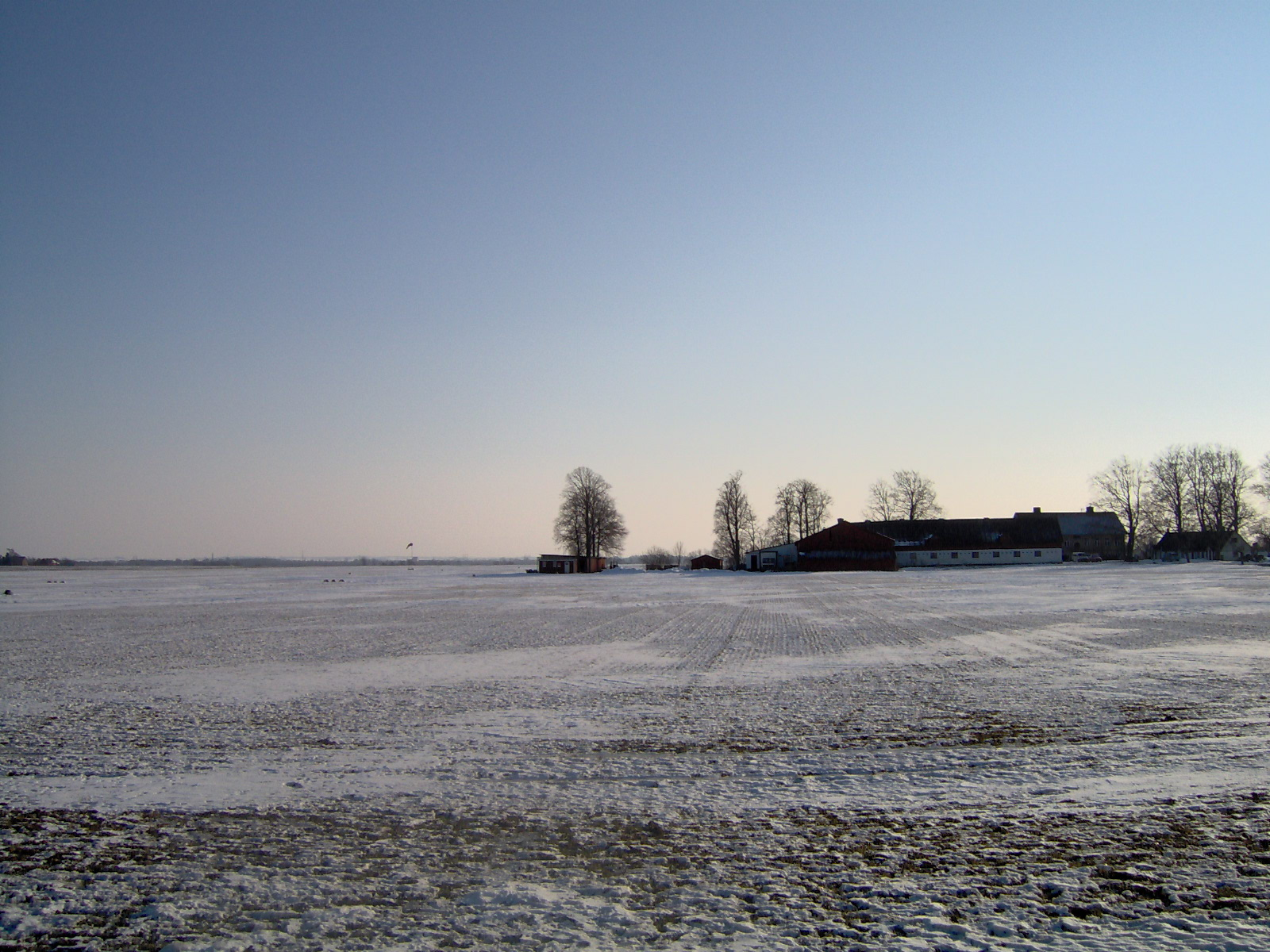
- IATA: none; ICAO: ESMN

Summary
- Airport type: Public
- Operator: Luftfartsverket
- Location: Lund, Sweden
- Elevation AMSL: 80 ft / 24 m
- Coordinates: 55°41′7″N 13°12′40″E
- Interactive map of Lund Airport

Runways
Direction	Length		Surface
Direction	ft	m	Surface
03/21	2,067	630	Grass
- Airport is permanently closed/removed.

Lund Airport (Swedish: Hasslanda Flygfält) (ICAO: ESMN) was an airfield located 2.5 kilometres (1.6 mi) south of Lund, Sweden. It was established in 1964 for private aircraft only. The airport also served as the helicopter landing area for Lund University Hospital. Before it was closed, in the 2000s, it mainly served as the home of the local flying club and other enthusiasts. The airfield closed in 2008 when the property was converted for industrial development.
