= Midden-Zeeland Airport =

Midden-Zeeland Airport Zeeland Airport
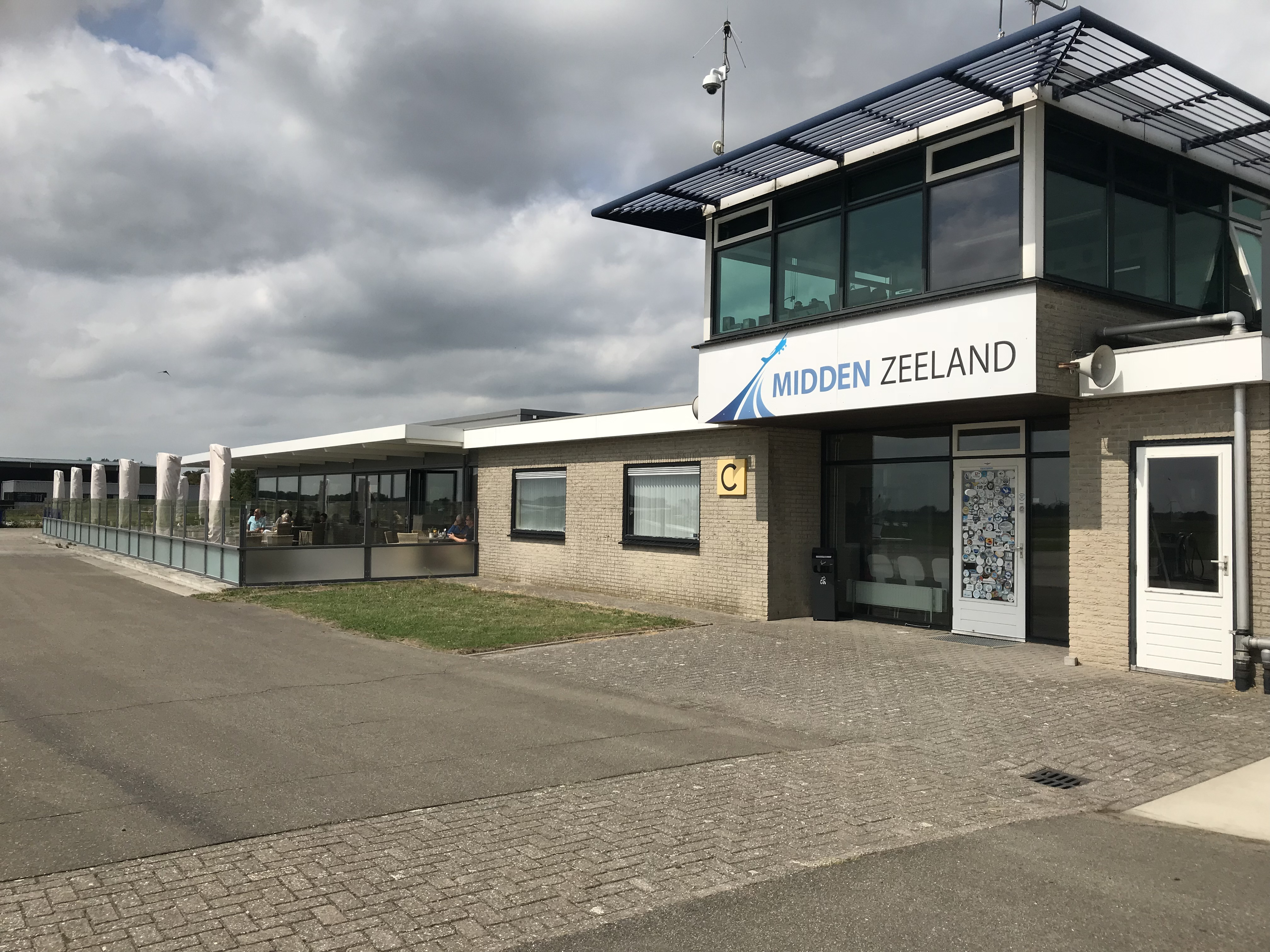
- IATA: none; ICAO: EHMZ

Summary
- Airport type: Civil
- Operator: Zeeland Airport BV
- Location: Middelburg
- Elevation AMSL: 6 ft (1.8 m)
- Coordinates: 51°30′44″N 003°43′52″E
- Website: https://www.vliegveldzeeland.nl/
- Interactive map of Midden-Zeeland Airport

Runways
Direction	Length		Surface
Direction	m	ft	Surface
09/27	1,000	3,281	Grass
- Sources: AIP

Midden-Zeeland Airport (ICAO: EHMZ), also known as Zeeland Airport, is an airport located 5 NM (9.3 km; 5.8 mi) east northeast of Middelburg, Zeeland, in the Netherlands, just south of the Veerse Meer lagoon. The airfield is uncontrolled (a non-towered airport) and has a single grass runway of 1,000 m (3,281 ft) long in the 09/27 direction, with a displaced threshold of 200 m (660 ft) for the 09 direction. It was founded in 1968 and officially opened in 1970.
