= Falköping Airport =

Falköping Airport Falköpings flygplats
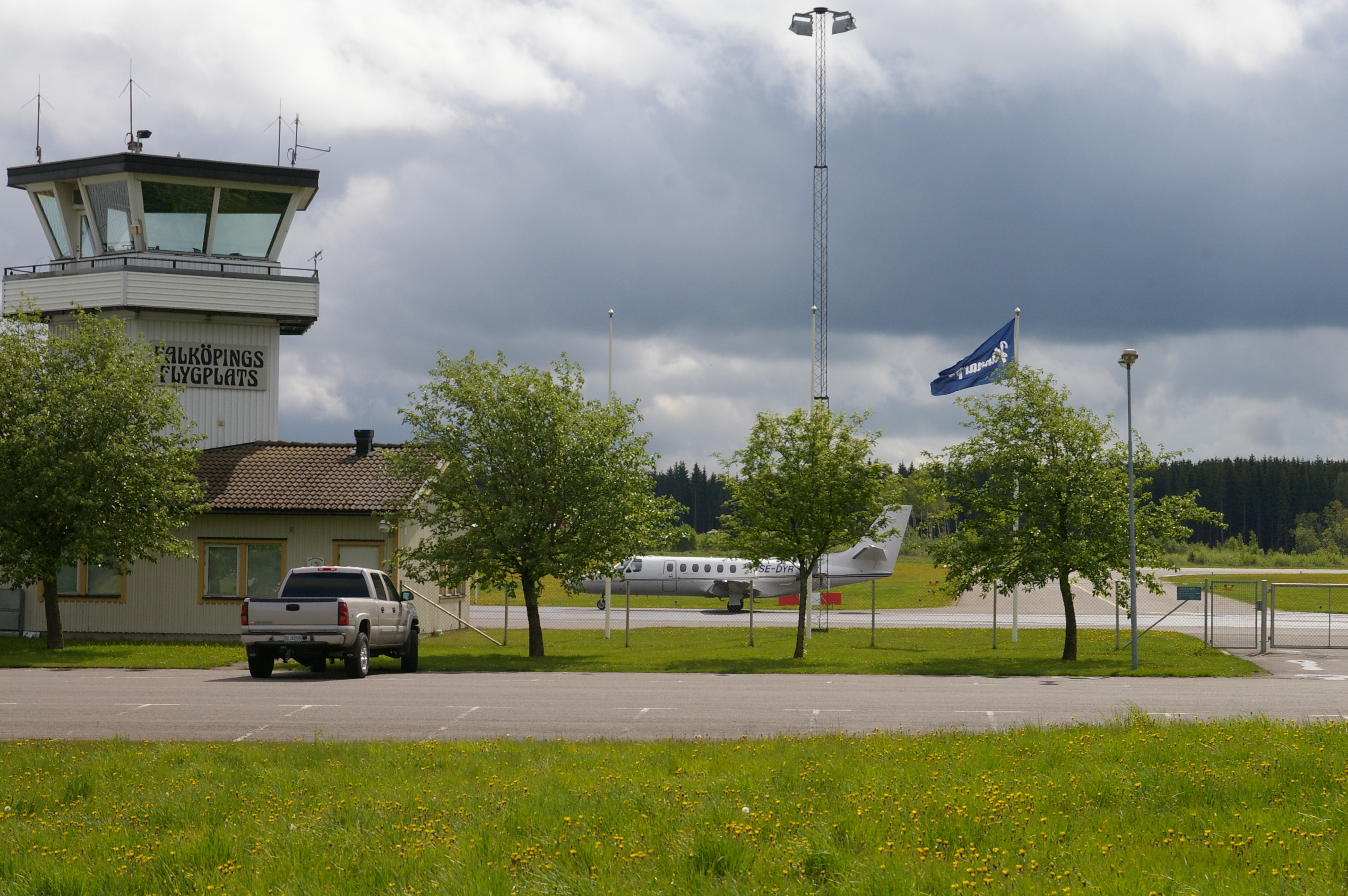
- IATA: none; ICAO: ESGK

Summary
- Airport type: Public
- Owner: Falköping Municipality
- Operator: Kinnarps AB
- Serves: Falköping
- Location: Falköping, Sweden
- Elevation AMSL: 230 ft / 750 m
- Coordinates: 58°10′31″N 13°35′30″E

Map
- Location of airport in Sweden

Runways
Direction	Length		Surface
Direction	ft	m	Surface
04R/22L	4,318	1,316	Asphalt
04L/22R	2,600	800	Grass

Falköping Airport is an airport located in Falköping for business and club aircraft. The airport was inaugurated in 1985 and was built by the government of Falköping Municipality to accommodate Kinnarps's desire to have a nearby airfield for its business flights. The airport is only a few hundred meters from Sikagården's industrial area on the outskirts of Falköping. At the airport, Falbygden's Aviation Club operates. The Aviation Club arranges training for glider certificates, motor flight certificates (EASA-PPL) and certificates for ultralight aircraft.
