= Draugen oil field =

Norwegian oil field in the Norwegian Sea

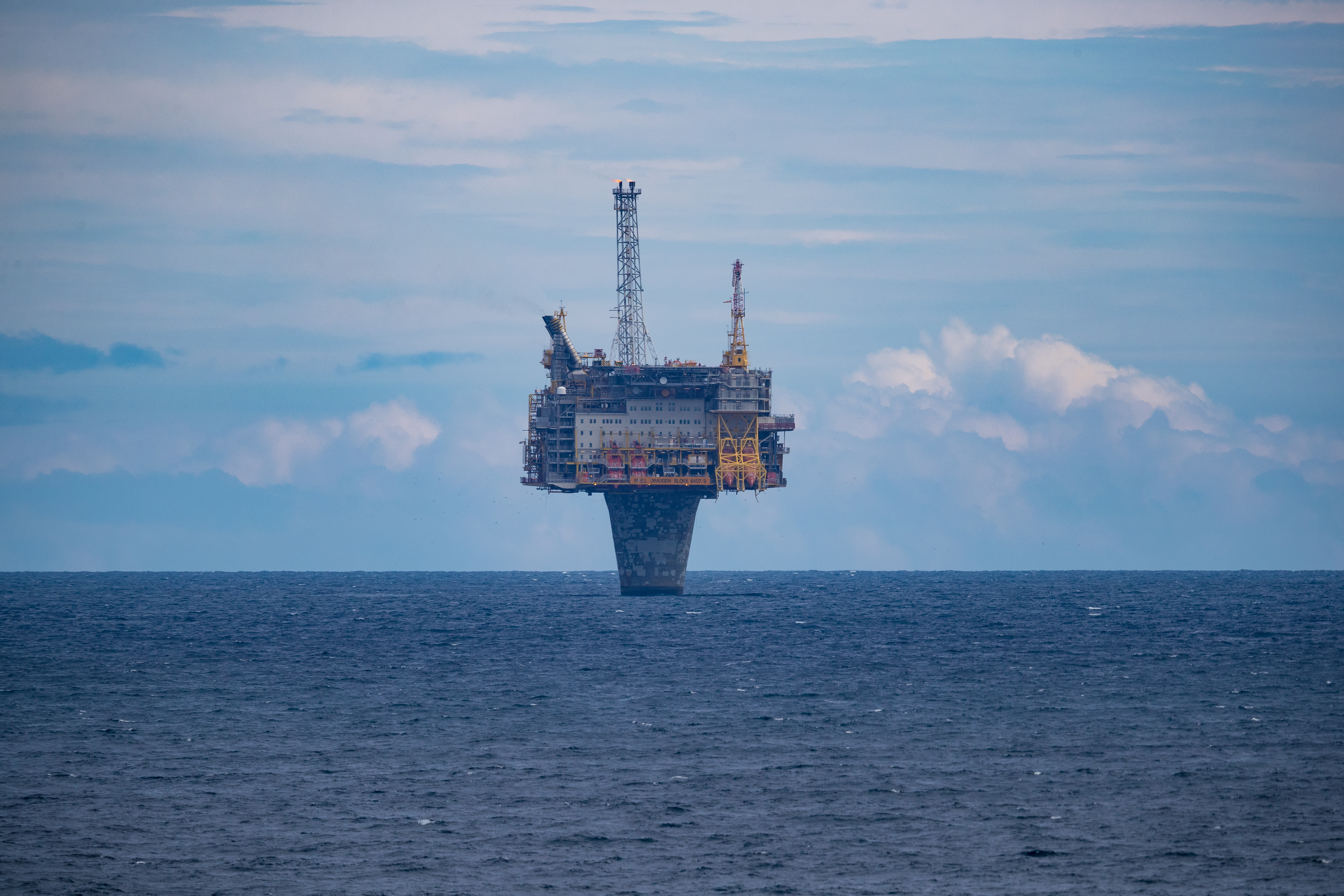
- The Draugen platform in July 2017

- Location within Norway
- Country: Norway
- Region: Norwegian Sea
- Block: 6407/9
- Offshore/onshore: Offshore
- Coordinates: 64°21′11.42″N 7°46′57.38″E
- Operator: AS OKEA

Field history
- Discovery: 1984
- Start of production: 1993

Production
- Producing formations: Rogn Formation

Draugen is an oil field in the Norwegian Sea with a sea depth of 250 metres (800 ft). It had been operated by A/S Norske Shell until sold to AS OKEA in 2018. The field has been developed with a concrete fixed facility and integrated topside. Stabilized oil is stored in tanks in the base of the facility. Two flowlines connect the facility to a floating loading buoy.

The Garn Vest and Rogn Sør deposits have been developed with a total of five subsea wells connected to the main facility at Draugen. The field has six subsea water injection wells. Additional resources in the Garn Vest structure came on stream in December 2001, while development of additional resources at the Rogn Sør structure were approved in the spring of 2001, coming on stream in January 2003.

== Reservoirs ==
The major reservoir is the Rogn Formation, a shallow marine sand bar of the Late Jurassic at around 1,600 metres (5,200 ft), while on the western side of the field is the Garn Formation of the Middle Jurassic. They are all producing reservoirs with good characteristics.

== Recovery and transport ==
The platform consists of a concrete mono-column with integrated deck. Oil transport is accomplished through tanker via floating buoy.

The Asgard transport pipeline is used for transport of natural gas to Kårstø.

== Removing the rig ==
In January 1997, it was decided to dispense with the maintenance-intensive drilling package on the Draugen platform because the well programme had been completed. In 2003 it was sold to Russia and installed on the ship Ispolin for drilling in the Russian sector of the Caspian

== Spills ==
In January 2008, a small amount of oil was spilled after a pipe broke while loading a tanker. The oil being loaded into the Navion Scandia tanker was spilled when the pipeline pressure became too high. The oil spilled was in such a small amount that much of it evaporated before being contained.

== Current status ==
New production wells are currently being drilled and more is being considered to increase output. Gas injection and water injection are used to increase production. CO_{2} injection has been rejected.

== Climate ==
Climate data for Draugen 1993-2020 (55 m)
Month	Jan	Feb	Mar	Apr	May	Jun	Jul	Aug	Sep	Oct	Nov	Dec	Year
Mean daily maximum °C (°F)	5.2 (41.4)	4.9 (40.8)	5.1 (41.2)	7.2 (45.0)	9.7 (49.5)	12.2 (54.0)	14.7 (58.5)	15.2 (59.4)	13.1 (55.6)	9.7 (49.5)	7.3 (45.1)	5.8 (42.4)	9.2 (48.5)
Mean daily minimum °C (°F)	2.7 (36.9)	2.3 (36.1)	2.6 (36.7)	4.4 (39.9)	6.6 (43.9)	9.3 (48.7)	11.8 (53.2)	12.5 (54.5)	10.6 (51.1)	7.6 (45.7)	5 (41)	3.4 (38.1)	6.6 (43.8)
Source: NOAA

== See also ==
- List of oil fields
