= M-Sola Heliport =

Airport in Riga, Latvia

- IATA: none; ICAO: EVSM

Summary
- Airport type: Private
- Owner: GM Helicopters, SIA
- Operator: GM Helicopters
- Location: Lielvārde, Latvia
- Coordinates: 56°39′56″N 24°54′12″E
- Website: http://www.gmhelicopters.com

Map
- Location of airport in Latvia

M-Sola Heliport (ICAO: EVSM) is an airport in Latvia. It is situated 62 km (39 mi) east of Riga and 9 km (5.6 mi) east of Lielvārde. Not to be confused with Military Lielvarde Air Base, which is hosted by Latvian Air Force.
