= Lubin-Obora Airfield =

Coordinates: 51°25′22″N 016°11′46″E

Lubin Airfield
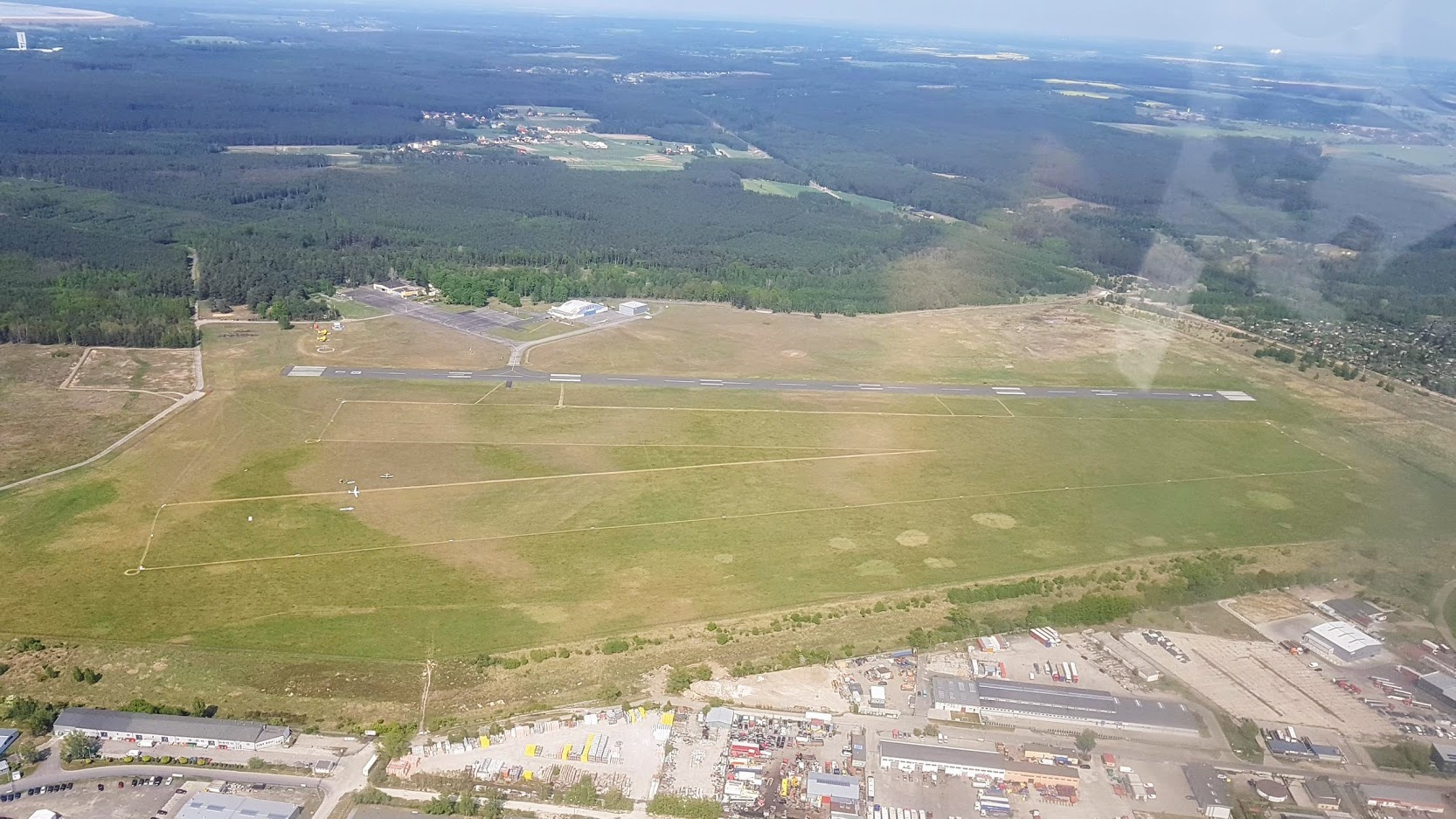
- IATA: none; ICAO: EPLU

Summary
- Airport type: Public
- Operator: Aeroklub Zagłębia Miedziowego
- Serves: Lubin, Głogów, Polkowice, Legnica (Copper Mining Region)
- Location: Lubin, Poland
- Elevation AMSL: 512 ft / 156 m
- Website: https://www.eplu.eu/

Map

Runways
Direction	Length		Surface
Direction	ft	m	Surface
31R/13L	3,281	1,000	Asphalt
31L/13R	2 788	850	Grass
11/29	2 952	900	Grass

Lubin Airfield (ICAO: EPLU) is a general aviation public use aerodrome not subject to certification, managed by the local aeroclub Aeroklub Zagłębia Miedziowego, in Lubin, Poland. It is located in the north part of the city around 3 km from its centre. The airport has a paved runway (RWY 31R/13L, 1000 m x 30 m) suitable for turboprop aircraft of the Beech Super King Air or Saab 340 class and small jet aircraft of Cessna Citation class, and two grass runways (RWY 31L/13R, 850 m x 100 m, RWY 11/29, 850 m x 100 m) for gliders and lighter aircraft.

Runway 31R has a "simplified cross" approach lighting, threshold edge and end of runway lights. Taxiways have edge lights. Also, runway 31R has a PAPI visual indicator of glide path. Lighting system is available on request. Airport used to have an NDB navigation system, but it has been inoperative.

Call sign and radio frequency: Lubin RADIO, 119,535 MHz.

The aerodrome is open to all aircraft on dates and times established by the airport managing body and published in AIP Polska VFR.

It is possible to hangar aircraft up to 4 m high. Fuel available: JET A-1, AVGAS 100LL, AVGAS UL91. The operator of the petrol station is Warter Aviation.
