= IJmuiden Heliport =

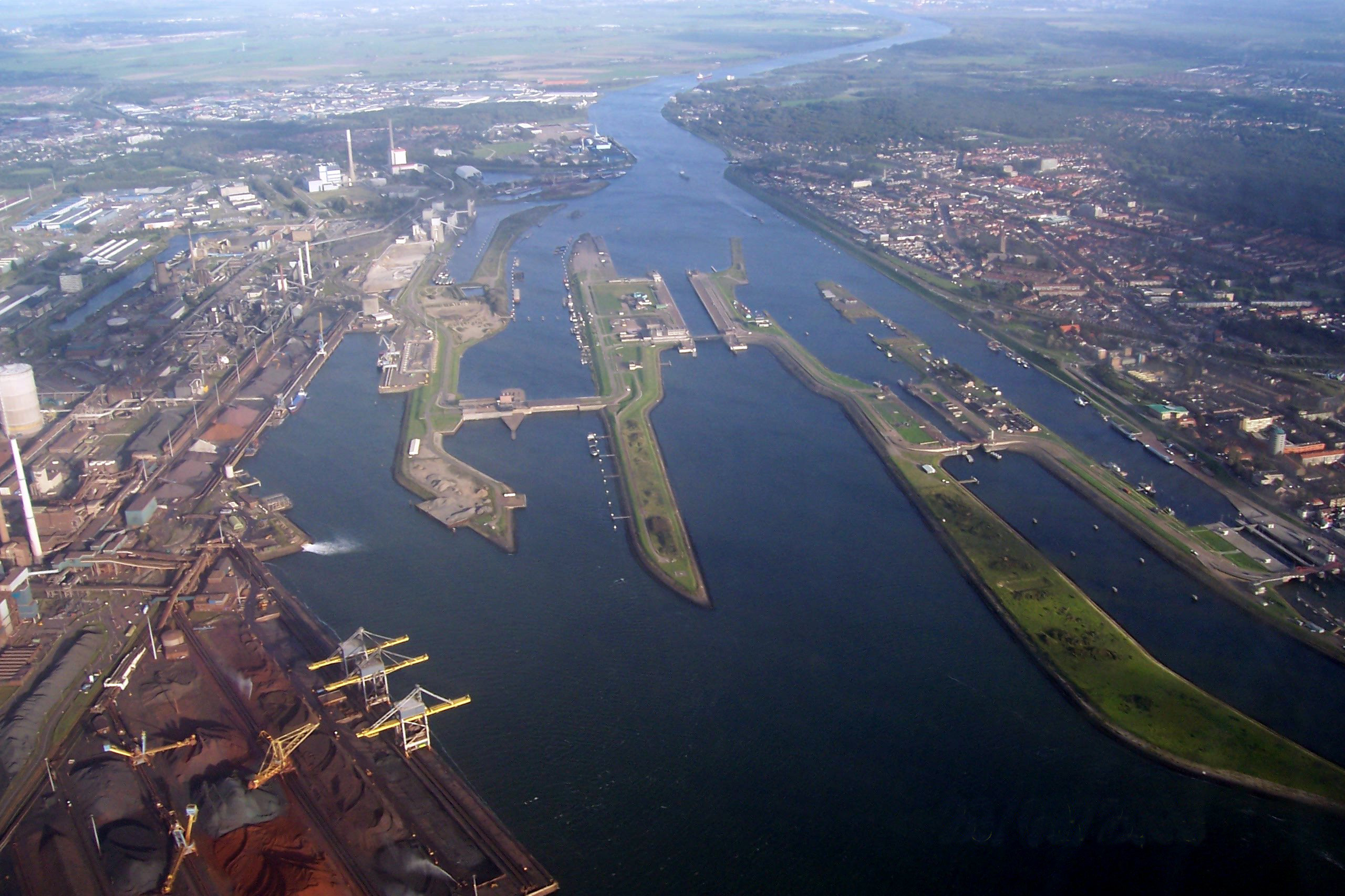
- IATA: none; ICAO: EHYP

Summary
- Airport type: Restricted
- Operator: Loodswezen
- Location: IJmuiden, Velsen, North Holland, Netherlands
- Elevation AMSL: 0 ft (0 m)
- Coordinates: 52°28′12″N 004°35′42″E

Map
- Location Of IJmuiden Heliport in Netherlands

IJmuiden Heliport (ICAO: EHYP), sometimes referred to as YPAD, is a small helipad located in the harbour area of the city of IJmuiden in the Dutch province of North Holland. It is exclusively used for maritime piloting services.
