= Krosno Airport =

Krosno Airport Port Lotniczy Krosno
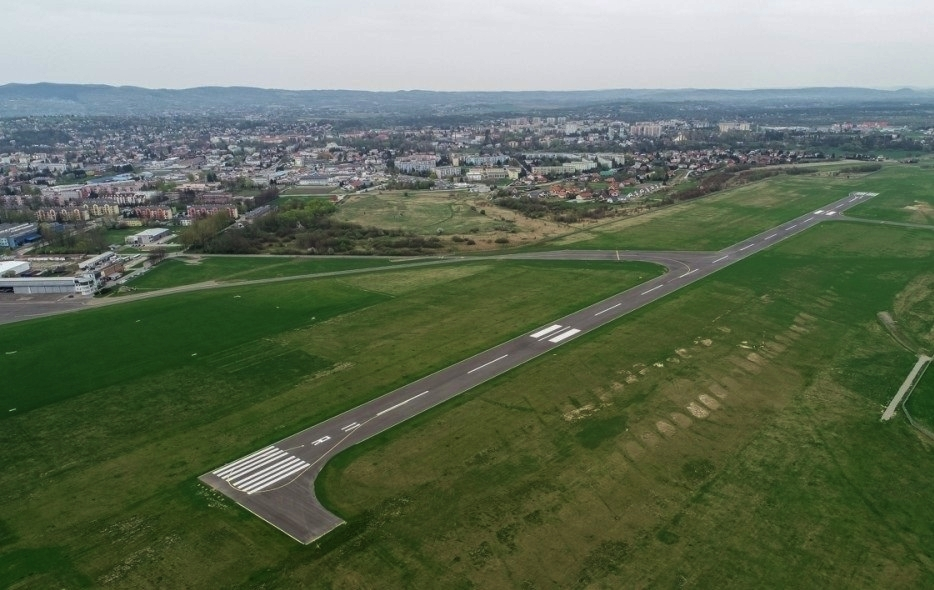
- IATA: none; ICAO: EPKR

Summary
- Airport type: Public
- Serves: Krosno, Poland
- Coordinates: 49°41′00″N 21°44′01″E
- Website: http://lotniskokrosno.com/

Map
- Location of airport in Poland

Runways
Direction	Length		Surface
Direction	m	ft	Surface
0	0	0	Concrete

Statistics (2007 +/- change from 2006)
- Passengers: 0
- Cargo (in tons): 0
- Takeoffs/Landings: 0
- Source: Polish AIP at EUROCONTROL

Krosno possesses an airport with disused concrete runway that could serve as a City-Airport. Town authorities are planning to start the modernisation by 2012.

As of July 2019, there are indications of recreational use.

== History ==
The airport was opened before the second World War, in 1932.
