= Vellinge Airport =

Airport in Vellinge, Sweden

Vellinge-Söderslätt Airfield Vellinge-Söderslätts Flygfält
- IATA: none; ICAO: ESTT

Summary
- Owner: Söderslätts Flygklubb
- Operator: Söderslätts Flygklubb
- Elevation AMSL: 12 ft / 4 m
- Coordinates: 55°23′40″N 013°01′30″E
- Website: www.estt.se
- Interactive map of Vellinge-Söderslätt Airfield

Runways
Direction	Length		Surface
Direction	ft	m	Surface
03/21	2,480	800	Grass

Vellinge Airfield (ICAO: ESTT), also known as Vellinge-Söderslätt Airfield (Swedish: Vellinge-Söderslätt Flygfält), is an airport in Vellinge, Sweden, run by Söderslätts Aviation Club (Swedish: Söderslätts Flygklubb). The club has about 80 members and owns one PA-28-180, one Evektor EV-97 Eurostar (Ultralight) and one Aerospool WT-9 Dynamic. The aviation club and airport was previously located at the Trelleborg/Maglarp airport located just a few hundred meters to the north, but was forced to relocate in 2003. The airport is active year-round, weather permitting, with school flights as well as a number of privately own aircraft operating from the airport.

== See also ==
- List of the largest airports in the Nordic countries
