= TrafficPort Venlo =

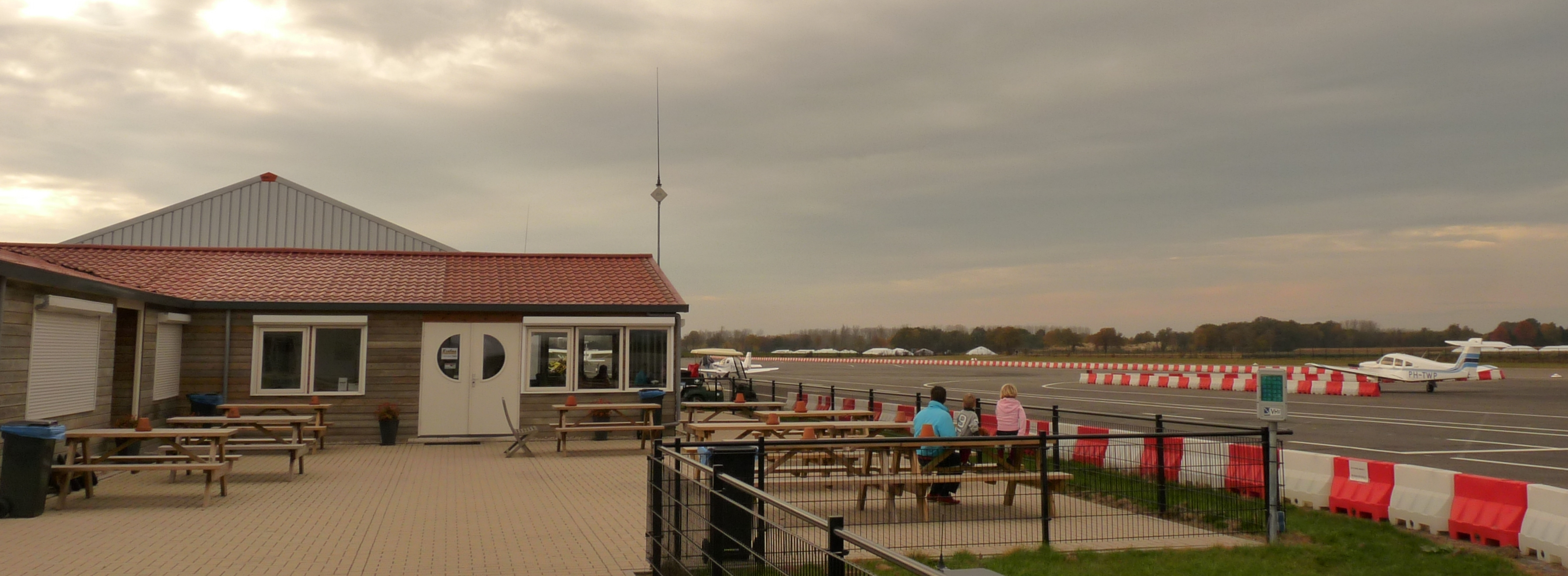
- IATA: none; ICAO: none

Summary
- Airport type: Closed
- Operator: TrafficPort Venlo / Cycloon Holland
- Location: Venlo, Netherlands
- Elevation AMSL: 75 ft (23 m)
- Coordinates: 51°23′35″N 006°03′46″E
- Website: Trafficport.nl
- Interactive map of TrafficPort Venlo

Runways
Direction	Length		Surface
Direction	m	ft	Surface
06/24	700	2,297	Asphalt

TrafficPort Venlo is an industrial complex and a former small aerodrome between Maasbree and Sevenum, in the south east of the Netherlands. It is located along the A67 motorway near the city of Venlo.

The airfield opened in October 2009. It had an asphalt runway of 700 meters (2,297 feet) long, suitable for smaller general aviation aircraft only. In December 2015, its imminent closure was announced. Local government bodies were not interested in investing in the airfield to help develop it further to allow business aviation, and income from recreational aviation alone proved to be insufficient. Following this decision, air traffic was restricted to helicopters only. Afterwards, truck trailer parking was built over the runway for Ewals Cargo Care. Only a small section of runway remains visible and there is no aviation activity on the site. The area is still referred to as TrafficPort on road signs however.
