= Terlet Airfield =

Terlet Airfield Vliegveld Terlet
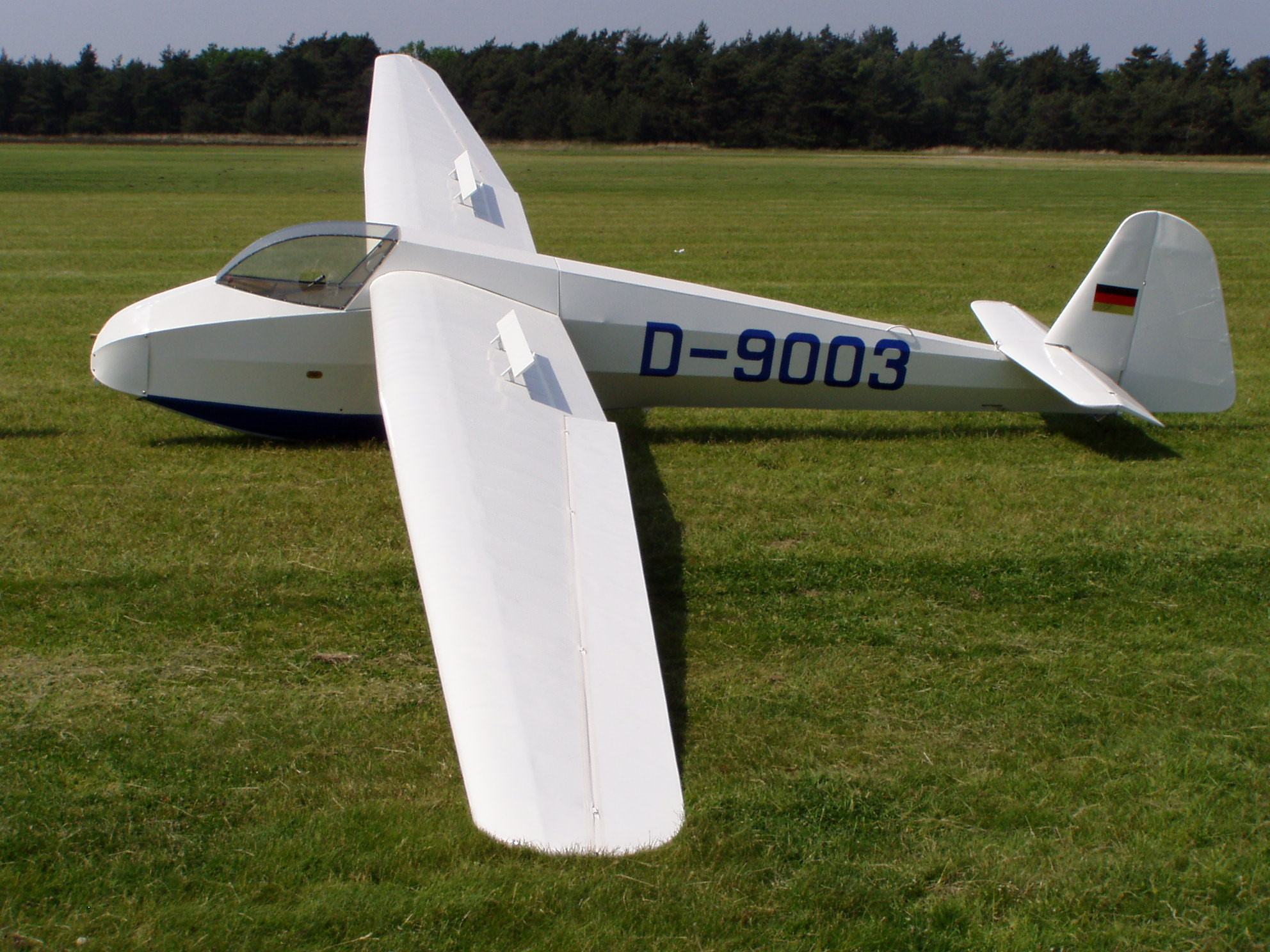
- IATA: none; ICAO: EHTL

Summary
- Airport type: Public
- Operator: Stichting Nationaal Zweefvliegcentrum Terlet
- Location: Arnhem
- Elevation AMSL: 276 ft / 84 m
- Coordinates: 52°03′26″N 005°55′28″E
- Website: http://www.terlet.nl
- Interactive map of Terlet Airfield

Runways
Direction	Length		Surface
Direction	m	ft	Surface
04L/22R	-	-	Grass
04C/22C	-	-	Grass
04R/22L	-	-	Grass
12/30	-	-	Grass
14L/32R	-	-	Grass
14R/32L	-	-	Grass
- Sources: AIP

Terlet Airfield (Dutch: Vliegveld Terlet) (ICAO: EHTL) is a small airfield in the Netherlands 2.5 NM (4.6 km; 2.9 mi) north of Arnhem in Gelderland and close to Deelen Air Base. It is used mainly by gliders and motor gliders, as well as some light aircraft such as the Aviat Husky, mainly used as tugs for the gliders. It has six grass winchtracks: 04L/22R, 04C/22C, 04R/22L, 12/30, 14R/32L and 14L/32R. Aerotows and self-launches are only conducted on the so-called "T-strip", which consists of runways 04L/22R and 12/30. The name comes from the T shape the runways form when viewed from above. Motorised aircraft are allowed to operate from those two strips only and only when prior permission is obtained.

The field was founded in 1952 by the Koninklijke Nederlandse Vereniging voor Luchtvaart (Royal Dutch Foundation for Aviation) to promote glider flying, though glider flying has taken place from the area since 1932. It is now home to the largest glider flying association in the Netherlands. Active gliding clubs at Terlet are: Gelderse Zweefvliegclub, Delftsche Studenten Aeroclub, Gliding Adventures Europe, Kennemer Zweefvlieg Club, Eerste Zaanse Zweefvlieg-Club, Zuidhollandse Vliegclub, and most recently Zweefvliegclub Flevo. Zweefvliegclub Ameland used to be part of this list but ceased operations on 13 September 2019.
