= Randers Airport =

Randers Airport Randers Flyveplads
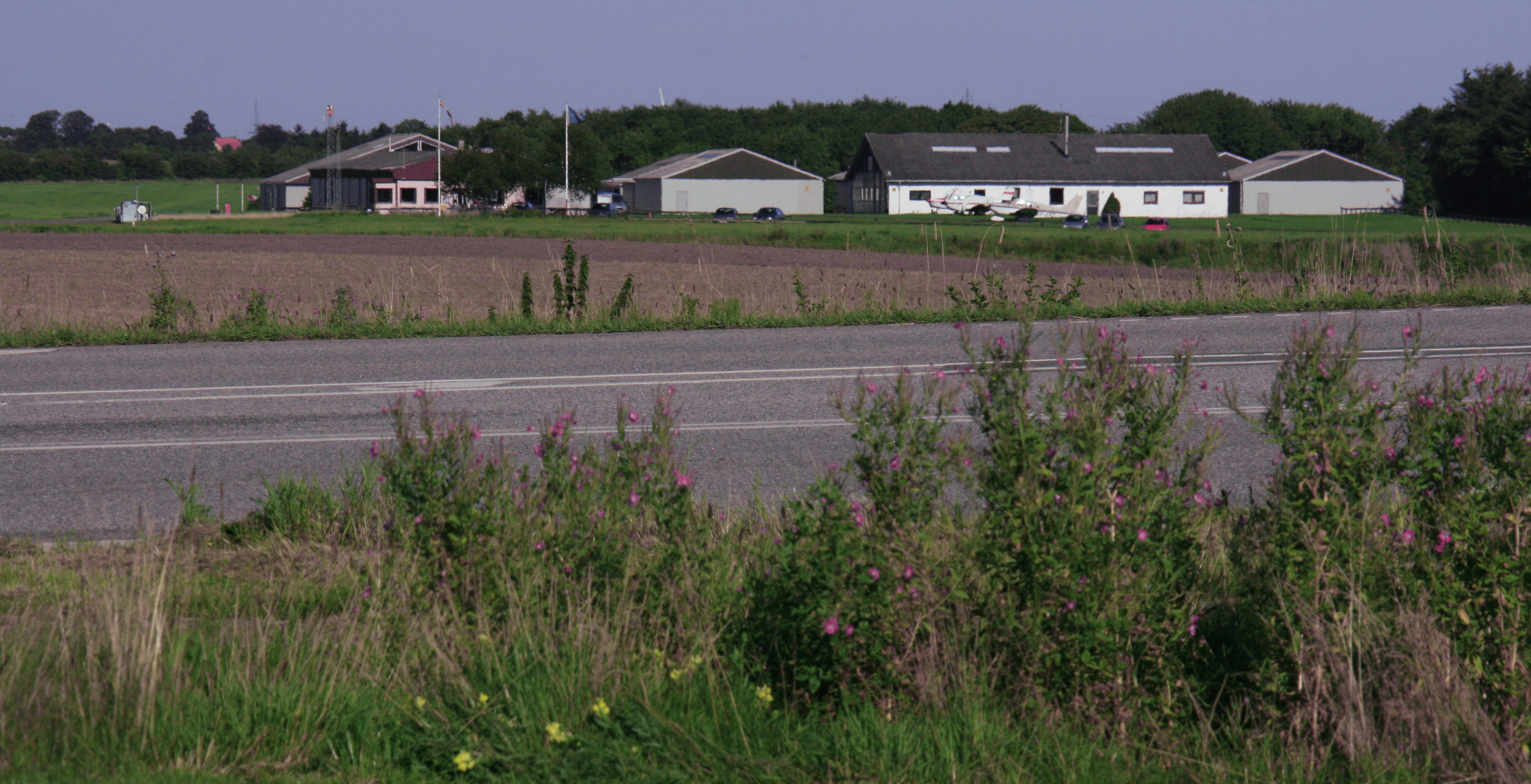
- IATA: none; ICAO: EKRD

Summary
- Location: Randers, Denmark
- Elevation AMSL: 154 ft / 47 m
- Coordinates: 56°30′17.83″N 10°1′56.81″E
- Interactive map of Randers Airport

Runways
Direction	Length		Surface
Direction	ft	m	Surface
07/25	2,952	900	Asphalt

Randers Airport (ICAO airport code EKRD) is an airport in Randers, Denmark. It is a municipally owned airfield, located near the village of Borup, 4.6 kilometers north of Randers Centrum. The site, which was first commissioned in 1967 has a 900-meter long and 23-meter wide asphalt 07-25 runway.

It is the second largest airport in eastern Jutland. The site is used primarily for private flights and training flights in smaller private planes, and also for small and medium corporate transports and taxi flights. The airport is home to Randers Flying Club. Randers Airport is also used as a link to other airports, including Billund and Aarhus. It has been considered extending Randers Airport to an international airport, but these plans have so far been shelved.
