= Lemvig Airfield =

Lemvig Airfield Lemvig flyveplads
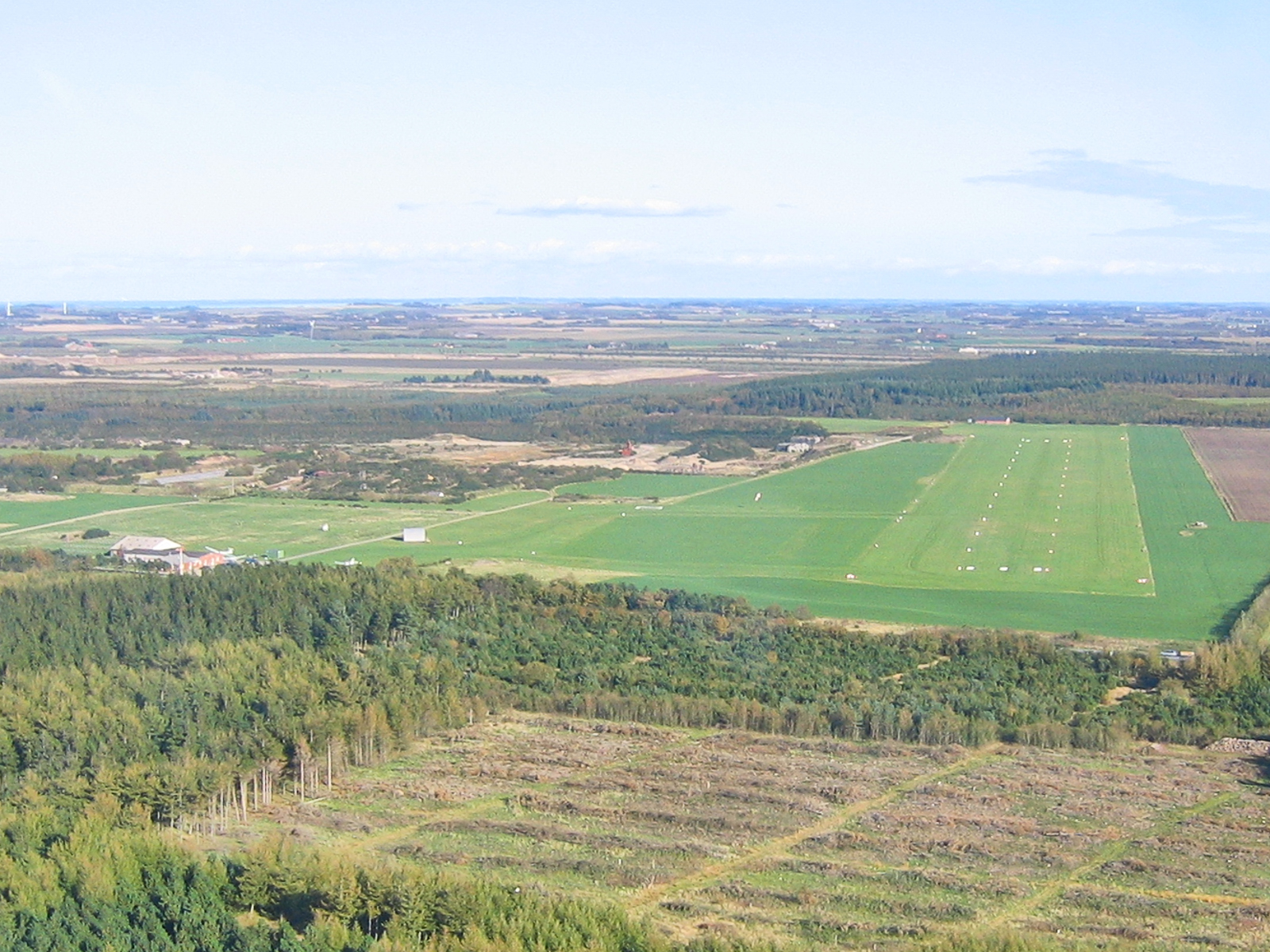
- IATA: none; ICAO: EKLV

Summary
- Location: Lemvig, Denmark
- Elevation AMSL: 100 ft / 30 m
- Coordinates: 56°30′10.97″N 8°18′41.59″E
- Interactive map of Lemvig Airfield

Runways
Direction	Length		Surface
Direction	ft	m	Surface
08/26	2,434	742	Grass

Lemvig Airfield is a recreational aerodrome 4 km south of Lemvig, Denmark.
