= Vesthimmerland Airfield =

Aars Airfield Vesthimmerland Airfield
- IATA: none; ICAO: EKVH

Summary
- Airport type: Public
- Serves: Vesthimmerland
- Location: Aars, Denmark
- Elevation AMSL: 119 ft / 36 m
- Coordinates: 56°50′49″N 009°27′31″E
- Website: www.ekvh.dk

Map
- Location of airfield in Denmark

Runways
Direction	Length		Surface
Direction	m	ft	Surface
11/29	1,212	3,976	Asphalt
17/35	550	1,804	Grass
- Source: Denmark AIS

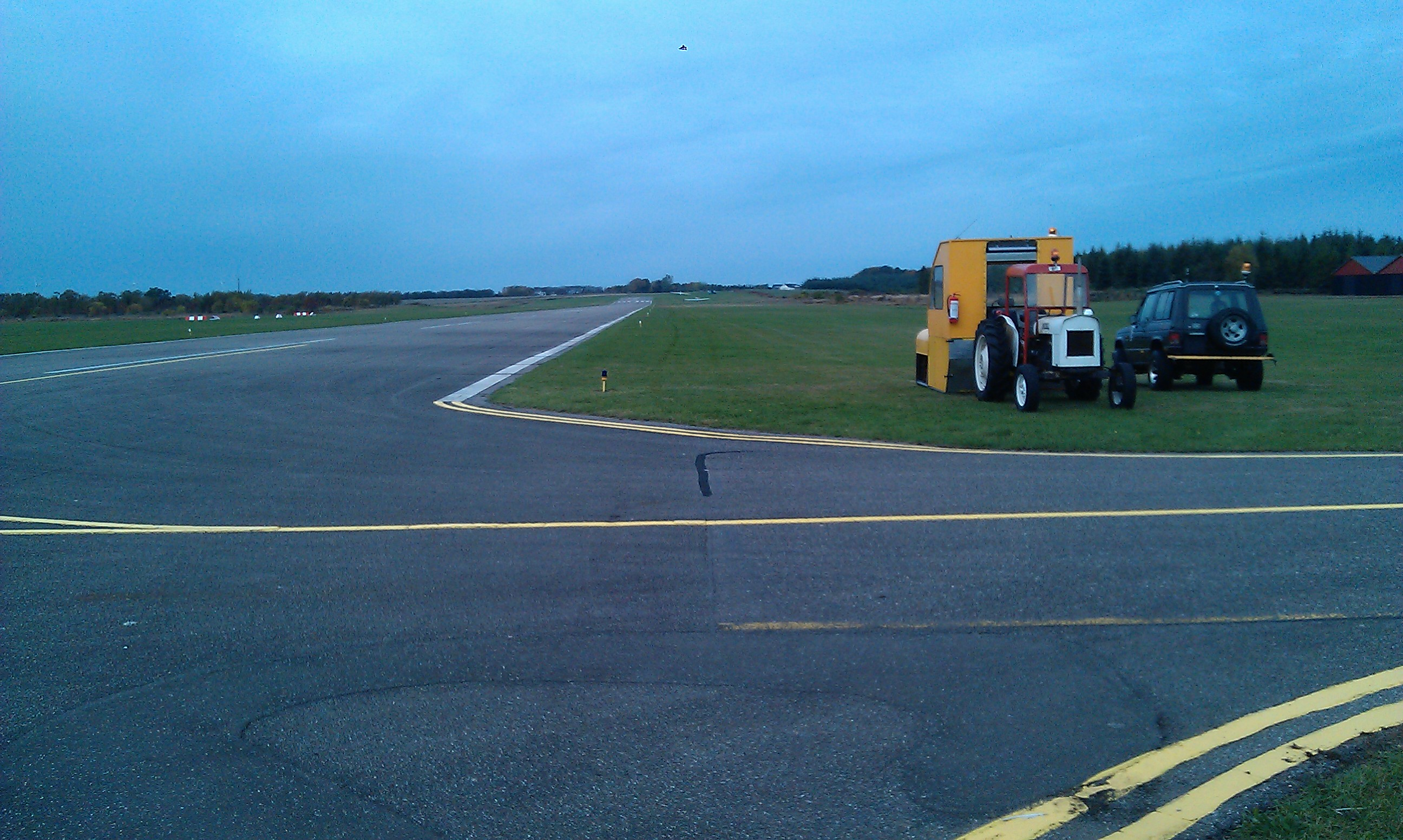

Vesthimmerland Airfield (Danish: Vesthimmerland Flyveplads) (ICAO: EKVH), also known as Aars Airfield, is a recreational aerodrome located 3.2 nautical miles (5.9 km; 3.7 mi) northwest of Aars, a town in Vesthimmerland Municipality (Vesthimmerlands Kommune), North Denmark Region (Region Nordjylland), Denmark.

== Facilities ==
The aerodrome resides at an elevation of 119 feet (36 m) above mean sea level. It has two runways: 11/29 with an asphalt surface measuring 1,212 by 23 metres (3,976 ft × 75 ft) and 17/35 with a grass surface measuring 550 by 30 metres (1,804 ft × 98 ft).
