= List of airports in Poland with unpaved runways =

This is a list of all major airports in Poland with unpaved runways (grass, gravel or dirt). All airports with unpaved runways also sharing a paved runway are not listed here. Since almost any approved flat area can be assigned as landing area or airfield, the following list is limited to unpaved airfields with a distinct purpose and functionality (in the present or in the past). Note that only the longest runway per airport has been listed. For a complete list of paved airports in Poland see "Airports in Poland with paved runways", for highway strips see "Highway strips in Poland".

Airport	City	IATA	ICAO	Purpose	El.(m)	Direct.	Surface	Size (m)	Coordinates
Aleksandrów Łódzki	Aleksandrów Łódzki			Multifunc.	190	10/28	Grass	600 x 100	51°47′26″N 19°16′12″E
Białousy	Sokółka			Private (Agrary)	179	10/28	Grass	760 x 60	53°24′17″N 23°13′42″E
Białystok-Krywlany (has also unusable paved rwy)	Białystok	QYY	EPBK	Sport	153	08/26	Grass	950 x 200	53°06′14″N 23°10′41″E
Bielsko-Biała-Aleksandrowice	Bielsko-Biała	QEO	EPBA	Sport	401	04/22	Grass	660 x 200	49°48′18″N 19°00′07″E
Bezmiechowa	Lesko			Sport	614	02/20	Grass	650 x 60	49°31′13″N 22°24′36″E
Brochocin (Łukaszów)	Złotoryja			Liquidated (Mil.)	202	10/28	Grass	1300 x 300	51°12′12″N 15°55′58″E
Bydgoszcz-Biedaszkowo (has also unusable paved rwy)	Bydgoszcz		EPBD	Sport	70	11/29	Grass	1100 x 150	53°06′11″N 17°57′20″E
Chojne	Sieradz			Sport	130		Grass		51°33′06″N 18°47′30″E
Chrcynno (has also unusable paved rwy)	Nasielsk			Sport	112	09/27	Grass		52°34′33″N 20°52′23″E
Dębica (Kalina)	Białogard			Liquidated (Mil.)	49	11/29	Grass	2500 x 400	53°56′37″N 15°37′13″E
Dęblin-Podlodów (Dęblin-Podlodówka)	Dęblin			Military	159	13/31	Grass	1000 x 100	51°37′38″N 22°11′53″E
Dębno Polskie (Dębno)	Rawicz			Sport	93		Grass		51°35′40″N 16°52′03″E
Elbląg	Elbląg	ZBG	EPEL	Sport	3	08/26	Grass	913 x 200	54°08′27″N 19°25′24″E
Gliwice-Trynek	Gliwice	QLC	EPGL	Sport	254	08/26	Grass	770 x 304	50°16′10″N 18°40′22″E
Góraszka	Sulejówek		EPGO	Multifunc.	110	14/32	Grass	600 x 30	52°11′04″N 21°16′52″E
Goszczanów	Warta			Multifunc.	136	10/28	Grass	600 x 100	51°47′57″N 18°29′35″E
Grudziądz-Lisie Kąty	Grudziądz		EPGI	Sport	35	14/32	Grass	890 x 300	53°31′28″N 18°50′58″E
Inowrocław-Latkowo	Inowrocław		EPIN	Sport	85	08/26	Grass	760 x 100	52°48′23″N 18°17′09″E
Inowrocław Military	Inowrocław		EPIR	Military	77		Grass		52°49′36″N 18°19′48″E
Iwonicz-Targowiska	Iwonicz-Zdrój		EPIW	Sport	294	12/30	Grass	1105 x 100	49°39′29″N 21°49′03″E
Jastarnia	Jastarnia		EPJA	Multifunc.	1	12/30	Grass	500 x 50	54°42′37″N 18°38′43″E
Jaworze	Recz			Military	105		Grass		53°18′41″N 15°42′50″E
Jelenia Góra	Jelenia Góra		EPJG	Sport	341	11/29	Grass	610 x 185	50°53′54″N 15°47′08″E
Jeżów Sudecki	Jelenia Góra		EPJS	Sport	559	01/19	Grass	615 x 100	50°55′42″N 15°45′35″E
Kętrzyn-Wilamowo (has also unusable paved rwy)	Kętrzyn		EPKE	Sport	139	17/35	Grass	800 x 100	54°02′42″N 21°25′46″E
Kraków-Łęg	Kraków				194		Grass		50°03′38″N 20°00′44″E
Kraków-Pobiednik Wielki	Kraków		EPKP	Sport	198	12/30	Grass	1048 x 100	50°05′23″N 20°12′06″E
Kroczewo	Zakroczym			Military	102		Grass		52°28′25″N 20°32′21″E
Krosno (has also unusable paved rwy)	Krosno		EPKR	Sport	280	11L/29R	Grass	1040 x 100	49°40′59″N 21°44′01″E
Krzewica	Międzyrzec Podl.			Liquidated (Mil.)	155	06/24	Grass	2250 x ?	52°03′14″N 22°42′02″E
Łagowo	Dolsk			Sport	90		Grass		51°58′00″N 16°59′00″E
Łańsk / Gryźliny	Olsztynek		EPLN	Multifunc.	164	12/30	Grass	860 x 60	53°36′29″N 20°20′40″E
Leszno-Strzyżewice	Leszno		EPLS	Sport	94	06/24	Grass	920 x 100	51°50′06″N 16°31′19″E
Lublin-Radawiec	Lublin	QLU	EPLR	Sport	240	11/29	Grass	950 x 100	51°13′18″N 22°23′40″E
Międzylesie (Instytut PCZD)	Warsaw			Health	98	15/33	Grass	60 x 45 (Heliport)	52°13′01″N 21°11′56″E
Mikołajki	Mikołajki		EPMJ	Multifunc.	129		Grass		53°48′28″N 21°33′21″E
Mirosławice (Rogów Sobócki)	Sobótka		EPMR	Multifunc. Sport	154	18/36	Grass	600 x 100	50°57′30″N 16°46′12″E
Nadarzyce Poligon	Wałcz			Military	126	05/23	Grass	1100 x 50	53°28′12″N 16°27′24″E
Namysłów	Namysłów			Liquidated (Mil.)	150	09/27	Grass	2000 x 80	51°03′51″N 17°35′37″E
Nowy Sącz-Łososina Dolna	Nowy Sącz		EPNL	Sport	254	04/22	Grass	800 x 150	49°44′47″N 20°37′27″E
Nowy Targ	Nowy Targ	QWS	EPNT	Sport	628	12/30	Grass	1677 x 120	49°27′45″N 20°03′01″E
Oława-Stanowice (Marcinkowice)	Oława			Liquidated (Mil.)	128	13/31	Grass	2500 x 60	50°58′43″N 17°14′51″E
Opole-Polska Nowa Wieś	Opole	QPM	EPOP	Sport	188	07/25	Grass	750 x 100	50°38′00″N 17°46′54″E
Orsk	Szlichtyngowa			Health Logist.	123		Grass		51°34′02″N 16°21′20″E
Ostrów Wlkp.-Michałków	Ostrów Wlkp.	QDG	EPOM	Sport	143	11/29	Grass	900 x 100	51°42′09″N 17°50′49″E
Pińczów	Pińczów		EPPC	Sport	186	11/29	Grass	700 x 180	50°31′04″N 20°30′58″E
Płock	Płock	QPC	EPPL	Sport	101	13/31	Grass	680 x 300	52°33′44″N 19°43′17″E
Poznań-Kobylnica (Ligowiec)	Poznań		EPPK	Sport	86	07/25	Grass	750 x 100	52°26′02″N 17°02′38″E
Przasnysz	Przasnysz			Industry Sport	120	12/30	Grass	800 x 60	53°00′18″N 20°56′18″E
Radom-Piastów	Radom		EPRP	Sport	145	06/24	Grass	710 x 100	51°28′53″N 21°06′37″E
Radzewice	Mosina			Private	76	05/30	Grass	700 x 100	52°12′40″N 16°59′50″E
Radzyń Podl.-Marynin	Radzyń Podl.			Closed (Mil.)	148		Grass		51°45′15″N 22°37′43″E
Rostki (Rostken) (initially concrete)	Orzysz			Liquidated (Mil.)	118	07/25	Grass	2000 x 20	53°42′35″N 21°54′35″E
Rybnik-Gotartowice	Rybnik		EPRG	Sport	255	09/27	Grass	660 x 100	50°04′15″N 18°37′42″E
Rzeszów (EPRJ) (borders EPRZ)	Rzeszów		EPRJ	Private (Private)	202	08/26	Grass	705 x 18	50°06′17″N 22°02′58″E
Skibno	Sianów			Sport	27		Grass		54°14′42″N 16°18′24″E
Słupsk-Krępa	Słupsk		EPSR	Sport	75	09/27	Grass	710 x 100	54°24′30″N 17°05′44″E
Smolnik	Komańcza			Sport	598	13/31	Grass	500 x 20	49°16′30″N 22°07′13″E
Stalowa Wola-Turbia	Stalowa Wola	QXQ	EPST	Sport	150	10/28	Grass	910 x 100	50°37′39″N 21°59′53″E
Stare Drawsko	Czaplinek			Sport	145		Grass		53°36′42″N 16°12′54″E
Suwałki	Suwałki	ZWK	EPSU	Sport	178	06/24	Grass	640 x 100	54°04′22″N 22°53′57″E
Świdnik	Świdnik		EPSW	Sport	203	06/24	Grass	1200 x 50	51°13′55″N 22°41′25″E
Szczecin-Dąbie	Szczecin		EPSD	Sport	1	09/27	Grass	900 x 100	53°23′31″N 14°38′02″E
Watorowo	Chełmno			Private	91	08/26	Grass	804 x 59	53°17′48″N 18°24′48″E
Wejherowo	Wejherowo			Health	83		Grass		54°35′28″N 18°12′00″E
Weremień	Lesko			Sport	407		Grass		49°26′48″N 22°19′12″E
Włocławek-Kruszyn	Włocławek	QWK	EPWK	Sport	66	09/27	Grass	1000 x 100	52°35′05″N 19°00′56″E
Wrocław-Szymanów (Szewce)	Wrocław		EPWS	Sport	119	14/32	Grass	770 x 150	51°12′21″N 16°59′54″E
Wschowa-Łysiny	Wschowa			Closed (Mil.)	110	06/24	Grass	2000 x 400	51°50′07″N 16°14′52″E
Wysokie Maz.	Wysokie Maz.			Closed (Mil.)	147		Grass		52°55′53″N 22°31′35″E
Zamość-Mokre	Zamość		EPZA	Sport	229	12/30	Grass	800 x 60	50°42′07″N 23°12′15″E
Żar (Góra Żar)	Międzybrodzie Żywieckie		EPZR	Sport	385	05/23	Grass	390 x 75	49°46′16″N 19°13′04″E
Zielona Góra-Przylep	Zielona Góra		EPZP	Sport	77	06/24	Grass	880 x 100	51°58′44″N 15°27′50″E
Zgorzelec-Żarska Wieś	Zgorzelec			Sport Commerce	224	11/29	Grass	800 x 60	51°12′12″N 15°07′42″E

== See also ==
- List of airports in Poland
- List of airports in Poland with paved runways
- List of airports
