= List of airports in Poland with paved runways =

The following compilation lists all airports in Poland with at least one paved runway (asphalt, concrete or bitumen). It encompasses airports of various types and of varying importance and usage. Only the paved runways are specified, although many airports exploit their grass runways solely or equally frequently. Many airports listed here are former military airfields that are either unused, closed, disintegrated or liquidated. On the other hand, many important unpaved airfields are not listed. Those are listed at "Airports in Poland with unpaved runways". It does not list highway strips either, those can be found at "Highway strips in Poland".

Airport	City	IATA	ICAO	Purpose	El.(m)	Direct.	Surface	Runway (m)	Coordinates
Arłamów (Łodzinka Górna / Krajna)	Bircza		EPAR	Unused (Gov)	441	16/34	Conc/Bitm	1200 x 35	49°39′30″N 22°30′51″E
Bednary	Pobiedziska			Private (Mil.)	104	10/28	Asphalt	2300 x 30	52°32′04″N 17°13′07″E
Biała Podlaska	Biała Podlaska		EPBP	Military	151	06R/24L 06L/24R	Asphalt Asphalt	3300 x 60 2260 x 30	52°00′21″N 23°08′37″E
Białystok-Krywlany (only grass used)	Białystok	QYY	EPBK	Sport, Border guard, EMT	153	14/32	Concrete	08/26 950 x 200, 01/19 880 x 200, 14R/32L 830 x 100, 14L/32R 830 x 40 - all grass (1420 x 50 concrete not used)	53°06′05″N 23°10′14″E
Bielsko-Biała Kaniów	Kaniów		EPKW	Industry	246	13/31	Asphalt	947 x 24	49°56′21″N 19°01′20″E
Borne Sulinowo	Borne Sulinowo		EPBS	Sport	143	11/29 12/30	Asph/Conc Asph/Conc	235 x 15 220 x 10	53°34′30″N 16°31′27″E
Borsk (Wdzydze)	Czersk Pom.			Closed (Mil)	142	11/29	Concrete	2300 x 30	53°57′07″N 17°56′34″E
Broczyno	Czaplinek			Closed (Mil)	152	11/29	Asphalt	2250 x 30	53°31′10″N 16°17′03″E
Brzeg-Skarbimierz	Brzeg			Closed (Mil)	154	09/27	Concrete	2500 x 60	50°50′13″N 17°24′49″E
Bydgoszcz-Biedaszkowo (only grass used)	Bydgoszcz		EPBD	Sport	70	13/31	Concrete	1000 x 50	53°06′11″N 17°57′20″E
Bydgoszcz-Szwederowo (I.J. Paderewski)	Bydgoszcz	BZG	EPBY	Civil	72	08/26	Asph/Conc	2500 x 60	53°05′48″N 17°58′39″E
Cewice (Siemirowice / Łebunia)	Lębork			Military	151	07/25	Asphalt	2500 x 50	54°24′59″N 17°45′52″E
Chojna	Chojna			Closed (Mil.)	57	09/27	Concrete	2300 x 50	52°56′22″N 14°25′18″E
Chrcynno (only grass used)	Nasielsk			Sport	112	09/27	Concrete	1250 x 30	52°34′33″N 20°52′23″E
Częstochowa-Rudniki	Częstochowa	CZW	EPCH	Sport Military	262	08/26	Concrete	2000 x 60	50°53′05″N 19°12′08″E
Darłówek (Żukowo)	Darłowo		EPDA	Unused (Navy)	3	05R/23L 05L/23R	Asphalt Asphalt	700 x 30 500 x 30	54°24′13″N 16°21′17″E
Dęblin-Irena	Dęblin		EPDE	Military Education	119	12/30	Asphalt	2500 x 60	51°33′04″N 21°53′30″E
Dęblin-Ułęż	Dęblin			Military	170	13/31	Asphalt	1300 x 30	51°37′09″N 22°06′06″E
Debrzno	Debrzno			Closed (Mil)	155	07/25	Asphalt	2500 x 60	53°31′28″N 17°15′33″E
Gdańsk-Rębiechowo (L. Wałęsa)	Gdańsk	GDN	EPGD	Civil	149	11/29	Asphalt	2800 x 45	54°22′39″N 18°27′59″E
Gdańsk-Wrzeszcz (Danzig-Langfuhr)	Gdańsk			Disintegrated (Mil.)	7	03/21	Asphalt	1700 x 55	54°23′46″N 18°36′09″E
Gdynia-Babie Doły (Oksywie)	Gdynia	QYD	EPOK	Military	44	14/32 09/27	Concrete Asphalt	2500 x 60 575 x 30	54°34′44″N 18°31′09″E
Gostyń-Gola	Gostyń			Liquidated (Mil)	108	11/29	Concrete	1000 x 80	51°53′14″N 16°58′34″E
Gorzów-Wojcieszyce (Różanki) (under constr.)	Gorzów Wlkp.			Sport EMT	45	09/27	Asphalt		52°47′16″N 15°17′37″E
Kąkolewo	Grodzisk Wlkp.			Military	92	10/28	Asphalt	2250 x 30	52°14′04″N 16°14′39″E
Kamieńsk-Orla Góra	Kamieńsk			Agrary	310	09/27	Asphalt	1000 x 45	51°13′32″N 19°25′20″E
Katowice-Muchowiec	Katowice		EPKM	Sport	277	05/23	Concrete	1100 x 30 (1520 x 90)	50°14′19″N 19°02′04″E
Katowice-Pyrzowice	Katowice	KTW	EPKT	Civil	303	09/27	Concrete	2800 x 60	50°28′28″N 19°04′48″E
Kętrzyn-Wilamowo (only grass used)	Kętrzyn		EPKE	Sport	139	10/28 14/32	Concrete Concrete	900 x 30 500 x 30	54°02′37″N 21°25′57″E
Kielce-Masłów	Kielce	QKI	EPKA	Sport	308	11/29	Asph/Conc	900 x 30	50°53′49″N 20°43′53″E
Kluczewo	Stargard Szcz.			Closed (Mil.)	36	15/33	Concrete	2500 x 60	53°16′50″N 14°58′00″E
Kołobrzeg-Bagicz (Podczele)	Kołobrzeg			Sport (Mil)	4	08/26	Concrete	2500 x 40	54°12′02″N 15°41′13″E
Konarzyny (Sąpolno)	Chojnice			Liquidated (Mil)	150	07/25	Asphalt	2250 x 30	53°49′31″N 17°21′10″E
Konin-Kazimierz Bisk.	Konin		EPKB	Sport	110	09/27	Asphalt	640 x 30	52°19′09″N 18°10′04″E
Koszalin-Zegrze Pom.	Koszalin	OSZ	EPKZ	Sport Military	76	07/25	Concrete	2500 x 60	54°02′32″N 16°15′51″E
Kraków-Balice (John Paul II)	Kraków	KRK	EPKK	Civil; Military	241	07/25	Concrete	2550 x 60	50°04′40″N 19°47′06″E
Kraków-Czyżyny (Rakowice)	Kraków			Disintegrated	216	11/29	Concrete	1900 x 45	50°04′57″N 19°59′57″E
Krosno (only grass used)	Krosno		EPKR	Sport	280	11/29	Asphalt	1050 x 60	49°40′52″N 21°44′16″E
Krzywa (Osła / Różyniec)	Bolesławiec			Closed (Mil)	202	10/28	Concrete	2450 x 60	51°18′38″N 15°43′40″E
Legnica	Legnica		EPLE	Sport	124	08/26	Concrete	1600 x 40	51°10′58″N 16°10′41″E
Lipki Wielkie (Santok)	Gorzów Wlkp.			Agrary	45	05/23	Asphalt	800 x 25	52°42′58″N 15°30′42″E
Lubin-Obora	Lubin		EPLU	Civil	156	13/31	Asphalt	1000 x 30	51°25′23″N 16°11′45″E
Lublin-Świdnik	Lublin (Świdnik)	LUZ	EPLB	Civil	203	07/25	Asphalt	2520 x 45	51°14′24″N 22°42′48″E
Lublin-Niedźwiada (in planning)	Lublin			Civil	177	11/29	Asphalt	2800 x 45	51°32′46″N 22°38′43″E
Łask (Mauryca)	Łask		EPLK	Military	193	11/29	Concrete	2500 x 60	51°33′07″N 19°10′46″E
Łebień (Lędziechowo)	Lębork			Closed (Mil)	91	17/35	Asphalt	2200 x 40	54°40′09″N 17°44′35″E
Łęczyca-Leźnica Wielka	Łęczyca		EPLY	Military	115	10/28	Asphalt	2500 x 60	52°00′17″N 19°08′44″E
Łódź-W.Reymont	Łódź	LCJ	EPLL	Civil	185	07/25	Asphalt	2500 x 45	51°43′19″N 19°23′53″E
Malbork (Królewo Malborskie)	Malbork		EPMB	Military	5	08/26	Concrete	2500 x 60	54°01′36″N 19°08′11″E
Mielec	Mielec		EPML	Industry	167	09/27 18/36	Concrete Concrete	2500 x 45 660 x 25	50°19′21″N 21°27′44″E
Mierzęcice-Zendek	Pyrzowice			Disintegrated (Mil)	303	13/31 05/23	Asphalt Asphalt	950 x 40 700 x30	50°28′48″N 19°04′59″E
Mińsk Mazowiecki (Janów)	Mińsk Maz.		EPMM	Military	184	09/27	Concrete	2500 x 40	52°11′44″N 21°39′25″E
Mirosławiec (Borujsko)	Mirosławiec		EPMI	Military	151	12/30	Concrete	2500 x 50	53°23′41″N 16°04′59″E
Modlin	Nowy Dwór Maz.	WMI	EPMO	Civil	104	08/26	Concrete	2500 x 60	52°27′04″N 20°39′03″E
Muszaki	Nidzica			Closed (Mil)	136	11/29	Asphalt	500 x 30	53°21′45″N 20°40′16″E
Nadarzyce	Wałcz			Closed (Mil)	125	17/35	Asphalt	2000 x 30	53°27′18″N 16°29′24″E
Nowa Dęba	Nowa Dęba		EPND	Military	174				50°25′25″N 21°47′49″E
Nowe Miasto nad Pilicą	Nowe Miasto n.P.		EPNM	Closed (Mil)	156	10/28	Concrete	2300 x 60	51°37′39″N 20°32′09″E
Oleśnica	Oleśnica			Military	159	07/25	Asphalt	2280 x 30	51°12′53″N 17°26′18″E
Olsztyn-Dajtki	Olsztyn	QYO	EPOD	Sport	133	10/28	Concrete	850 x 100	53°46′21″N 20°24′54″E
Opole-Kamień Śląski (Oppeln-Groß Stein)	Opole		EPKN EPKA	Commerce	208	11/29	Asph/Conc	2300 x 60	50°31′45″N 18°05′05″E
Orneta	Orneta			Private (Mil)	53	06/24	Concrete	2000 x 30	54°07′36″N 20°05′14″E
Ostrów Maz.-Grądy	Ostrów Maz.			Forestry	121	09/27	Concrete	800 x 30	52°50′13″N 21°46′43″E
Pięćmorgi	Świecie			Forestry	98	16/34	Asphalt	800 x 80	53°34′34″N 18°29′09″E
Pieniężnica (Koczała)	Biały Bór			Liquidated (Mil)	162	08/26	Concrete	2000 x 60	53°52′16″N 16°59′59″E
Piła	Piła		EPPI	Sport Military	79	03/21	Concrete	2500 x 60	53°10′14″N 16°42′41″E
Piotrków Tryb.-Bujny (new rwy, not on map)	Piotrków Tryb.		EPPT	Sport	205	03/21	Asphalt	700 x 30	51°22′59″N 19°41′18″E
Płoty (Maków)	Płoty			Military	47	11/29	Asph/Conc	2300 x 30	53°45′39″N 15°17′24″E
Powidz	Witkowo		EPPW	Military	113	11R/29L 11L/29R	Concrete Concrete	3525 x 60 2725 x 30	52°22′45″N 17°51′04″E
Poznań-Krzesiny	Poznań		EPKS	Military	84	12/30 07/25	Concrete Asph/Conc	2500 x 60 1780 x 55	52°19′53″N 16°58′06″E
Poznań-Ławica	Poznań	POZ	EPPO	Civil; Military	94	11/29	Concrete	2500 x 50	52°25′16″N 16°49′35″E
Pruszcz Gdański	Pruszcz Gd.		EPPR	Sport Military	6	10/28	Concrete	2000 x 60	54°14′54″N 18°40′13″E
Przemków-Trzebień (Pstrąże, Strachów)	Przemków			Closed (Mil)	158	09/27	Concrete	1700 x 60	51°23′17″N 15°39′19″E
Radom-Sadków (Mazowiecki)	Radom	RDO	EPRA	Civil; Military	180	07/25	Bitumen	2000 x 60	51°23′20″N 21°12′45″E
Rzeszów-Jasionka	Rzeszów	RZE	EPRZ	Civil	211	09/27	Asph/Conc	3200 x 45	50°06′36″N 22°01′09″E
Słupsk-Redzikowo	Słupsk	OSP	EPSK	Closed (EMT/Mil)	66	09/27	Concrete	2200 x 60	54°28′43″N 17°06′23″E
Śniatowo	Kamień Pom.			Military	20	11/29	Concrete	2250 x 60	53°52′42″N 14°51′52″E
Sochaczew-Bielice	Sochaczew		EPSO	Military	79	10/28	Asphalt	2500 x 60	52°11′55″N 20°17′23″E
Spała / Glinnik Nowy	Tomaszów Maz.		EPTM	Military	174	11/29	Asphalt	2000 x 60	51°35′04″N 20°05′52″E
Świdwin (Smardzko)	Świdwin		EPSN	Military	116	11/29	Concrete	2500 x 60	53°47′25″N 15°49′39″E
Szczecin-Goleniów	Szczecin	SZZ	EPSC	Civil	47	13/31	Asph/Conc	2500 x 60	53°35′05″N 14°54′08″E
Szczytno-Szymany	Szczytno	SZY	EPSY	Civil	141	02/20	Concrete	2000 x 60	53°28′55″N 20°56′16″E
Szprotawa-Wiechlice (Małomice / Świętoszów)	Szprotawa			Closed (Mil)	135	08/26	Concrete	2500 x 60	51°33′40″N 15°35′19″E
Toruń	Toruń		EPTO	Sport	50	11/29 01/19	Concrete Concrete	1300 x 60 1200 x 60	53°01′50″N 18°32′19″E
Warsaw-Babice (Bemowo)	Warsaw		EPBC	General aviation	107	10R/28L	Concrete	1300 x 90	52°16′09″N 20°54′26″E
Warsaw-Okęcie (F. Chopin)	Warsaw	WAW	EPWA	Civil	110	15/33 11/29	Concrete Concrete	3690 x 60 2800 x 50	52°09′57″N 20°58′02″E
Wicko Morskie (Jarosławiec)	Ustka			Private (Mil)	2	10/28 02/20	Asphalt Asphalt	1100 x30 900 x 30	54°33′12″N 16°37′15″E
Wilcze Laski (Borki)	Okonek			Closed (Mil)	158	10/28	Asphalt	2250 x 30	53°35′43″N 16°43′01″E
Wrocław Airport	Wrocław	WRO	EPWR	Civil	123	12/30	Concrete	2500 x 60	51°06′10″N 16°53′10″E
Żagań-Tomaszowo (Stara Kopernia)	Żagań		EPZN	Closed (Mil)	140	11L/29R 11R/29L	Concrete Concrete	2500 x 60 2000 x 60	51°37′39″N 15°24′30″E
Żerniki (Gądki) (new rwy, not on map)	Poznań			Private	82	06/24	Asphalt	617 x 18	52°19′28″N 17°02′40″E
Zielona Góra-Babimost	Zielona Góra	IEG	EPZG	Civil	59	06/24	Concrete	2500 x 60	52°08′19″N 15°47′55″E
Ziemsko (Oleszno)	Drawsko Pom.		EPDR	Closed (Mil)	115	12/30	Asphalt	2250 x 30	53°28′40″N 15°43′51″E

== See also ==
- List of airports in Poland
- List of airports in Poland with unpaved runways
- List of airports
