= Oława-Stanowice Airport =

Former airport in Oława

- IATA: none; ICAO: none

Summary
- Airport type: Abandoned
- Location: Oława
- Elevation AMSL: 420 ft (130 m)
- Coordinates: 50°58′43″N 17°14′51″E

Map
- Location within Poland Location within Lower Silesian Voivodeship

Runways
Direction	Length		Surface
Direction	ft	m	Surface
13/31	8,202	2,500	Grass

Oława-Stanowice Airport is a former military airport in Poland dating from World War II, situated 12 km northwest of Oława, between the village of Stanowice and the river Oława. It was initially used by the Germans as a Luftwaffe airport under the codename "Kopernikus". Bombers flew from here on missions against Polish cities.

After 1945, it was occupied by the Soviet army. By then, it was used as a spare airport. It was never utilized as a primary airport due to its lack of paved runways. Helicopters and piston driven aircraft were stationed here. Additionally, parachute landings were executed at the airport.

The airport has not been used since the Soviet army departed on 15 August 1992. Attempts to put the estate in working order have been made, such as the localisation of a Bahlsen factory. A string of shelters for flood victims has been erected on the grounds.

The airport had a 13/31 grass runway measuring 2,500 x 60 m (elevation 128 m) and is often referred to as Oława-Marcinkowice after a nearby village.

== See also ==
- List of airports
- Airports in Poland with paved runways
- Airports in Poland with unpaved runways
