= List of Mikoyan MiG-29 operators =

In active service In active reserve Former operator Privately owned

This is a list of Mikoyan MiG-29 operators.

== Current operators ==
Current operators according to geographical area.

== Europe ==
=== Belarus ===
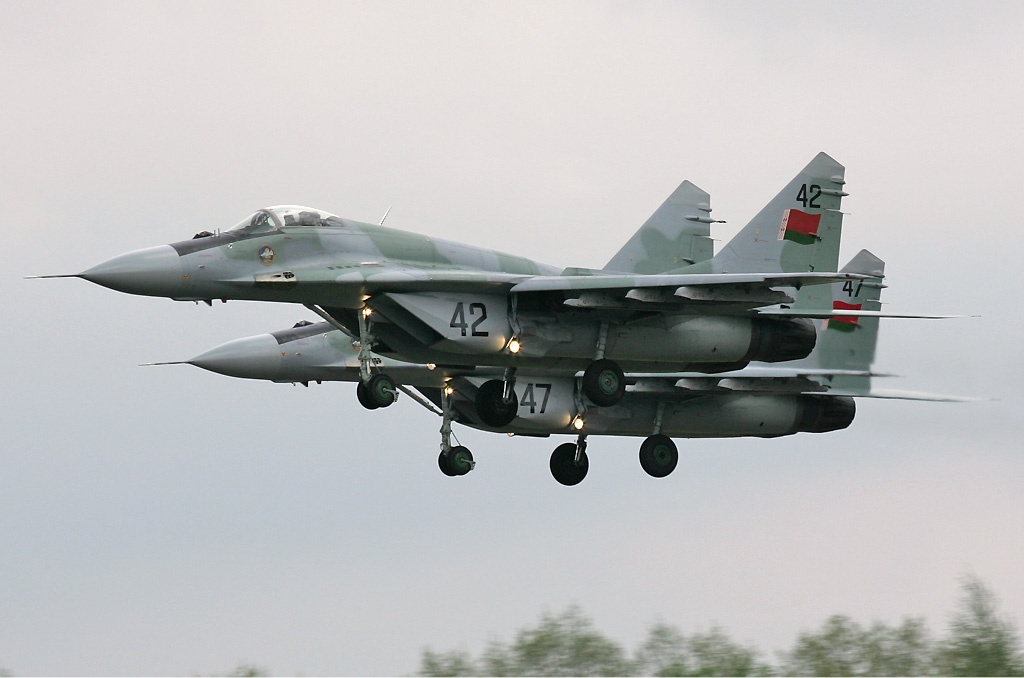
Two Belarusian Air Force MiG-29s

Belarus had 34 MiG-29 in service as of 2022.

Belarusian Air Force

=== Bulgaria ===
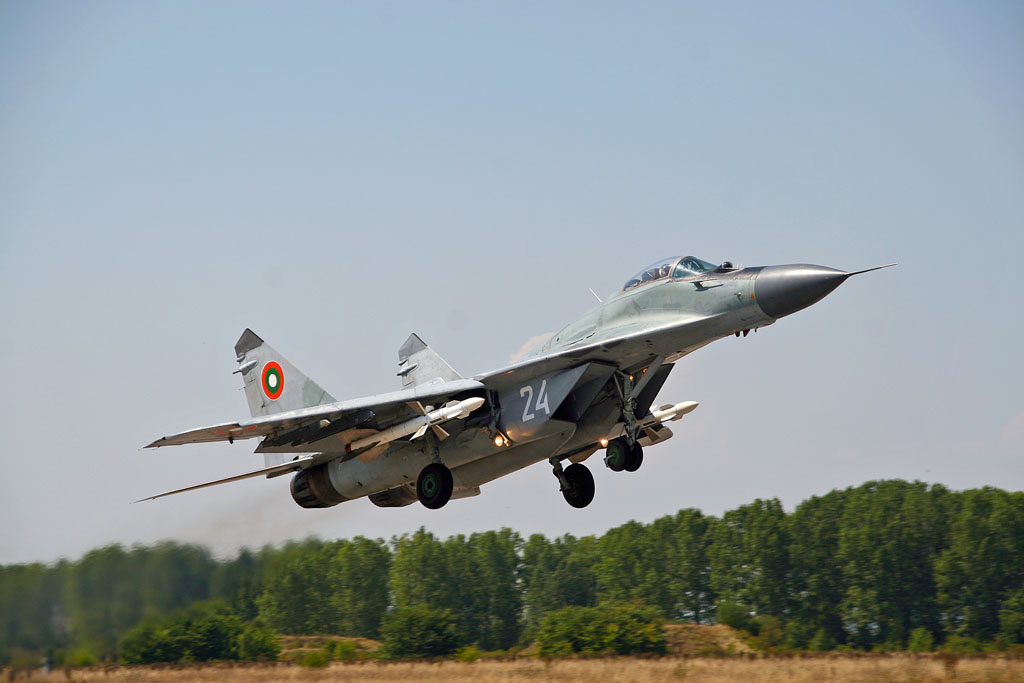
Bulgarian MiG-29 with pair of R-27R (AA-10 Alamo) air-to-air missiles

Bulgaria had 11 MiG-29s and 3 MiG-29UB used for conversion training in inventory as of 2025. Bulgaria bought 15 MiG-29, before including 2 MiG-29UB. Also 4 MiG-29 in reserve. One aircraft disassembled in Bulgarian military factory. One MiG-29A crashed in 1994 and one MiG-29UB in 2004. They are scheduled to be replaced by F-16s by 2024.

Bulgarian Air Force

- 2/3 Iztrebitelna Avio Eskadrila based at Graf Ignatievo operates MiG-29A and MiG-29UB (9.51).

=== Poland ===
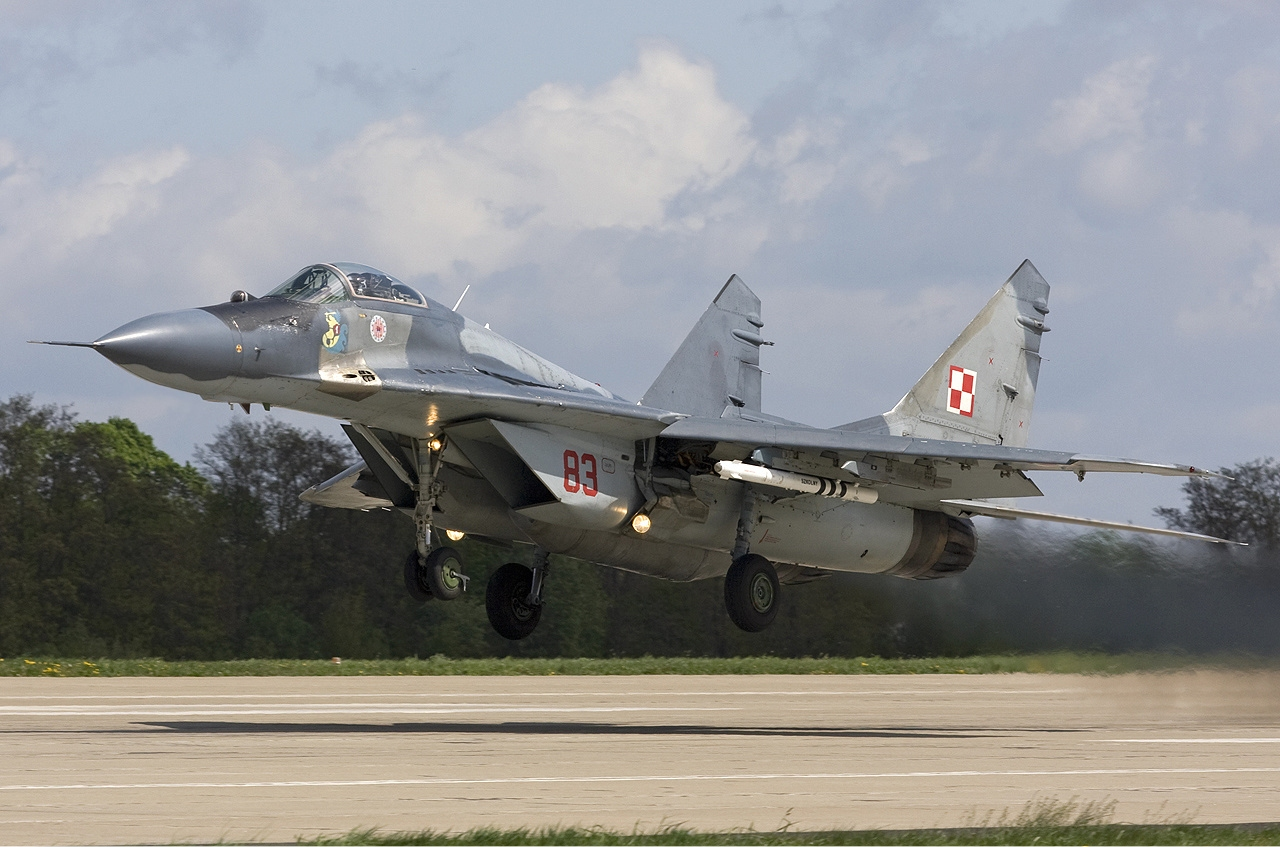
Polish MiG-29A

Poland had 11 MiG-29s and 3 MiG-29UB used for conversion training in service as of 2025. Poland bought 12 aircraft (nine MiG-29 9.12A and three MiG-29UB 9.51) from the Soviet Union between 1989 and 1990. Next ten ex-Czech aircraft (nine MiG-29A and one MiG-29UB) were exchanged with Czech Republic for 11 Polish PZL W-3 Sokół helicopters in 1996. Last 22 were handed over by Germany in 2003. In December 2017 a MiG-29A #67 from 23rd Air Base in Mińsk Mazowiecki crashed on approach. The pilot survived. In July 2018 a MiG-29A #4103 from 22nd Air Base in Malbork crashed near Elbląg during night flight. The pilot died after ejecting. In total Poland had 44 aircraft (36 MiG-29A and eight MiG-29UB) but only 30 aircraft were operational in two units.

Between 2001 and 2005 all aircraft were upgraded with domestic SC-10D2 Supraśl IFF, Rockwell Collins AN/ARN-153 (TCN 500) TACAN and ANV-241 MMR VOR/ILS receivers, Trimble 2101AP civilian GPS receiver, Thomson-CSF SB-14 radar warning receiver, RS 6113-2 VHF/UHF radio with R-862 control panel and new anti-collision lights. Their service life was extended up to 4000 flight hour or until 2028. In 2011-2014 period 16 aircraft from the 23rd Air Base (former 1. elt) received second modernization package, consisting of MFCD 5"x7" multi-function display, MDP mission computer, Up-Front Control Panel (UFCP), Honeywell Enhanced GPS Inertial navigation system (EGI) with SAASM, MIL-STD-1553B data bus and Rockwell Collins AN/ARC-210 (Talon RT-8200) VHF/UHF radio, exploitation was changed from flight hours to be based on technical status. All the units are to be replaced by F-35 Lightning II.

In March 2022, Poland sought to transfer all of its MiG-29 aircraft to Ukraine, following the Russian invasion of Ukraine. However, the transfer was opposed by Poland's partners in other NATO countries, including the United States. Opposition relented in 2023 and 10 were transferred to Ukraine.

Polish Air Force

- 23rd Air Base in Mińsk Mazowiecki operates MiG-29 (9.12A) and MiG-29UB (9.51) from 2011.
  - 1. Pułk Lotnictwa Myśliwskiego based at Mińsk Mazowiecki operated MiG-29 (9.12A) and MiG-29UB (9.51) between 1989 and 2000. Unit was reorganized to 1. ELT.
  - 1. eskadra lotnictwa taktycznego based at Mińsk Mazowiecki operated MiG-29 (9.12A) and MiG-29UB (9.51) between 2001 and 2010. Unit was reorganized to 23rd Air Base.
- 22nd Air Base in Malbork operates MiG-29 (9.12A) and MiG-29UB (9.51) from 2011.
  - 41. eskadra lotnictwa taktycznego based at Malbork operated MiG-29 (9.12A) and MiG-29UB (9.51) between 2005 and 2010. Unit was reorganized to 22rd Air Base.

=== Russia ===
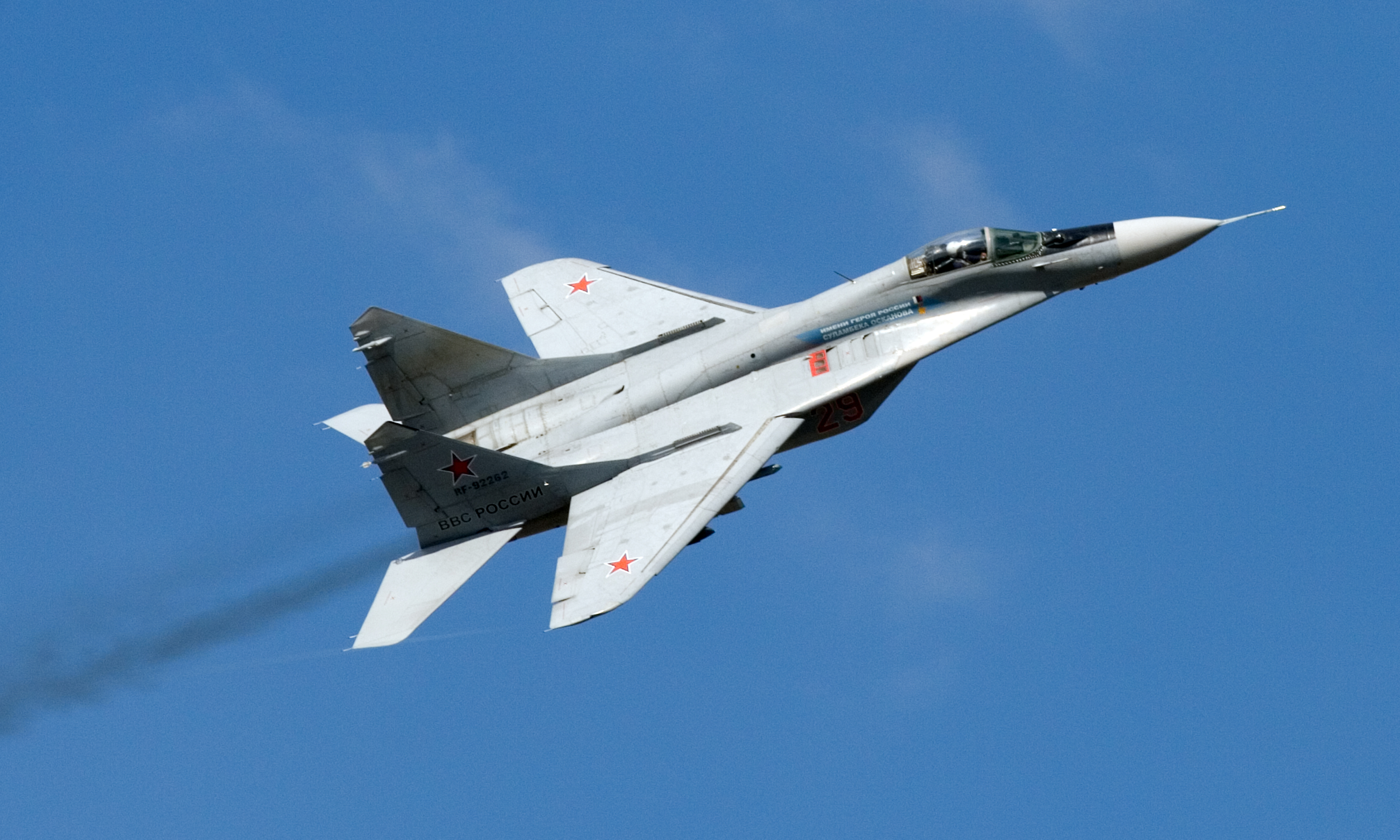
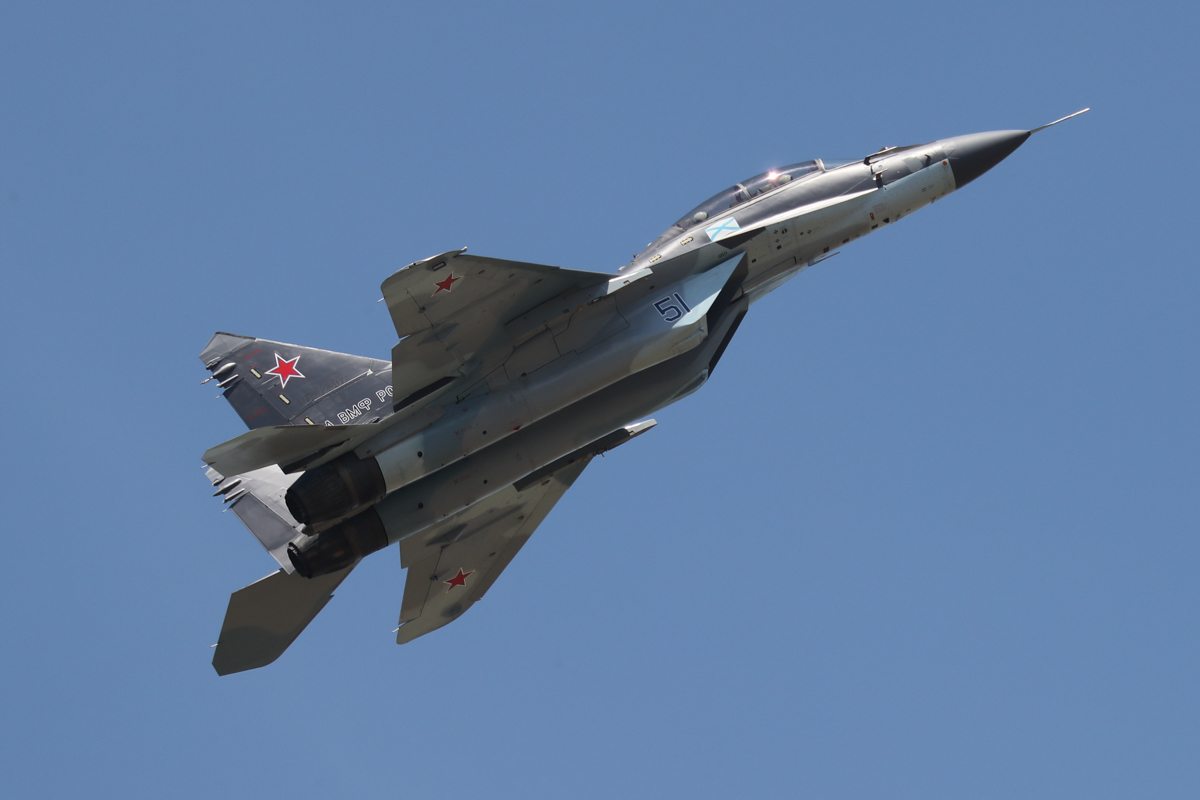
MiG-29s of the Russian Air Force (left) and Russian Navy (right).

The Russian Aerospace Forces had 253 MiG-29s and MiG-35s in service as of 2024, while the Russian Naval Aviation had 22 MiG-29s in service as of 2024. Russia had 260 MiG-29s in inventory as of 2021. Russian Aerospace Forces

- Russian Air Force
  - 14th Fighter Aviation Regiment - Kursk
  - 200th Training Air Base - Armavir
  - 19th Fighter Aviation Regiment - Millerovo
  - 102nd Military Base - Gyumri

Russian Naval Aviation

- 100th Shipborne Fighter Aviation Regiment

=== Serbia ===
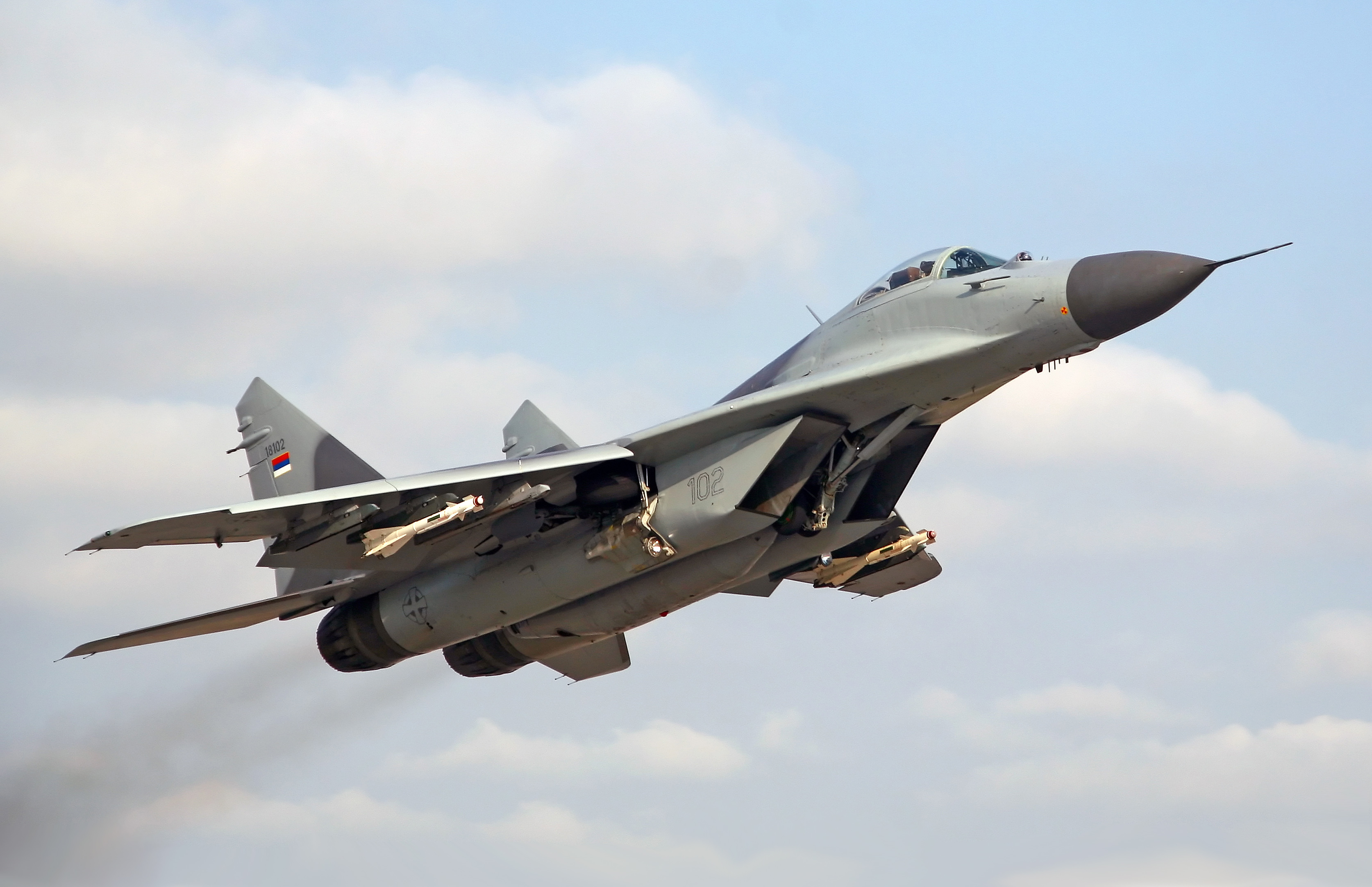
Serbian MiG-29 with a pair of R-60 air-to-air missiles

Serbia had 13 MiG-29s in service as of 2022. Serbia inherited four MiG-29B and one MiG-29UB from Yugoslavia. Refurbished and returned to service in 2009. One MiG-29 crashed in 2009. By 2011, only 3 MiG-29s (2 single seaters and 1 dual seater) were operational. In 2017, the Serbian government signed an agreement with their Russian counterparts for 4 MiG-29 and 2 MiG-29UB that were modernized. Belarus also donated 4 aircraft with a more modest modernization package. While the aircraft were donated, modernization was paid for by Serbia. Deliveries of all 10 aircraft were completed in 2021, bringing the total number to 14.

Serbian Air Force

- 101st squadron based at 204th Air Base (Batajnica Airbase) operates MiG-29 (9.12B) and MiG-29UB (9.51).

=== Ukraine ===
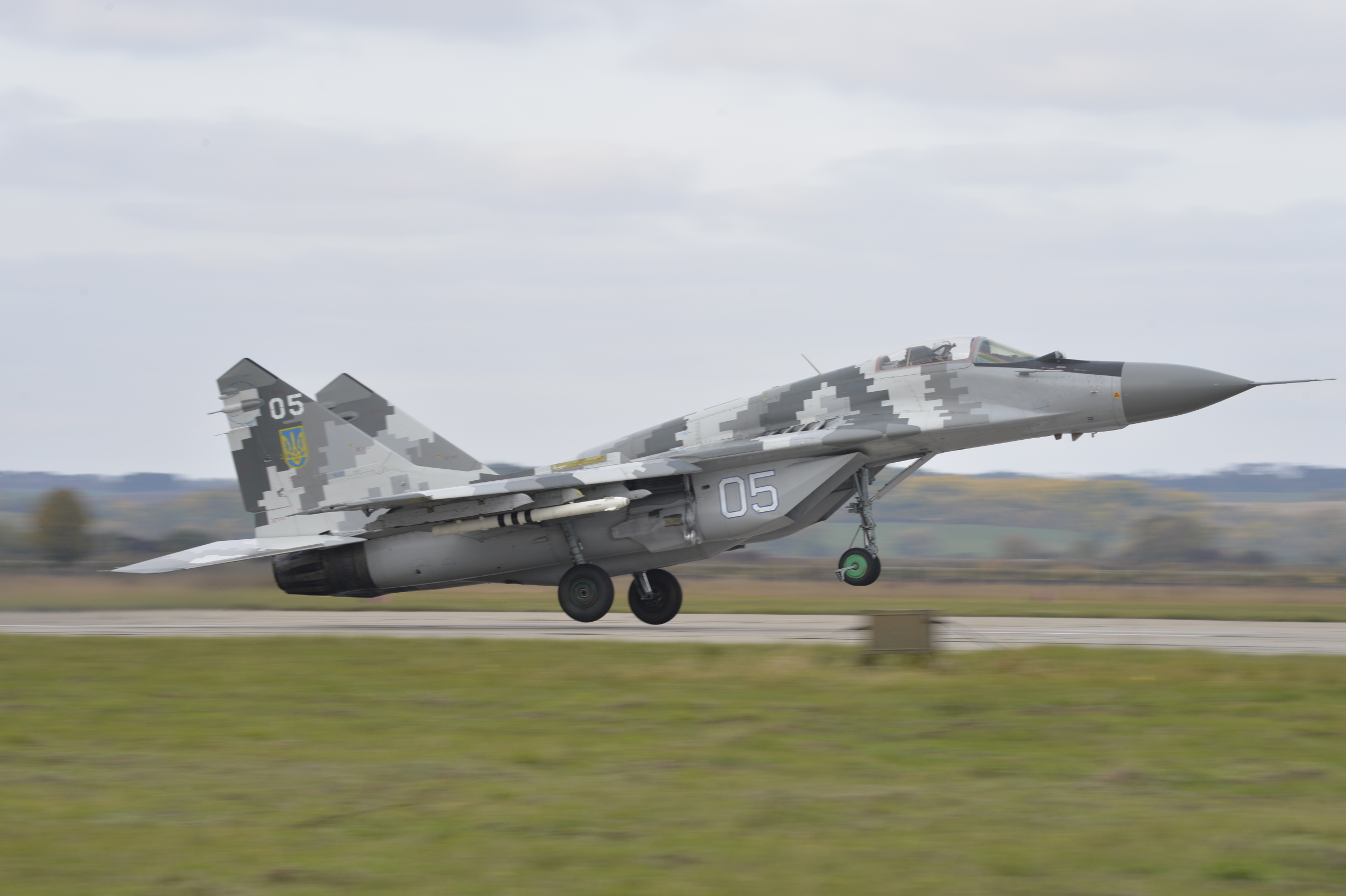
A Ukrainian Air Force MiG-29

Ukraine had 51 MiG-29s in service as of 2022. Ukraine inherited hundreds of MiG-29s at the dissolution of the USSR. 37-70 MiG-29s were still in use as of March 2019

Ukrainian Air Force

- 204th Fighter Aviation Brigade
- 9th Fighter Aviation Brigade
- 114th Fighter Aviation Brigade
- 40th Fighter Aviation Brigade

== Asia ==
=== Bangladesh ===
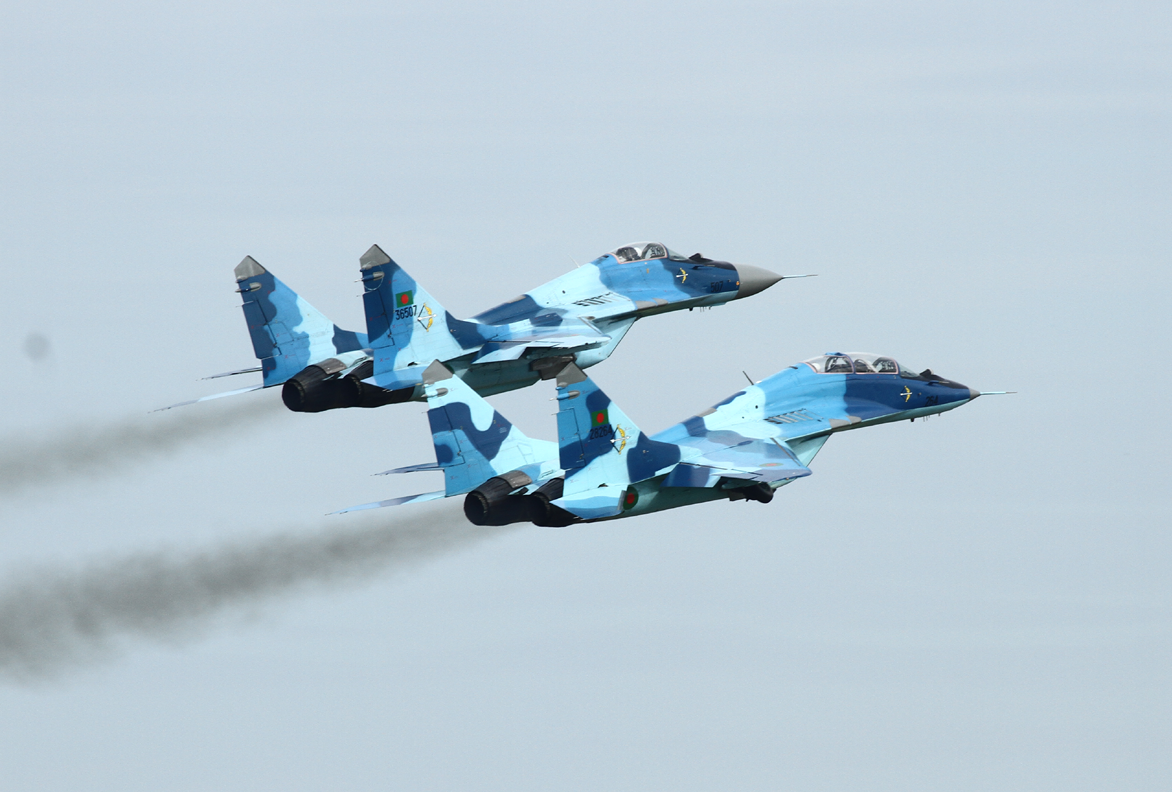
Bangladesh Air Force MiG-29B and MiG-29UB inflight

Bangladesh had 8 MiG-29s in service as of 2022. The aircraft in operation are the early export models, the MiG-29 (9.12B) and MiG-29UB (9.51). Initially, a total of 16 MiG-29s (10 MiG-29 (9.12B) and 6 MiG-29UB (9.51)) were planned to be ordered, roughly enough for one squadron, but for some reason part of the procurement was canceled, and only 6 MiG-29 (9.12B) and 2 MiG-29UB (9.51) were deployed. The remaining four MiG-29s (9.12B) and four MiG-29UBs (9.51) are believed to have remained in the Soviet Union and later been exported.

Bangladesh Air Force

- 8th Squadron based at Kurmitola operates 6 upgraded MiG-29B(9.12B) and 2 MiG-29UB (9.51).

=== India ===
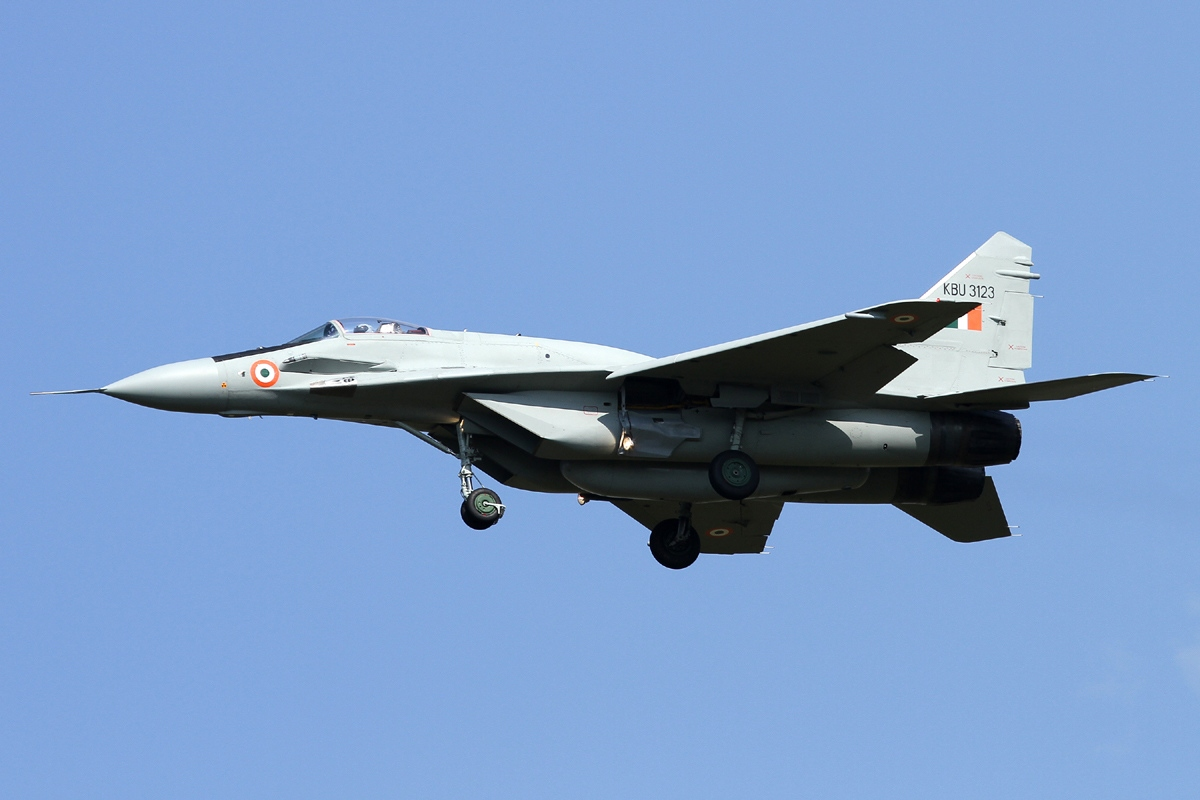
Indian Air Force MiG-29UPG

India had 115 MiG-29s in service as of 2022, 75 in the Indian Air Force and 40 in the Indian Navy. In July 2020 the Indian Air Force got two MiG-29UPG which were upgraded from the last two remaining legacy MiG-29s, taking the number of aircraft from 65 to 67. In January 2021, the Indian Ministry of Defense finally approved the upgrading of existing aircraft to UPG2 Standard with AESA radar, more advanced electronic warfare suites and weapons. 21 additional aircraft were purchased from Russia, to be constructed from the airframes mothballed in the late 1980s and upgraded with "the latest avionics and electronic warfare suites." The request for a proposal to buy two more MiG-29s airframes from Malaysia was made in February 2021. IAF want to take the total existing Mig-29UPG numbers from 67 to 90, with 5 operational squadrons until 2022 March–April. The final purchase order of 21 more aircraft was placed in February 2021.

In January 2004, twelve MiG-29Ks and four MiG-29KUBs were ordered for the Indian Naval Air Arm to operate from INS Vikramaditya. In September 2008, it was reported that India intended to buy 30 more Mig-29Ks.

Indian Air Force

- 28 Squadron (First Supersonics) – based at AFS Adampur
- 47 Squadron (Black Archers) – based at AFS Adampur
- 223 Squadron (Tridents) – based at AFS Srinagar

Indian Naval Air Arm

- INAS 300 (The White Tigers) – based at INS Hansa
- INAS 303 (The Black Panthers) – based at INS Hansa

=== Mongolia ===
In 2019, Russia donated two MiG-29UB to Mongolia and Mongolian sources reported the delivery of four or five in 2021. They are still in service as of 2022.

Mongolian Air Force

=== Myanmar ===
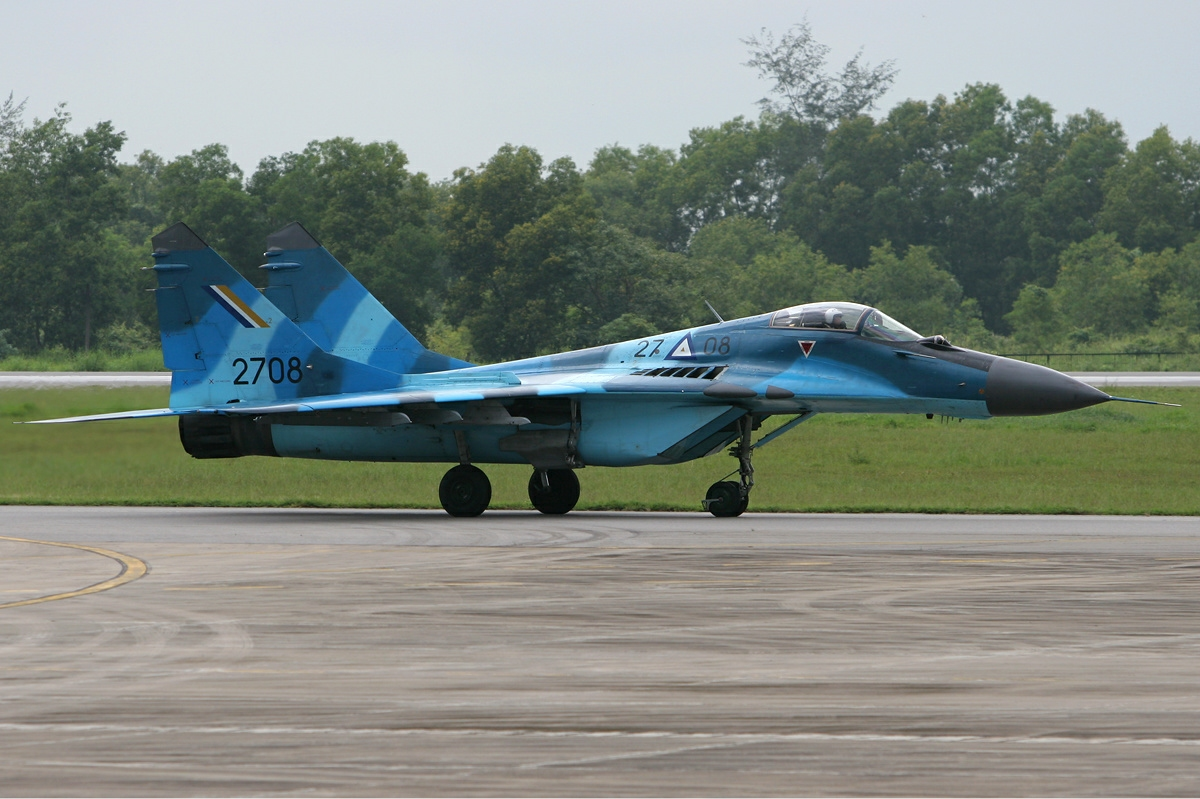
Myanmar Air Force MiG-29B

Myanmar had 36 MiG-29s in service as of 2022 with 31 of them are MiG-29SM/SEs (9.13M and 9.13) and 5 MiG-29UBs (9.51 trainer version).

Myanmar Air Force

=== North Korea ===
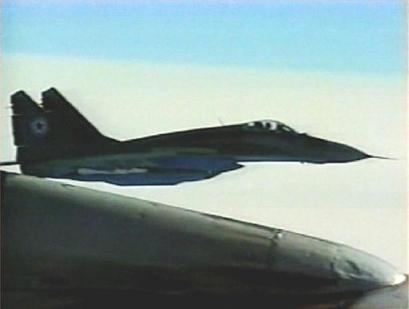
A North Korean MiG-29S, 2003

North Korea had 35 MiG-29(9-13)s in service as of 2022. Korean People's Air Force

- 57th Air Regiment based at Sunchon

=== Turkmenistan ===
Turkmenistan had 24 MiG-29s in service as of 2022. Originally from the 1521st Detachment at the Maryy-1 Airbase (until their disbandment in 1993), they were then re-organized into the 67th Composite Air Regiment at the Maryy-2 Airbase and are a mix of MiG-29As, MiG-29Cs and include two UB trainers. Turkmen Air Force

=== Uzbekistan ===
Uzbekistan had 38 MiG-29s in service as of 2022.

Uzbekistan Air and Air Defence Forces

== Africa ==
=== Algeria ===
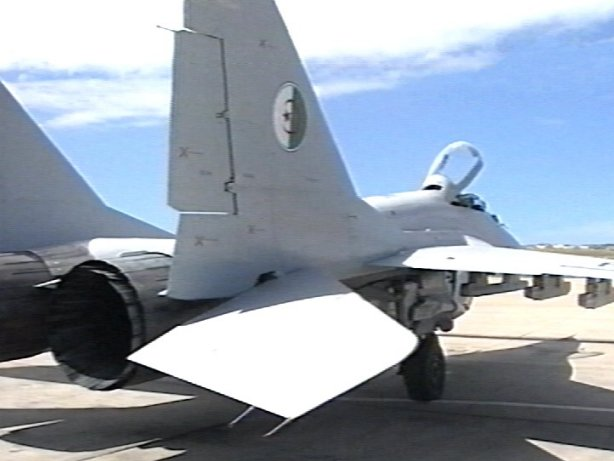
Algerian Air Force MiG-29

Algeria had 36 MiG-29s in service as of 2023, of which 1 was a MIG29UB (operational since 1998) used for conversion training, 21 MiG-29Ss (operational since 1999) and 14 MIG29M/M2 (operational since 2020). Algeria has ordered 50 MiG-29Ss and 8 MiG-29UBs in total between 1998 and 2005. 36 MiG-29 9.19 were to be delivered between 2007 and 2008. However, in March 2008, in an unprecedented move, Algeria decided to return 15 of the MiG-29 9.19 aircraft delivered in 2006–07 to Russia, citing the "inferior quality" of certain components and units. Following this the MiG-29SMT has been cancelled with SU-30MKA instead being ordered. This also cancelled the fact that MIG29Ss were going to be upgraded to 9.19 standard and UB to UBT standards.

Algerian Air Force

- 113e Escadron de Chasse based at Tindouf operates MiG-29S
- 143e Escadron de Chasse based at Ouargla operates MiG-29S and MiG-29UB (9.51)
- 153e Escadron de Chasse based at Béchar-Oukda/Leger operates MiG-29S .
- 193e Escadron de Chasse based at Bou Sfer operates MiG-29S, MIG-29M/M2 and MiG-29UB (9.51)

=== Sudan ===
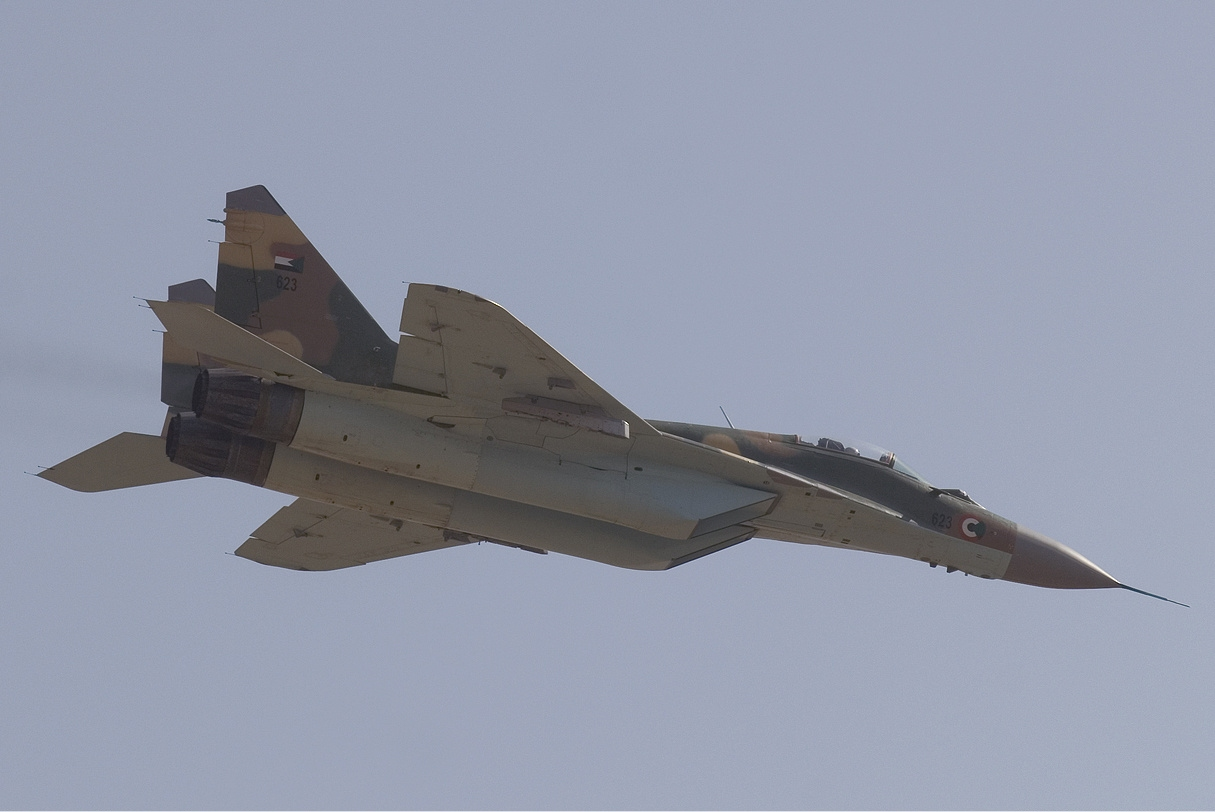
Sudan Air Force Mikoyan-Gurevich MiG-29SE

Sudan had 11 MiG-29s in service as of 2022. According to Sudanese Defense Minister Abdul Rahim Mohammed Hussein, Sudan bought 12 MiG-29 from Russia in 2004 (despite the UN arms embargo) and another 12 in 2008 (probable Russian surplus via Belarus). One MiG-29 was shot down in May 2008 by heavy machine gun fire during a CAS mission.

Sudanese Air Force

== Middle East ==
=== Azerbaijan ===
As of 2024, the Azerbaijani Air Forces operate 12 single seat, and 3 twin seat MiG-29s

Azerbaijan Air Force

=== Egypt ===
Egypt had 44 MiG-29s in service as of 2022.

Egyptian Air Force

=== Iran ===
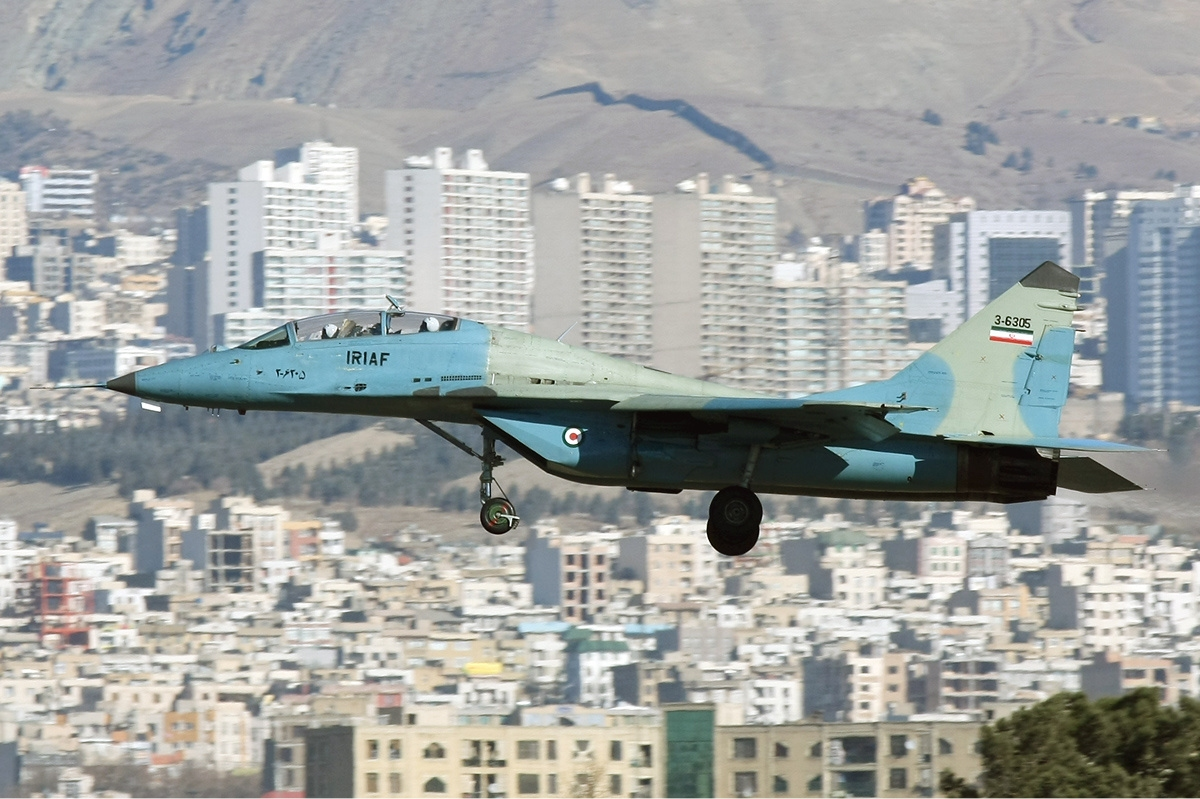
A MiG-29UB of the Islamic Republic of Iran Air Force

Iran had 19 MiG-29s in service as of 2023. In 1989, Iran purchased 20 MiG-29(9.12B) and 4 MiG-29UB(9.51) from the Soviet Union. It also received 4 Iraqi MiG-29s (3 MiG-29(9.12B) and 1 MiG-29UB(9.51)) that had fled to Iran during the 1991 Gulf War. Eventually the number grew to 24 MiG-29(9.12B) and 5 MiG-29UB(9.51). One MiG-29(9.12B) was lost in a crash in 2018.

Islamic Republic of Iran Air Force

- 11th TFS based at Tehran Mehrabad International Airport operates MiG-29 (9.12B) and MiG-29UB (9.51).
- 23rd TFS based at Shaheed Fakhouri Air Base in Tabriz operates MiG-29 (9.12B) and MiG-29UB (9.51).

=== Yemen ===
Yemen had 23 MiG-29s in service as of 2022. Since 2005 the standard was MiG-29SMT, replacing SE version (14 SE and UB delivered in 2001, after sent to MiG to be updated). Together with those 14 aircraft updated, RSK-MiG sold 6 new examples. Later there was eventually another batch delivered. Operational status is unknown due to civil war and foreign intervention.

Yemeni Air Force

== Latin America ==
=== Peru ===
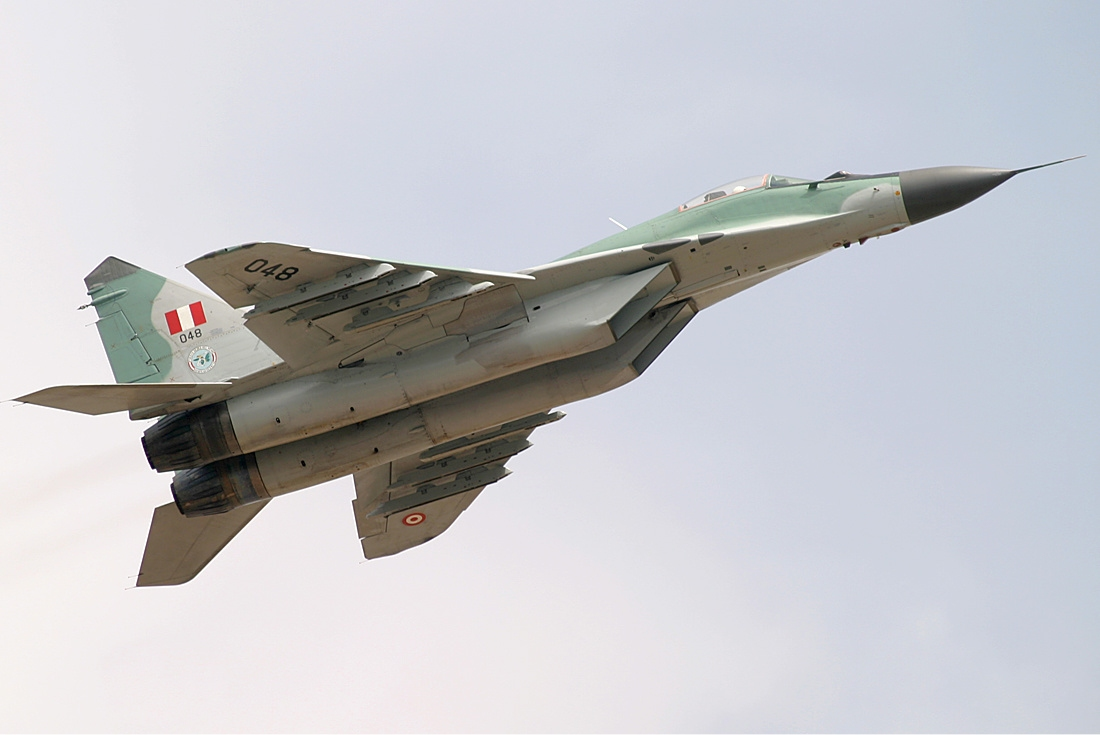
Peruvian Air Force MiG-29

Peru had 8 MiG-29s in service as of 2022. Peru acquired 18 aircraft from Belarus in 1996, 16 MiG-29 (9.13) and 2 MiG-29UB (9.51) (one purchased new by Belarus to Russia to replace the unit rejected by the Peruvian Air Force for technical issues). Two aircraft were lost in accidents in 1997 and 2001 respectively. Three additional MiG-29SE (9.13SE) were purchased from Russia in 1998 to replace the lost aircraft.

On 12 August 2008 a contract of US$106 million was signed with RAC MiG for a custom-made SM-based upgrade of eight MiG-29 called MiG-29SMP. Four MiG-29SMP (three single-seaters and one twin-seater) were displayed in maneuvers during the Peruvian Air Force anniversary celebrations on 23 July 2012.

Peruvian Air Force

- Escuadrón Aéreo Nº 612 based at Chiclayo operates MiG-29/MiG-29SE/MiG-29SMP (9.13/9.13SE) and MiG-29UBP (9.51).

== North America ==
=== United States ===
The United States bought 21 aircraft from Moldova. Different private owned companies and individuals bought MiG-29s from former USSR republics. One such individual is Jared Isaacman, the current administrator of NASA and the founder of the aviation company Draken International.

== Former operators ==
=== Cuba ===
In 2022, Cuba has five MiG-29s in operation. Deliveries began in October 1989, and assembled aircraft were test-flying in 1990. The Cuban Air Force wanted a modern aircraft to replace the radar-less MiG-17AS and MiG-21F-13, and chose the MiG-29, a fourth-generation fighter. Initially, it was planned to acquire up to 45 MiG-29s (42 MiG-29 (9.12B) and 3 MiG-29UB (9.51)). This would have allowed for the formation of an air regiment consisting of 3 squadrons of 14 fighters and 1 flight group of 3 trainers. However, due to the collapse of the Soviet Union in 1991, the initial deliveries consisted of only 12 MiG-29 (9.12B) and 2 MiG-29UB (9.51).After that, the Russian Federation fell into financial difficulties after the collapse of the Soviet Union. Russia needed foreign currency, so it is said that the remaining 31 aircraft were sent by 2000. The serial numbers range from 900 to 945. Although all were eventually received, the operational rate gradually decreased due to parts shortages caused by economic sanctions and financial difficulties, and the number of aircraft that could fly decreased.

In February 1996, the MiG-29UB, together with a MiG-23ML, pursued and shot down an invading American Cessna 337 Skymaster reconnaissance aircraft. The MiG-29UB's fate was soon to be tragic. The MiG-29UBs deployed to the Air Force were "MiG-29UB s/n:900", "MiG-29UB s/n:901" and "MiG-29UB s/n:917". Around 2001, "s/n:917" was renamed to "900" (details unknown) and used for parts before being stored in a hangar at the base. In 2003, "s/n:900" was repainted to "901", and "s/n:902" was later donated to the museum. When "901 (formerly 900)" was donated to the museum in 2003, it was painted in a pale green and grey camouflage, but in 2007 it was repainted in a pale blue and light blue reminiscent of Marine Corps camouflage. It was then repainted for ground operations, had its canopy replaced, and returned to the RAF by 2010, likely with some assistance from Russia. "s/n 902" was then rewritten to "900", repainted grey, and preserved. However, Russian assistance continued, and "900 (formerly 917)", which was initially abandoned, was repaired and essentially brought back to life. In addition, the two MiG-29UBs on display at the museum are also scheduled to be brought back to life after some maintenance. Eventually, the Air Force was reduced to two MiG-29s (9.12B) and three MiG-29UBs (9.51), and they are still in operation as a handful of fourth-generation aircraft. The remaining aircraft are said to be stored and ready to be deployed in battle but as of 2026, none are operational and all are in storage.

Cuban Air Force

MiG-29(9.12B)×42 s/n:903～911、s/n:918～945(s/n:910 and s/n:911 are in operation.)
MiG-29UB(9.51)×3 s/n:900、s/n:901、s/n:917

=== Czechoslovakia ===
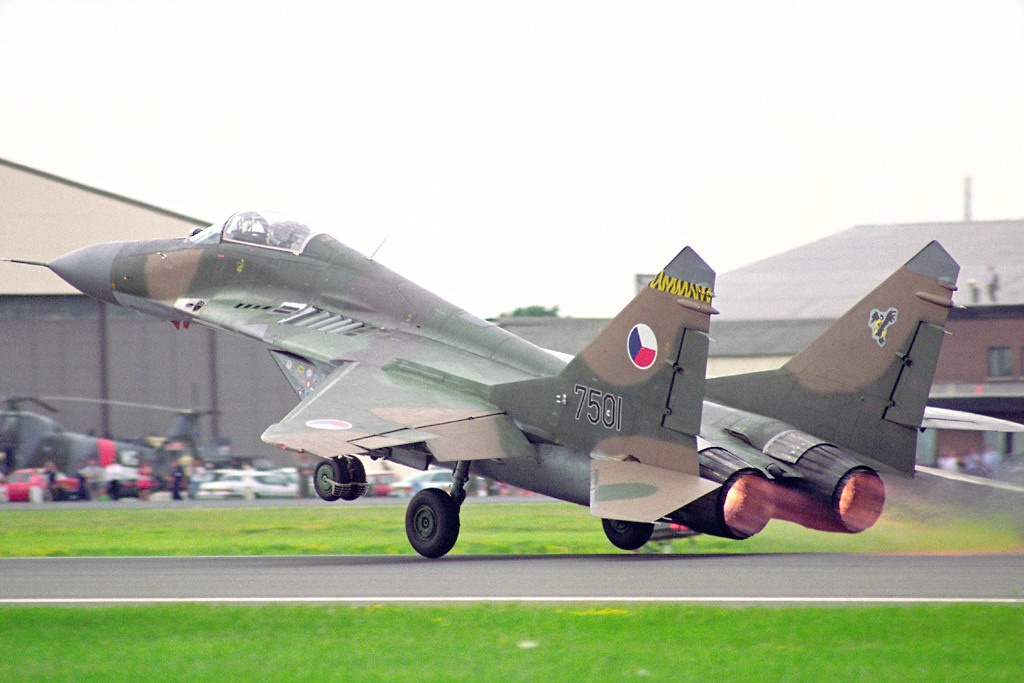
Czechoslovak MiG-29A in 1991

Czechoslovakia had 18 MiG-29A and 2 MiG-29UB from 1989. All were passed on (in 1:1 ratio) to the Czech Republic and Slovakia.

Czechoslovak Air Force

=== Czech Republic ===
The Czech Republic inherited 9 MiG-29A and 1 MiG-29UB from Czechoslovakia. The aircraft are no longer in service, having been exchanged with Poland for 11 PZL W-3 Sokół helicopters in 1996.

Czech Air Force

=== East Germany ===
East Germany received 24 aircraft delivered in 1988–1989, including 4 MiG-29UBs. They were based at Preschen. Upon the German Reunification in 1990 all were passed to the West German Air Force.

Air Forces of the National People's Army

=== Eritrea ===
Eritrea received 8 aircraft in 1998, Eritrea had 7 MiG-29s in service as of 2022. As of 2026 however, none were operational.

Eritrean Air Force

=== Germany ===
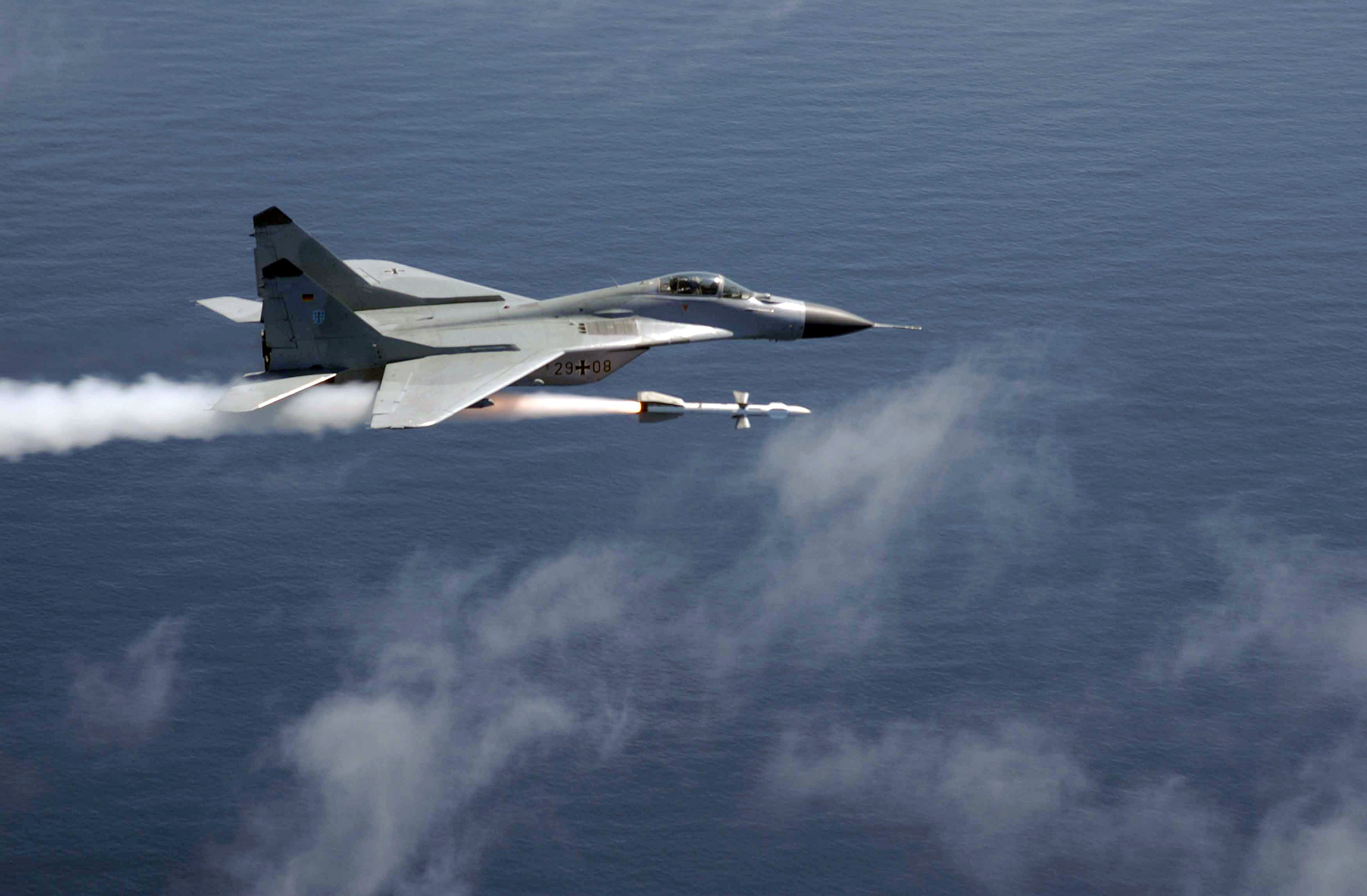
A German MiG-29 fires an AA-10 air-to-air missile

Germany inherited 24 aircraft from East Germany in 1990 and upgraded them to NATO compatibility. One was lost, and one was kept for display when the remaining 22 were transferred to Poland in 2003, following the arrival of the Eurofighter Typhoon which replaced them.

German Air Force

- JG73 "Steinhoff" based at Laage operated MiG-29 (9.12A) and MiG-29UB (9.51) under local designation MiG-29G.

=== Hungary ===
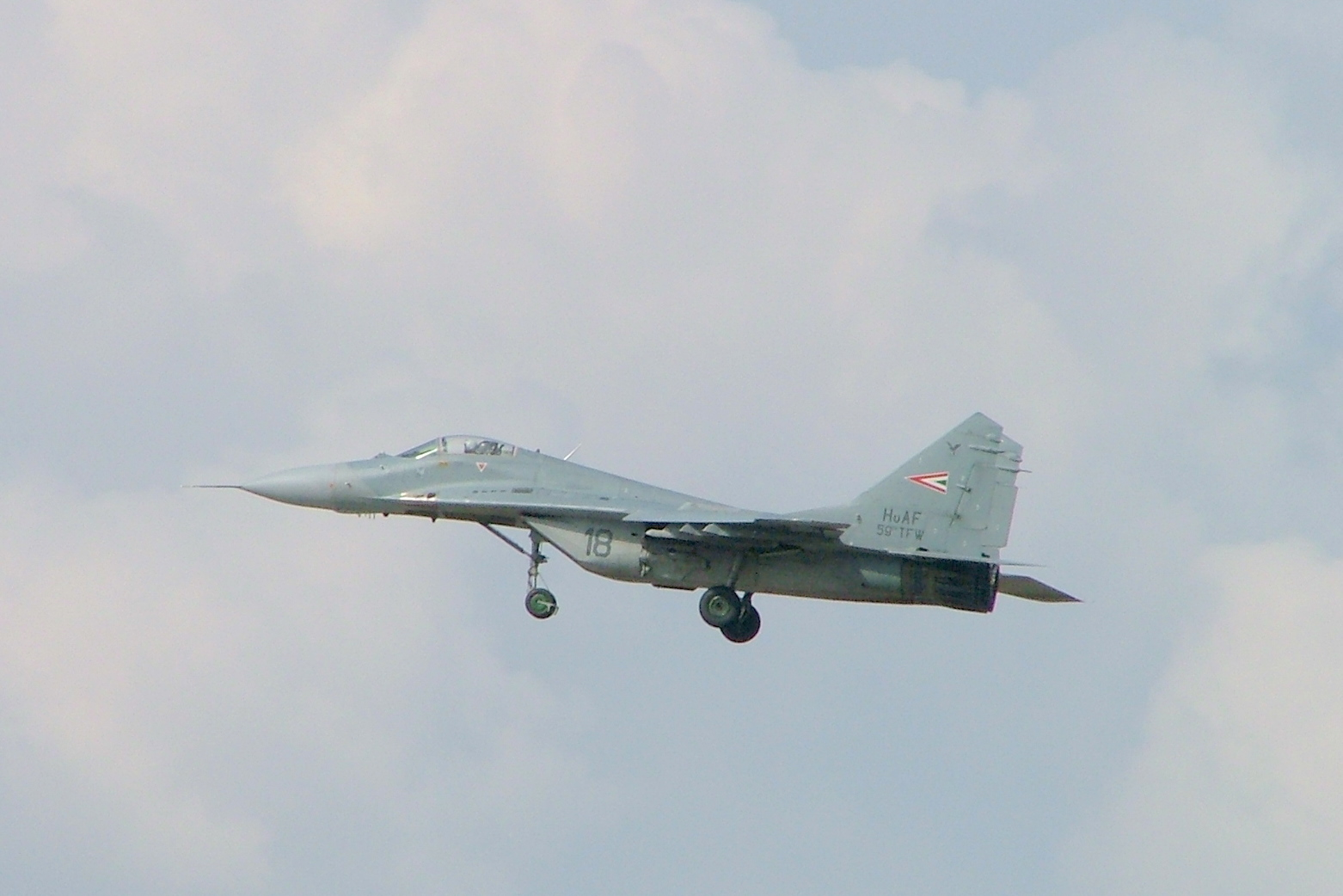
MiG-29B of the Hungarian Air Force

Hungary received 28 MIG-29s in 1993 as debt compensation from Russia. The last of them was retired in December, 2010. Eight of them were put up for sale with the bidding starting at US$18 Million. The bidders had to submit offers by 15 September 2011

Hungarian Air Force

- 2. Vadászrepülö Század was based at Kecskemét Air Base was operating MiG-29 (9.12A) and MiG-29UB (9.51).
- 59th Wing, Dongó Squadron was based at Kecskemét Air Base was operating MiG-29 (9.12A) and MiG-29UB (9.51).

=== Iraq ===
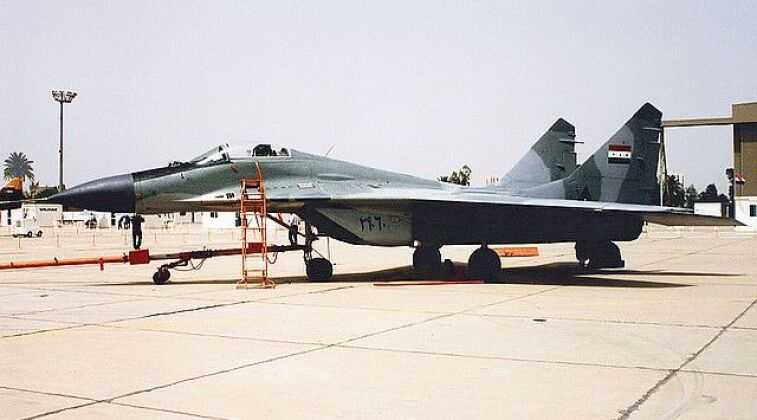
Iraqi Air Force MiG-29(9.12B)

Iraq received 50 aircraft.42 fighter versions and 6 trainer versions. Initially, Iraq planned to purchase a total of 130 MiG-29s (the exact breakdown is unknown, but perhaps 120 fighter aircraft and 10 trainer aircraft?), which would have been a huge deal with 10 squadrons and one training squadron if it had been realized, but due to rising oil prices and sanctions following the invasion of Kuwait, the plan was halted midway and only 42 MiG-29s (9.12B) and 8 MiG-29UB (9.51) were delivered. The remaining 78 fighter aircraft and 2 trainer aircraft were resold to various friendly countries of the Soviet Union.(reference)16 were destroyed in Gulf War, 4(9.12B×3、9.51×1) evacuated to Iran. Remaining squadron (with 22 aircraft) withdrawn from service in 1995～2003 due to engine TBO expiry.

Iraqi Air Force

=== Israeli ===
Two aircraft, borrowed from an undisclosed European air force (according to online images aircraft from the Polish Air Force were used) for evaluation. Flown by 601 Squadron, the Israeli Air Force's flight test center.

Israeli Air Force

=== Kazakhstan ===
Kazakhstan had 23 MiG-29s in service as of 2023. These were retired in late 2023, put up for auction in October 2023, and sold to the US in April 2024. It is speculated that these will be transferred to Ukraine for use as spare part sources or decoys.

Kazakh Air Defense Forces

=== Malaysia ===
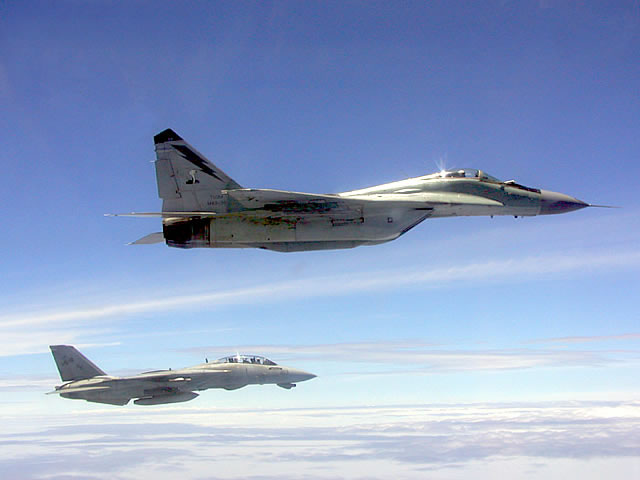
A Malaysian MiG-29 in formation with a U.S. Navy F-14 Tomcat

Malaysia received 16 MiG-29N and 2 MiG-29UB. Two were lost to separate crashes in 1998 and 2004, and six were retired in 2010 to save on maintenance costs. The remaining ten MiG-29 aircraft were retired in 2017.

Royal Malaysian Air Force

- 19 Sqn Cobra based at RMAF Kuantan formerly operated single seater MiG-29N (9.12SD) and two seater trainers MiG-29UB (9.51) under local designation (MiG-29N).

=== Moldova ===
Moldova had 34 aircraft inherited from USSR. 6 of them were sold to Yemen, 21 bought by USA, 1 MiG-29S sold to Romania. Last 6 remaining MiG-29S were overhauled in Ukraine recently. Yemen returned 6 MiG-29S.The remaining Moldovan MiGs are grounded due to lack of spare parts.

Moldovan Air Force

=== Romania ===
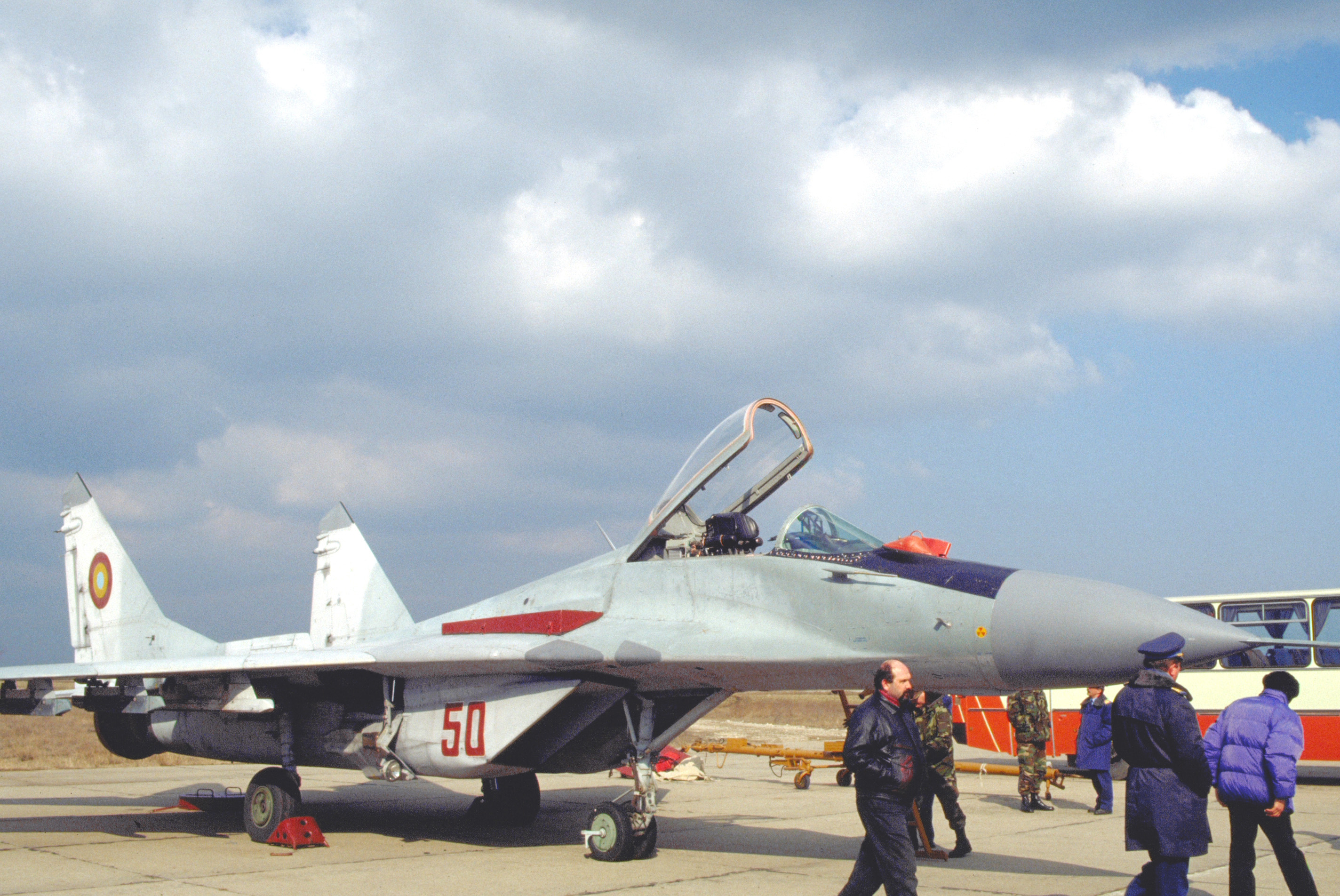
Romanian Air Force MiG-29A

Romania received 20 MiG-29A delivered from USSR starting in 1989 plus 1 MiG-29S from Moldova. Romanian aircraft were retired in 2003 after funding was cut for upgrade programme.

Romanian Air Force

=== Slovakia ===
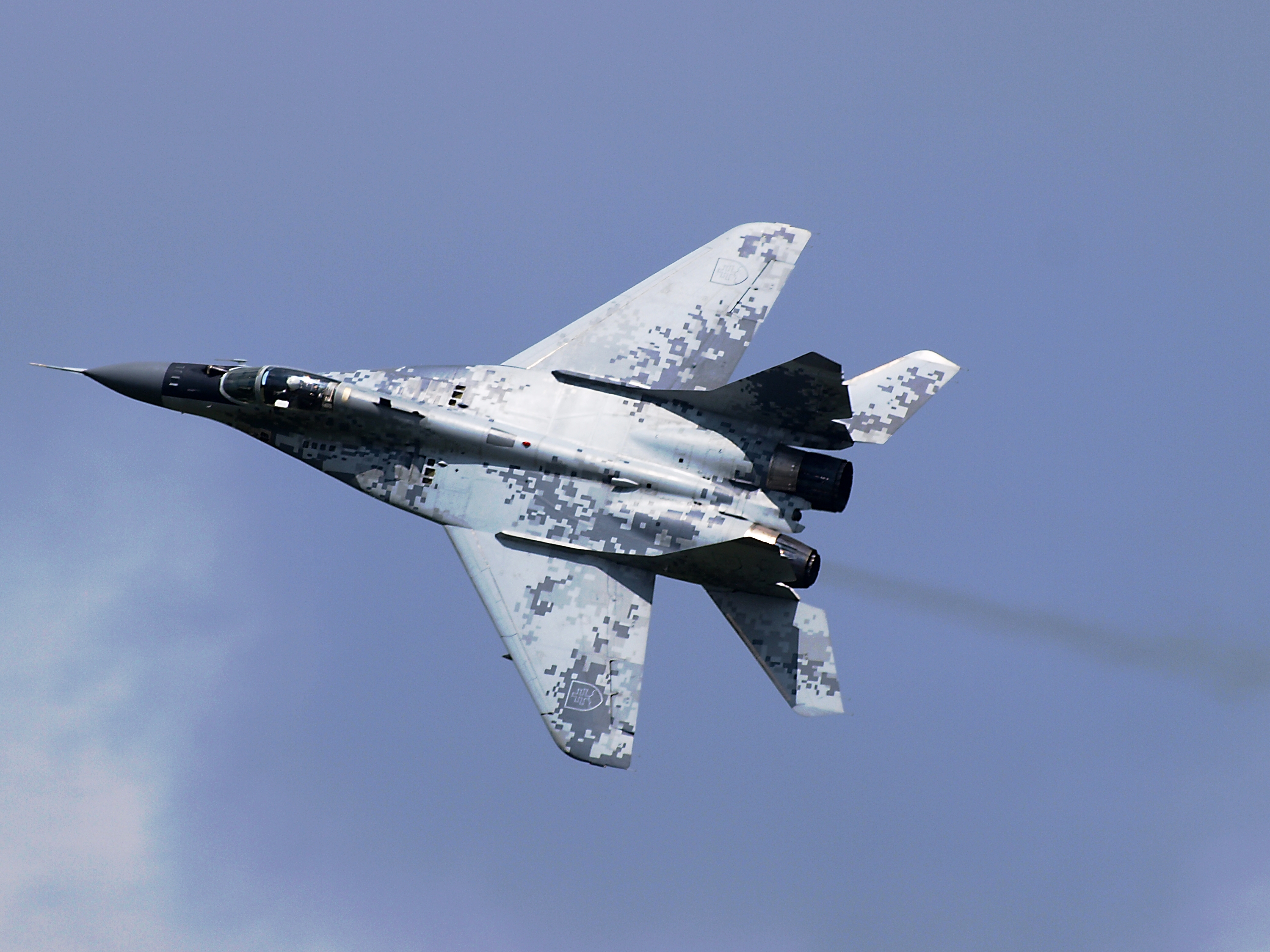
Slovak MiG-29AS

Slovakia had 11 MiG-29s in service as of 2022 before they retired their remaining MiG-29s in 2022. On 17 March 2023, the Slovak government approved sending its retired fleet of thirteen MiG-29 fighter jets to Ukraine. On 23 March 2023, the first four aircraft have been handed over to Ukraine. On 17 April 2023 the Slovak Ministry of defence informed that all of the remaining jets have already been sent to Ukraine.

Slovak Air Force

=== Soviet Union ===
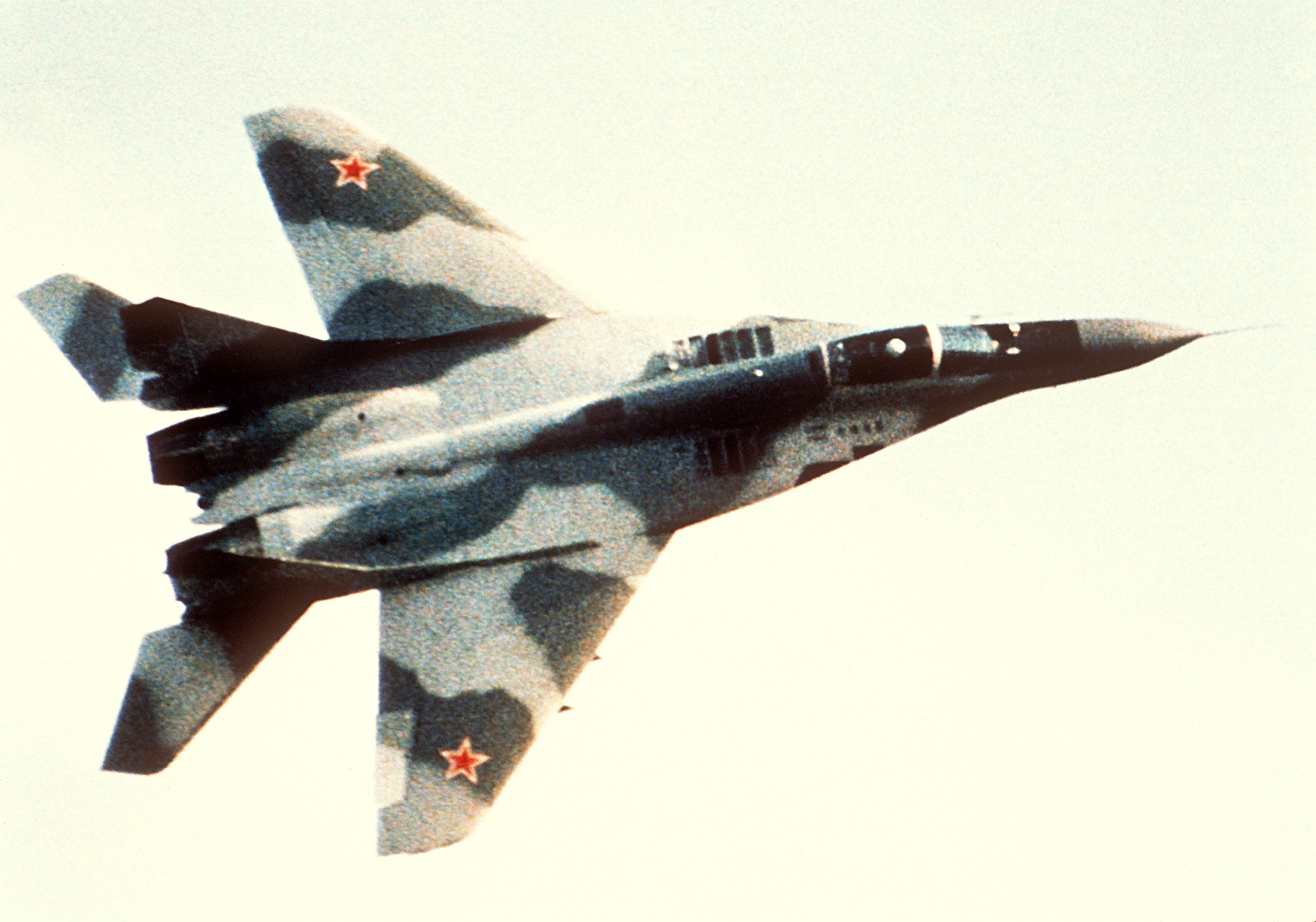
Soviet MiG-29 in 1989

Upon its dissolution in 1991 the Soviet Union had approximately 1,000 aircraft in service. Upon the break-up they were passed to Belarus (50), Ukraine (220), Kazakhstan (40), Uzbekistan (30), Turkmenistan (20). The remaining 600+ were passed to Russia. Many were subsequently sold off to third-party states or written off.

Soviet Air Force

=== Syria ===
Syria had 29 MiG-29s in service as of 2022. MiG-29SM for the Syrian Air Force was based on the MiG-29SM, except the Syrian MiG-29SM used the 9.12 airframe. RAC MiG developed a special variant for Syria. Russia repaired and upgraded several Syrian Air Force MiG-29 fighter jets. In 2007 Syria reportedly signed a deal for 24 Mig-29M2s that was delayed, in 2011 Syria signed a deal for another 24 Mig-29M2's.

In 2019, Belarus reportedly upgraded Syria's fleet of MiG-29s with the BCO "Talisman" Electronic Warfare System, giving the fighter jet a significant increase to its capability.

The Syrian government of Al-Assad fell to rebels in late 2024, and the Syrian Arab Air Force was dismantled. It was re-established as Syrian Air Force, but the revolution, and the Israeli air strikes that followed it, wrecked havoc in the inventory of the Air Force. In late 2025, the World Air Forces publication by FlightGlobal, which tracks the aircraft inventories of world's air forces and publishes its counts annually, removed all Syrian Air Force's aircraft from their World Air Forces 2026 report. It is thus questionable if the Syrian Air Force has any flying aircraft in their inventory, and in particular, any MiG-29, as of December 2025.

Syrian Arab Air Force

- 697 Squadron based at Tsaykal
- 698 Squadron based at Tsaykal
- 699 Squadron based at Tsaykal

=== Yugoslavia ===
Yugoslavia received 14 MiG-29Bs and 2 MiG-29UBs from the Soviet Union in 1987 and 1988. During operation Allied Force, six MiG-29s were shot down, while another three and one MiG-29UB were destroyed on the ground by NATO, One MiG-29 was also lost in a noncombat related accident. Since the dissolution of Yugoslavia the remaining four MiG-29s and single MiG-29UB were passed on to Serbia.

Yugoslav Air Force

- 127th squadron operated 14 MiG-29Bs and 2 MiG-29UB.

== See also ==
- Mikoyan MiG-29M
- Mikoyan MiG-33
- Mikoyan MiG-35
