= Kamieńsk =

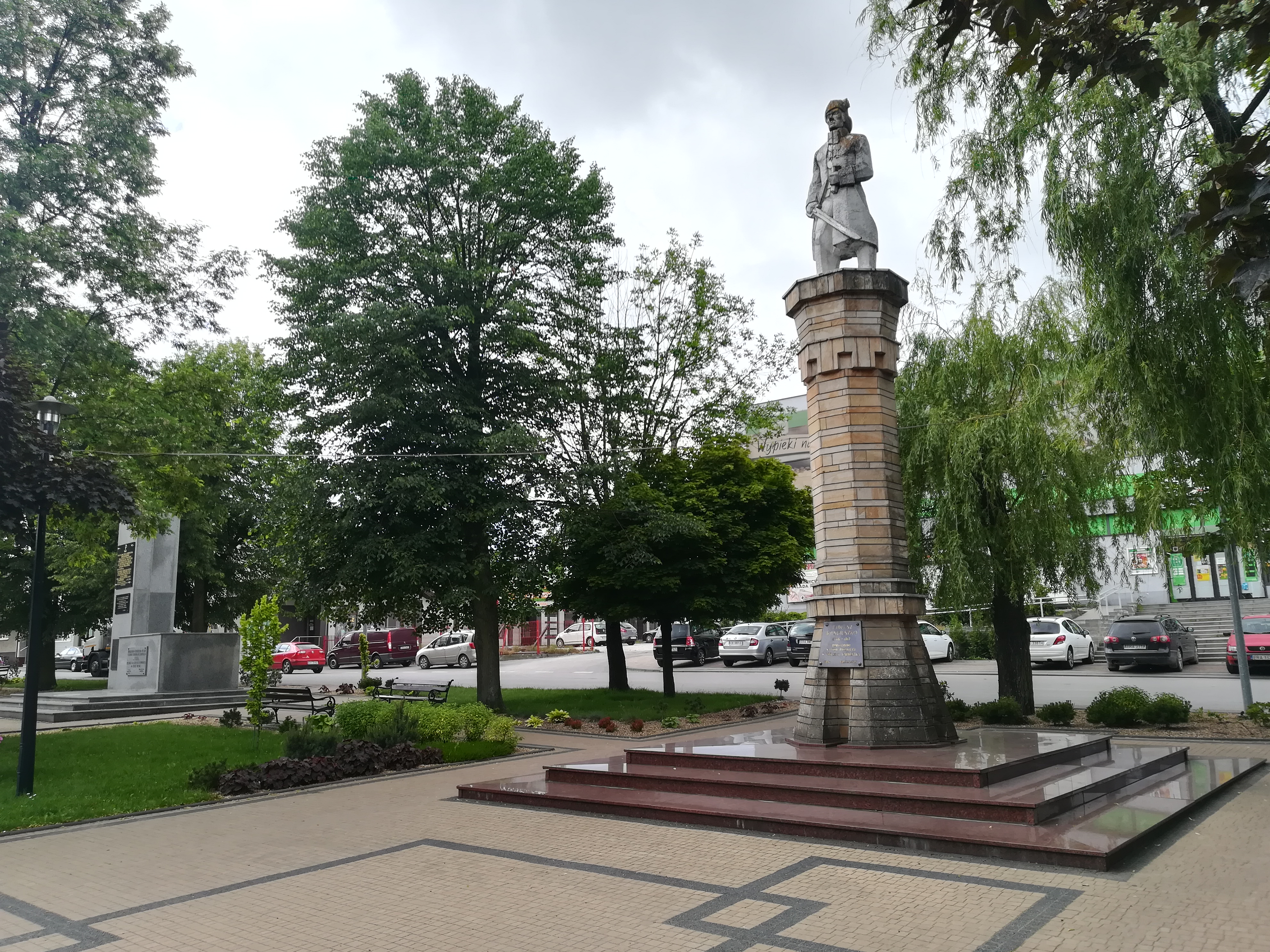
- Tadeusz Kościuszko Monument

- Coat of arms

- Location within Poland
- Coordinates: 51°12′N 19°30′E
- Country: Poland
- Voivodeship: Łódź
- County: Radomsko
- Gmina: Kamieńsk
- First mentioned: 1291
- Town rights: 1374

Government
  - Mayor: Bogdan Pawłowski

Area
  - Total: 11.99 km^{2} (4.63 sq mi)

Population (31 December 2020)
  - Total: 2,703 ▼
  - Density: 225.4/km^{2} (583.9/sq mi)
- Time zone: UTC+1 (CET)
  - Summer (DST): UTC+2 (CEST)
- Postal code: 97-360
- Vehicle registration: ERA
- Website: http://www.kamiensk.com.pl

Kamieńsk (Polish pronunciation: [ˈkamjɛj̃sk]) is a town in south-central Poland, in the Łódź Voivodeship, in Radomsko County. As of 2020, it had 2,703 inhabitants. It is located in the Sieradz Land.

There is an airport named Kamieńsk-Orla Góra in Kamieńsk mainly used for agricultural purposes.

== History ==
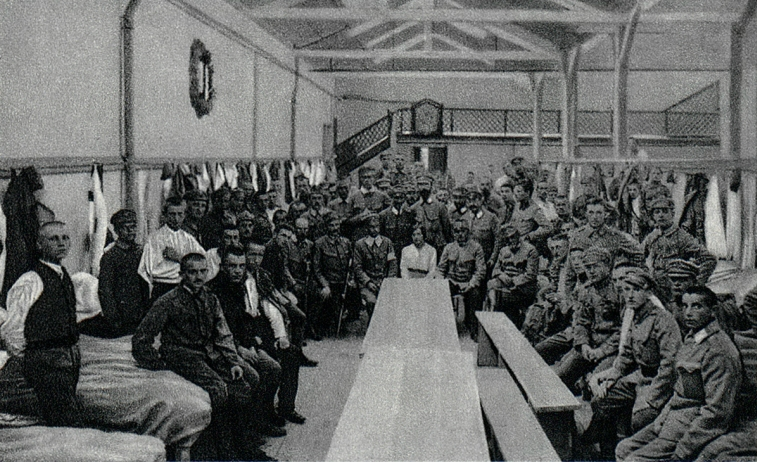
Recovering Polish Legionnaires in Kamieńsk during World War I

The settlement was first mentioned in a document dated 1291. It received its town charter in 1374. It was a private town, administratively located in the Radomsko County in the Sieradz Voivodeship in the Greater Poland Province of the Kingdom of Poland. The settlement lost its status as a town in 1870 but regained it in 1994. Over its history the town has been known as Canisko, Camiesko, Kamińsko, Kamiensko and Kamińsk. The spelling Kamieńsk has been used since 1918.

In the interwar period, it was administratively located in the Łódź Voivodeship of Poland. In the 1921 census, 81.3% of the population declared Polish nationality and 18.6% declared Jewish nationality.

=== Jewish community ===
Jews began to settle in Kamieńsk in the 18th century. The earliest Jewish tombstone in the Kamieńsk cemetery dates from 1831. In the 1870s the town selected Israel Stieglitz as its rabbinic leader. He served as its chief rabbi for over 40 years and died in 1921. His son, Pinchas Stieglitz, was selected as his successor and served in that capacity for a short time. There were three synagogues in the city. In 1900, there were 1,064 Christians and 787 Jews in Kamieńsk. By 1917 the Jewish population had grown to 1,163. The principle occupations of the Jewish people were tailoring, shoe-making and small trade. Pinchas Stieglitz and most of his family were murdered in the Holocaust during the German occupation.

== Demographics ==
Historical population
Year	Pop.	±%
1910	3,027	—
1921	2,390	−21.0%
2010	2,867	+20.0%

== Transport ==
Kamieńsk lies next to the A1 motorway which bypasses it to the west. National road 91 passes through the town. Vovoideship road 484 connects the town to Bełchatów.

Kamieńsk has a station on the Warsaw-Kraków railway line.

== Notable people ==
- Jacek Krzynówek (born 1976), Polish former footballer, capped 96 times for the Poland national football team
