= Poznań–Kobylnica Airport =

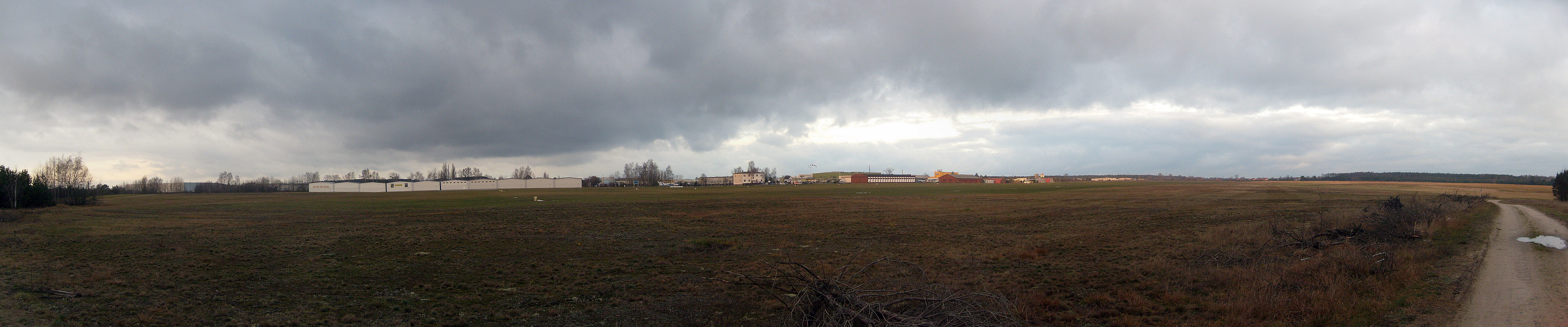
- IATA: none; ICAO: EPPK

Summary
- Airport type: Public
- Owner: Poznań Wanda Modlibowska Aero Club
- Location: Kobylnica, Greater Poland Voivodeship, Poland
- Elevation AMSL: 282 ft / 86 m
- Coordinates: 52°26′03″N 017°02′39″E

Map
- Location of airport in Poland

Runways
Direction	Length		Surface
Direction	ft	m	Surface
07/25	2,461	750	Grass

Poznań–Kobylnica Airport (ICAO: EPPK), also referred to as Ligowiec Airport after a nearby railway station, is a privately owned, public use airport located in Kobylnica near Poznań. The airport is owned by the Poznań Wanda Modlibowska Aero Club.

== History ==
The airport was built by the Germans during World War II. It was captured by Soviet forces on 29 January 1945 and served as a base for Polikarpov Po-2 bombers during the Battle of Poznań.

== Future ==
Around 2019, the Aero Club, which owns the airport, announced it would be moving its base of operations to the EPPG airport in Kąkolewo and selling the Kobylnica airport to a developer. A proposal has been made to redevelop the area of the airport into a "compact city" for 8 thousand people with 133 buildings (98 of them residential), one reaching up to a height of 160 metres, and a new communication node.

== Infrastructure ==
The airport has one runway, a 750 × 100 m (2,461 × 328 ft) grass strip numbered 07/25. There are also several hangars.
