= Suwałki Airport =

Airport in Suwałki

Suwałki Airport Lotnisko Suwałki
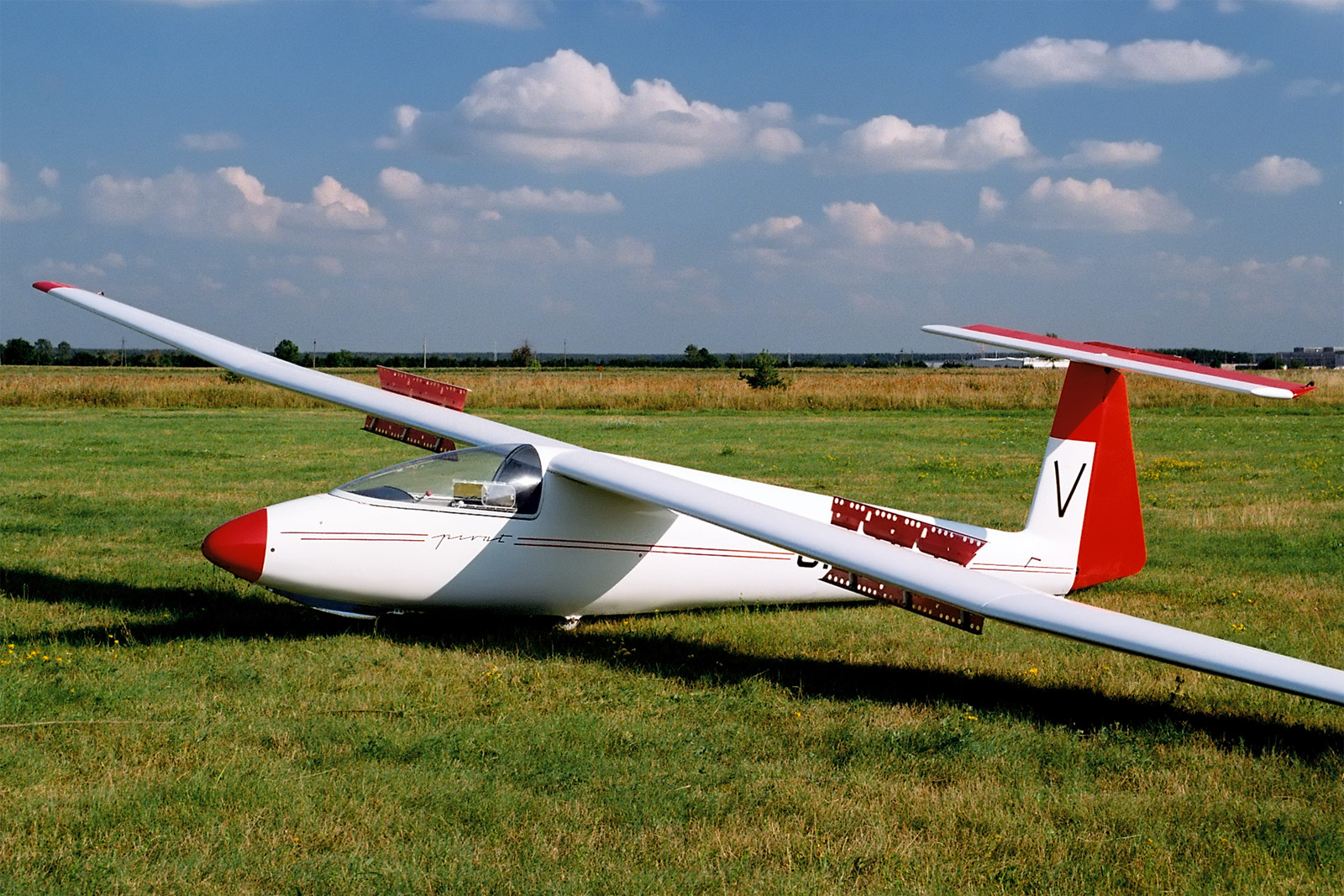
- An SZD-30 Pirat glider at Suwałki Airport
- IATA: QPH; ICAO: EPSU

Summary
- Serves: Suwałki
- Location: Suwałki
- Time zone: CET (UTC+01:00)
- Elevation AMSL: 584 ft (178 m)
- Coordinates: 54°4′27″N 22°53′37″E
- Interactive map of Suwałki Airport

Runways
Direction	Length		Surface
Direction	ft	m	Surface
08L/26R	4,331	1,320	Asphalt
08R/26L	2,625	800	Grass

Suwałki Airport (Polish: Lotnisko Suwałki) is an airport in Suwałki, Poland. It is designed to be a local airport, handling business, air charter and tourist services. The airport has two runways, measuring 1320m × 30m and 800m × 60m respectively, and each accommodating aircraft with up to fifty passengers. The airport also has a Polish Medical Air Rescue (LPR) base.

== Location ==
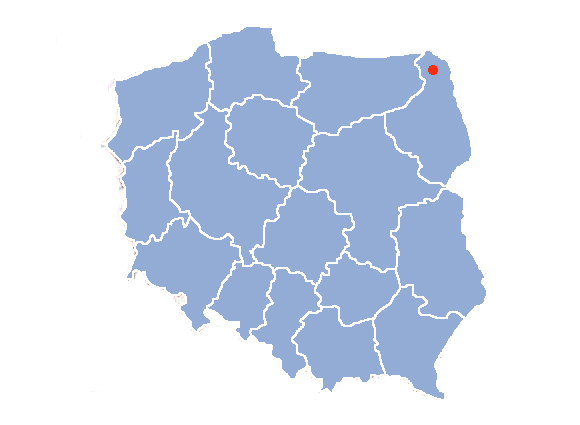
Suwałki Airport's location within Poland

Suwałki Airport is in Podlaskie Voivodeship, around 3km from Suwałki city centre, and covers 110 hectares. The Wigry National Park prevents planes from landing from the east.

== Management ==
Until 9 February 2017, Suwałki Airport was managed by the Suwałki Aeroclub. Since then, it has been run by the Suwałki Aviation School.

== History ==
The German Luftwaffe used the airport as an airfield during World War II, following its construction during 1940 and spring 1941. Around 2,500 men from at least four Luftwaffe construction battalions, as well as a large number of local labourers, were working on the airfield by May 1941.

On 23 October 1944, the airfield was captured by the Soviet 3rd Belorussian Front.

== Funding ==
Since 2020, PLN (złoty) 27 million (original estimate: PLN 15–16 million) has been allocated to modernisation projects, including a new runway (08R/26L, constructed in August 2020), a turnaround section, an apron, a taxiway, technical infrastructure, and additional LED lighting on both runways. PLN 10 million was provided by Forte, PLN 11 million from the Suwałki City Budget, and PLN 6 million by the Podlaskie Voivodeship government.

== Air Rescue Base ==
The Polish Medical Air Rescue opened a base at Suwałki airport on 4 June 2005, costing PLN 6.2 million. The current head of the base is Zbigniew Dąbrowski, with the base serving the Suwałki and Masuria regions. In 2011, the base received a new helicopter. The heliport, named 'Suwałki - Szpital', was commissioned in 2014. The operator of the heliport is Dr. Ludwik Rydygier Provincial Hospital.

== Air shows ==
Every year, Suwałki Airport hosts the Odlotowe Suwałki Air Show.
