= Sochaczew-Bielice Airport =

Sochaczew-Bielice Airport Mazowiecki Port Lotniczy Sochaczew
- IATA: none; ICAO: EPSO

Summary
- Airport type: Public
- Serves: Warsaw, Poland
- Coordinates: 52°11′55″N 20°17′23″E
- Website: www.airsochaczew.com

Map
- Location of airport in Poland

Runways
Direction	Length		Surface
Direction	m	ft	Surface
0	2,500	0	Concrete

Statistics (2007 +/- change from 2006)
- Passengers: 0
- Cargo (in tons): 0
- Takeoffs/Landings: 0
- Source: Polish AIP at EUROCONTROL

Sochaczew has 40,000 inhabitants and is located in Greater Warsaw Area. In Sochaczew there is a military airport in Sochaczew-Bielice. There are plans of local governments to convert it into a low-cost airport for Łódź, western part of Mazowsze and nearby Warsaw agglomeration of 2,6 million inhabitants (54 kilometers to the east). There exists an association, “Stowarzyszenie Port Lotniczy Sochaczew”, supporting the project, and in 2006 it was decided to create a public limited company with the task to open the airport. The runway has 2500 m length and 60 m width, and a concrete-asphalt surface possessing a good pressure index, overrun areas for increased safety, and a parallel, grass-surfaced runway. It is possible to introduce rail link directly to the airport, even connected with trains to Warsaw. It is also possible to build a short section of trail tracks in order to introduce a direct rail link to Warsaw.

== Airport infrastructure ==
There exists a railroad line to the terminal that can be used for passenger service.
