= Kobylnica, Greater Poland Voivodeship =

Kobylnica
- Village
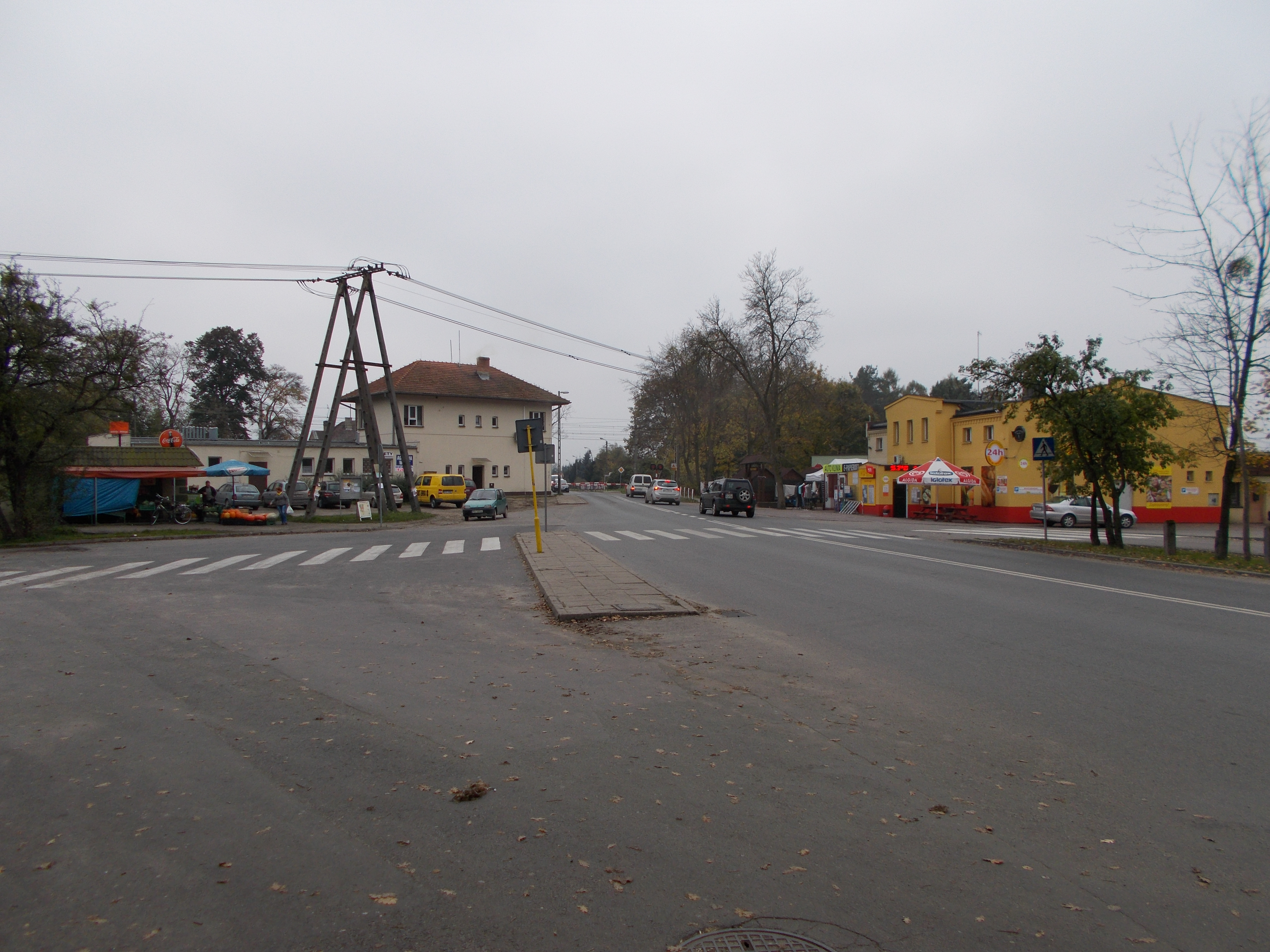

- Location within Poland
- Coordinates: 52°26′N 17°4′E
- Country: Poland
- Voivodeship: Greater Poland
- County: Poznań
- Gmina: Swarzędz

Population
  - Total: 1,480
- Time zone: UTC+1 (CET)
  - Summer (DST): UTC+2 (CEST)
- Postal code: 62-006
- Vehicle registration: PZ
- Website: http://www.kobylnica.com.pl/

Kobylnica [kɔbɨlˈnit͡sa] is a village in the administrative district of Gmina Swarzędz, within Poznań County, Greater Poland Voivodeship, in west-central Poland.

== History ==
During the German occupation of Poland (World War II), the occupiers operated a forced labour camp for Jews in the village from April 1942 to August 1943.
