= Opole-Kamień Śląski Airport =

Airport in Poland

Opole-Kamień Śląski Airport Lądowisko Kamień Śląski
- IATA: none; ICAO: EPKN

Summary
- Airport type: Public
- Serves: Opole, Poland
- Elevation AMSL: 208 m / 682 ft
- Coordinates: 50°31′45″N 18°05′05″E

Map
- Location of the airfield in Poland

Runways
Direction	Length		Surface
Direction	m	ft	Surface
11/29	900	3,248	Blacktop

Statistics (2007 +/- change from 2006)
- Passengers: 0
- Cargo (in tons): 0
- Takeoffs/Landings: 0
- Source: Polish AIP at EUROCONTROL

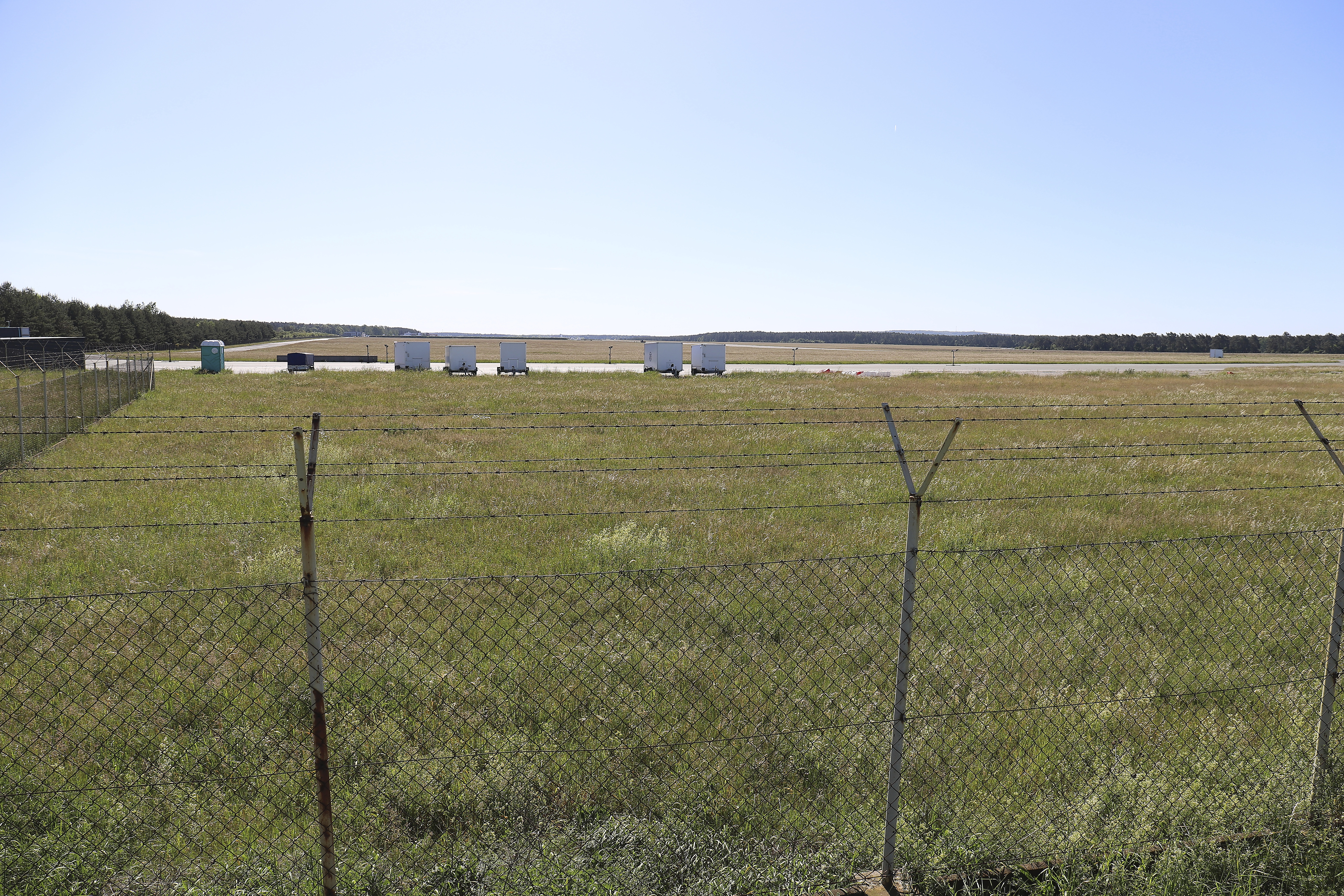

Opole-Kamień Śląski Airport (Polish: Lądowisko Kamień Śląski) (ICAO: EPKN) is a former military airfield located in Kamień Śląski, 17 kilometers south of the city of Opole. The airport has a single 900x60m blacktop runway.

== History ==
Up to the end of World War II the airfield (then Luftwaffe Groß Stein) was base for Germany's Zerstörergeschwader 2 (2nd Destroyer Wing). In the mid 20th century it was expanded and modernised under the ownership of the Red Army. Until 1987, Kamień Śląski served as an auxiliary airport for Poland's 39th Fighter Aviation Regiment, and from 1989 onwards, Poland's 2nd Fighter Aviation Squadron. By the mid 1990s the land had fallen into disrepair and was sold by the Ministry of National Defence in 2003. In 2013 the airport was re-opened for general aviation traffic under private ownership.
