= 23rd Air Base =

23rd Air Base
- 23 Baza Lotnictwa Taktycznego
- Minsk Mazowiecki, Masovian Voivodeship in Poland
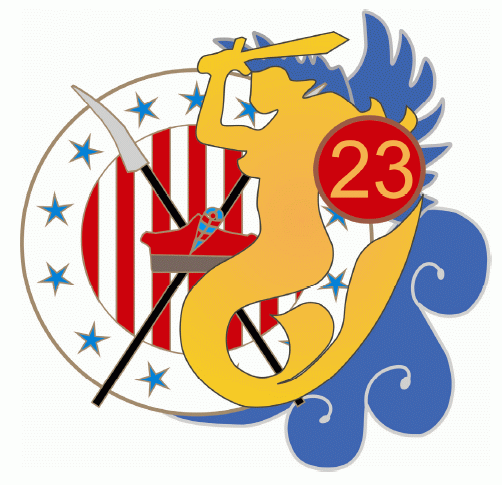
- 23rd Air Base Emblem

Site information
- Type: Air Base
- Owner: Ministry of National Defence
- Operator: Polish Air Force
- Status: Active
- Website: https://23blt.wp.mil.pl/

Location
- Shown within Poland 23rd Air Base (Europe) 23rd Air Base (Masovian Voivodeship)
- Coordinates: 52°11′26.40″N 21°39′14.99″E

Site history
- Built: 1957
- In use: 1 January 2001 - Present

Garrison information
- Current commander: Col. Ryszard Gorczyca
- Past commanders: Col. Krzysztof Stobiecki, Col. Piotr Iwaszko, Col. Maciej Trelka, Col. Robert Kozak, Col. Robert Cierniak, Col. Jan Rajchel, Col. Włodzimierz Usarek

Airfield information
- Identifiers: ICAO: EPMM
- Elevation: 184 metres (604 ft) AMSL
Runways
Direction	Length and surface
09/27	2,500 metres (8,202 ft) Concrete
- Sources: Scramble/Polot/Military Aviation Authority

The 23rd Air Base (Polish: 23 Baza Lotnicza) is a Polish Air Force Air Base, located 6 km east of Mińsk Mazowiecki. It was officially established on 1 January 2001, replacing the disbanded 1st Fighter Aviation Regiment "Warszawa". Up until 2010, the primary operational unit that was based there was the 1st Air Tactical Squadron. This unit was supposed to replace the 1st Fighter Aviation Regiment alongside the 23rd Air Base. However, since the 2010 reforms as part of Decyzja nr Z-31/Org./P1 z 25 sierpnia 2009 r., the 1st Air Tactical Squadron has been disbanded and has instead merged with the 23rd Tactical Air Base. Up until December 2022, the 23rd Air Base operated MiG-29 fighter jets. The MiG-29 fighter jets have since been fully replaced by 12 FA-50GF 'Gap Fillers', a variant of the Korea Aerospace Industries FA-50. This modern replacement has been a crucial part of Poland's modernization plan. The 23rd Air Base continues to provide operational capability to the Polish Air Force to this day.

Its close proximity to Warsaw makes it a key strategic location for the Polish Air Force and allies. The Air Base is used to provide air defence around the Polish capital and NATO airspace. The base boasts modernized infrastructure, reinforced aircraft shelters, and can even facilitate large aircraft. During peacetime, it serves as an FA-50GF host, capable of scrambling Polish QRA FA-50GF aircraft at a moment's notice. The base also provides logistical security for flights and overflights of military aircraft. During wartime, it can be rapidly transformed and used as a staging ground for the Polish Air Force and allies alike. Recent upgrades include expanded hangars and enhanced training facilities in preparation for the current FA-50GF aircraft and incoming FA-50PL aircraft, highlighting Poland's willingness to modernize and improve capabilities. The base is fully integrated into NATINAD. The base also hosts pilot training, both in simulators and the real thing. The 23rd Air Base can provide and support Search and Rescue operations. Joint exercises with U.S. and NATO allies have been hosted here before.

In 2010, the base went through a huge reorganization, reforming its structure and changing its name from the 23rd Air Base to the 23rd Tactical Air Base in order to emphasize its tactical role.

On 18 December 2017, one of the MiG-29 aircraft stationed here at the base crash landed in a forest near Kałuszyn while on approach to land. The pilot survived. Initial reports were contradictory as to whether he had ejected. On 21 December 2017, the Ministry of National Defense confirmed that the pilot did not eject. This incident marked the first crash of a MiG-29 during its nearly three decades of its operational service in the Polish Air Force. A second crash followed on 4 March 2019. This time the pilot ejected and survived.

Following Russia's 2022 invasion of the Ukraine, the 23rd Air Base has maintained and continues to maintain a crucial role in Poland's defence and deterrence. This Air Base sits extremely close to the Ukrainian and Belarusian border, and is within range of Kaliningrad and the Baltic states, emphasizing its significant role of Polish air power in the region.

In mid-December 2022, all remaining MiG-29 aircraft stationed at the 23rd Air Base were transferred to the 22nd Air Base in Malbork. The 23rd Air Base now hosts 12 Block 50 FA-50GF 'Gap Fillers', while awaiting arrival of the more advanced FA-50PL Block 70 aircraft; a Polish variant of the Korea Aerospace Industries FA-50 featuring the latest block upgrade. The FA-50PL deliveries are expected to arrive in 2027–2029, effectively fully replacing the MiG-29 as a newer platform. As of 2026, it seems like the FA-50GF variants will not be upgraded to the FA-50PL standard for training purposes, and Poland will operate a fleet of 2 FA-50 variants.

In July 2025, the 23rd Air Base's FA-50GF aircraft returned to the 23rd Air Base from their temporary accommodation at the 31st Air Base in Poznań after critical maintenance was carried out on the 23rd Air Base's airfield. These aircraft were absent from the Air Base for over 5 weeks. The 31st Air Base was chosen to accommodate the FA-50GF aircraft due to similarities to their home base. At the same time, it was announced that a special envoy from the Republic of Korea was coming to visit the Air Base to reaffirm the strategic partnership between Poland and South Korea and to highlight the importance of defence industry cooperation for the two nations.

In August 2025, Polish Air Force and German Air Force inspectors met up at the 23rd Air Base. This was part of a planned operation, spanning multiple weeks and involving 150 German soldiers. 5 German Eurofighter Typhoon fighter jets were sent and stationed at the 23rd Air Base. This was reportedly to strengthen the eastern flank of NATO, meanwhile providing a credible deterrent.

The first commander of the base was Colonel Włodzimierz Usarek.
