= List of airports in Lithuania =

This is a list of airports in Lithuania, grouped by type and sorted by location.

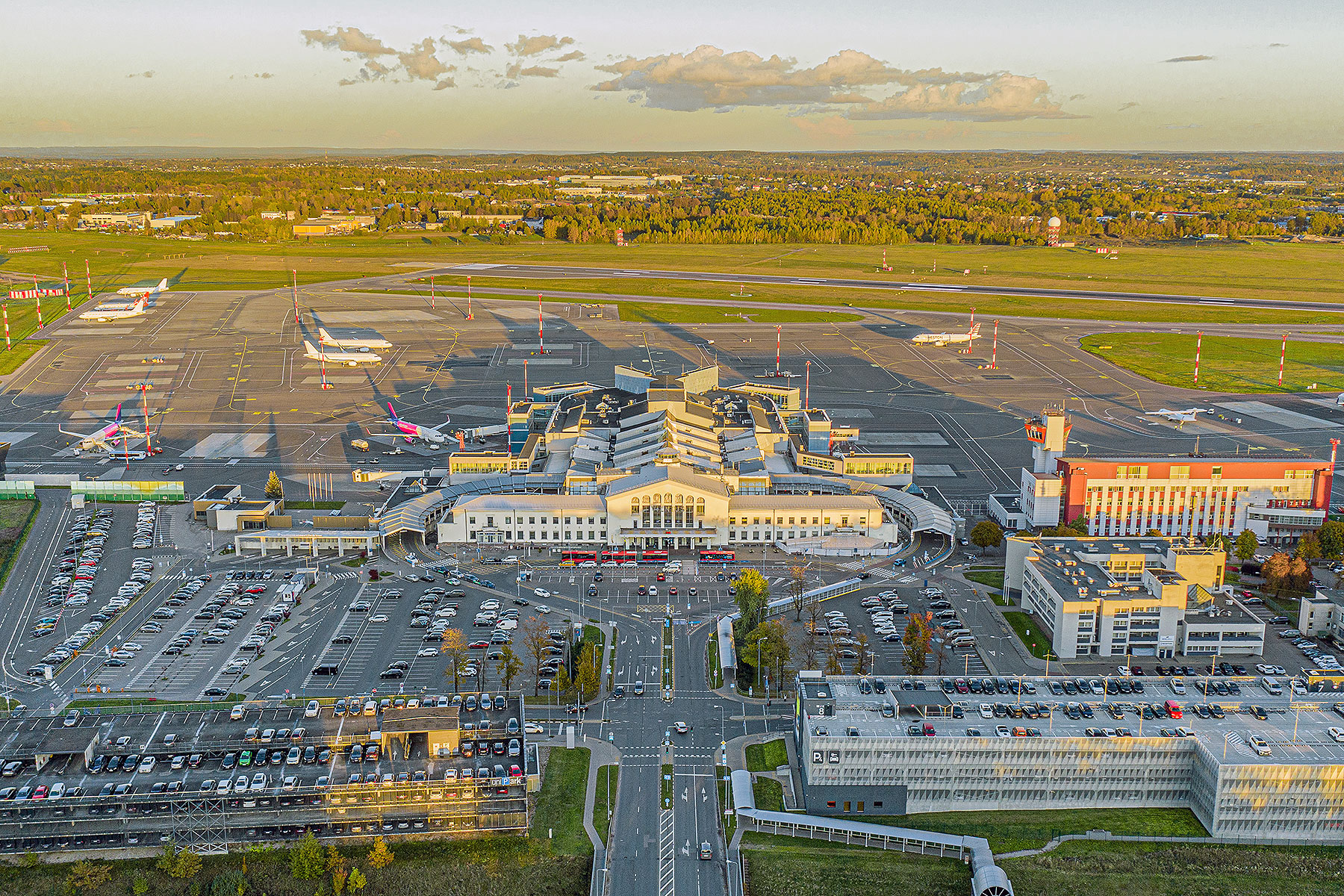
Vilnius Airport, Lithuania's largest airport

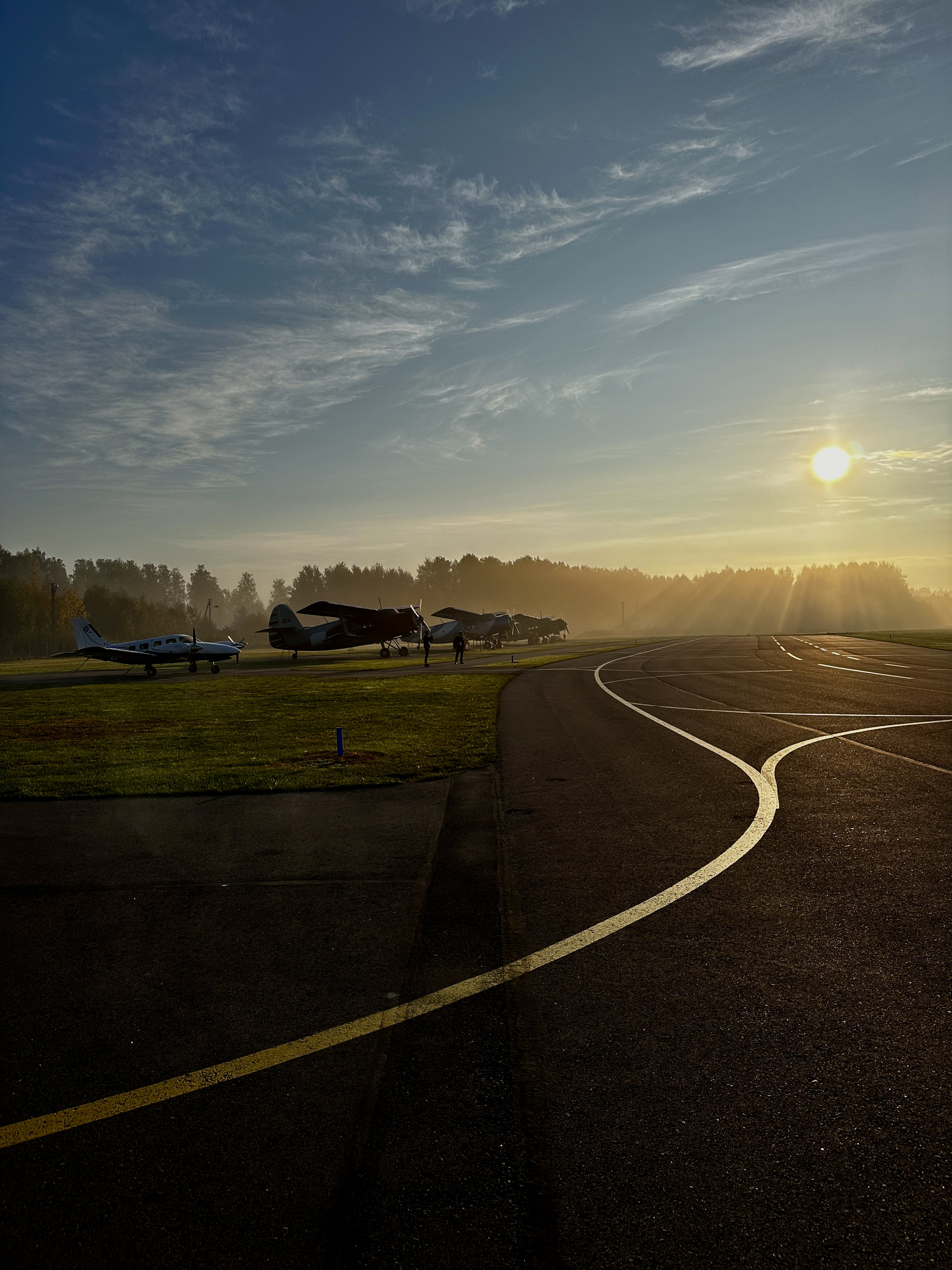
Kyviškės Airfield, a non commercial airport near Vilnius

== Airports ==
City served / Location	ICAO	IATA	Airport name	Coordinates
International				
Kaunas	EYKA	KUN	Kaunas International Airport	54°57′50″N 024°05′05″E
Palanga	EYPA	PLQ	Palanga International Airport	55°58′24″N 021°05′38″E
Šiauliai	EYSA	SQQ	Šiauliai International Airport (CIV/MIL)	55°53′38″N 023°23′42″E
Vilnius	EYVI	VNO	Vilnius Čiurlionis International Airport	54°38′13″N 025°17′16″E
Domestic				
Akmenė	EYNA		Akmenė Airport (Akmenė Aero Club)	56°14′34″N 022°43′58″E
Alytus	EYAL		Alytus Airport (Alytus Aero Club)	54°24′47″N 024°03′25″E
Barysiai / Šiauliai	EYSB	HLJ	Barysiai Airport (Šiauliai Airport) (CIV/MIL)	56°04′17″N 023°33′11″E
Biržai	EYBI		Biržai Airport (Biržai Aero Club)	56°10′29″N 024°45′53″E
Druskininkai	EYDR		Druskininkai Airport	54°00′59″N 023°56′37″E
Jurbarkas	EYJB		Jurbarkas Airport	55°07′05″N 22°45′54″E
Kartena / Klaipėda	EYKT		Kartena Airport (Klaipėda Glider Club)	55°55′13″N 021°34′02″E
Kaunas	EYKG		Kaunas/Gamykla Airport (Kaunas State Aviation Enterprise)	54°52′46″N 023°54′18″E
Kaunas	EYKS		S. Darius and S. Girėnas Airport	54°52′49″N 023°52′55″E
Kazlų Rūda	EYKR		Kazlų Rūda Air Base (MIL)	54°48′20″N 23°31′59″E
Kėdainiai	EYKD		Kėdainiai Airport	55°18′42″N 023°57′12″E
Klaipėda	EYKL	KLJ	Klaipėda Airport	55°42′43″N 021°14′34″E
Kyviškės	EYVK		Kyviškės Airfield (MIL)	54°40′05″N 25°30′56″E
Molėtai	EYMO		Molėtai Airport (Molėtai Aero Club)	55°06′47″N 025°20′12″E
Nemirseta	EYNE		Nemirseta Airport	55°51′42″N 021°04′44″E
Nida	EYND		Nida Airport	55°19′40″N 021°02′44″E
Paluknys / Vilnius	EYVP		Paluknys Airport (Vilnius Aero Club)	54°28′59″N 024°59′23″E
Panevėžys	EYPN		Panevėžys Airport (Panevėžys Aero Club)	55°42′32″N 024°20′43″E
Panevėžys / Istra	EYPI		Panevėžys/Istra Airport (Aerodromas "Istra")	55°49′39″N 024°21′23″E
Panevėžys	EYPP	PNV	Panevėžys Air Base (Pajuostis)	55°43′48″N 024°27′36″E
Pikeliškės	EYPK		Pikeliškės Airport	
Pociūnai / Kaunas	EYPR		Pociūnai Airport (Kaunas Parachute Club)	54°39′13″N 024°03′26″E
Rojūnai	EYRO		Rojūnai Airport	55°36′40″N 024°13′03″E
Rokiškis	EYRK		Rokiškis Airport	55°58′19″N 25°36′15″E
Rūdiškės	EYRD		Rūdiškės Airport	54°29′49″N 023°43′06″E
Rukla / Jonava	EYRU		Rukla Airport (Jonava Airport)	55°00′36″N 024°21′48″E
Sasnava	EYMM		Sasnava Airport (Marijampolė Aero Club)	54°39′44″N 023°27′08″E
Šeduva / Šiauliai	EYSE		Šeduva Airport (Šiauliai Aero Club)	55°44′42″N 023°48′31″E
Šilutė	EYSI		Šilutė Airport (MIL)	55°20′13″N 21°31′50″E
Tauragė	EYTR		Tauragė Airport (Tauragė Aero Club)	55°13′54″N 022°09′01″E
Telšiai	EYTL		Telšiai Airport (Telšiai Aero Club)	55°59′15″N 022°17′33″E
Tirkšliai / Mažeikiai	EYMA		Tirkšliai Airport (Mažeikiai Aviation Sport Club)	56°13′43″N 022°15′17″E
Utena	EYUT		Utena Airport (Utena Aero Club)	55°29′21″N 025°43′06″E
Zarasai	EYZA		Zarasai Airport (Zarasai Aero Club)	55°45′09″N 026°15′25″E
Žėkiškės	EYZE		Žėkiškės Airport	

== See also ==
- Transport in Lithuania
- List of airports by ICAO code: EH-EY#EY - Lithuania
- Wikipedia:WikiProject Aviation/Airline destination lists: Europe#Lithuania
- List of the largest airports in the Nordic countries
