= Jonava railway station =

Railway station in Jonava, Lithuania

Jonava
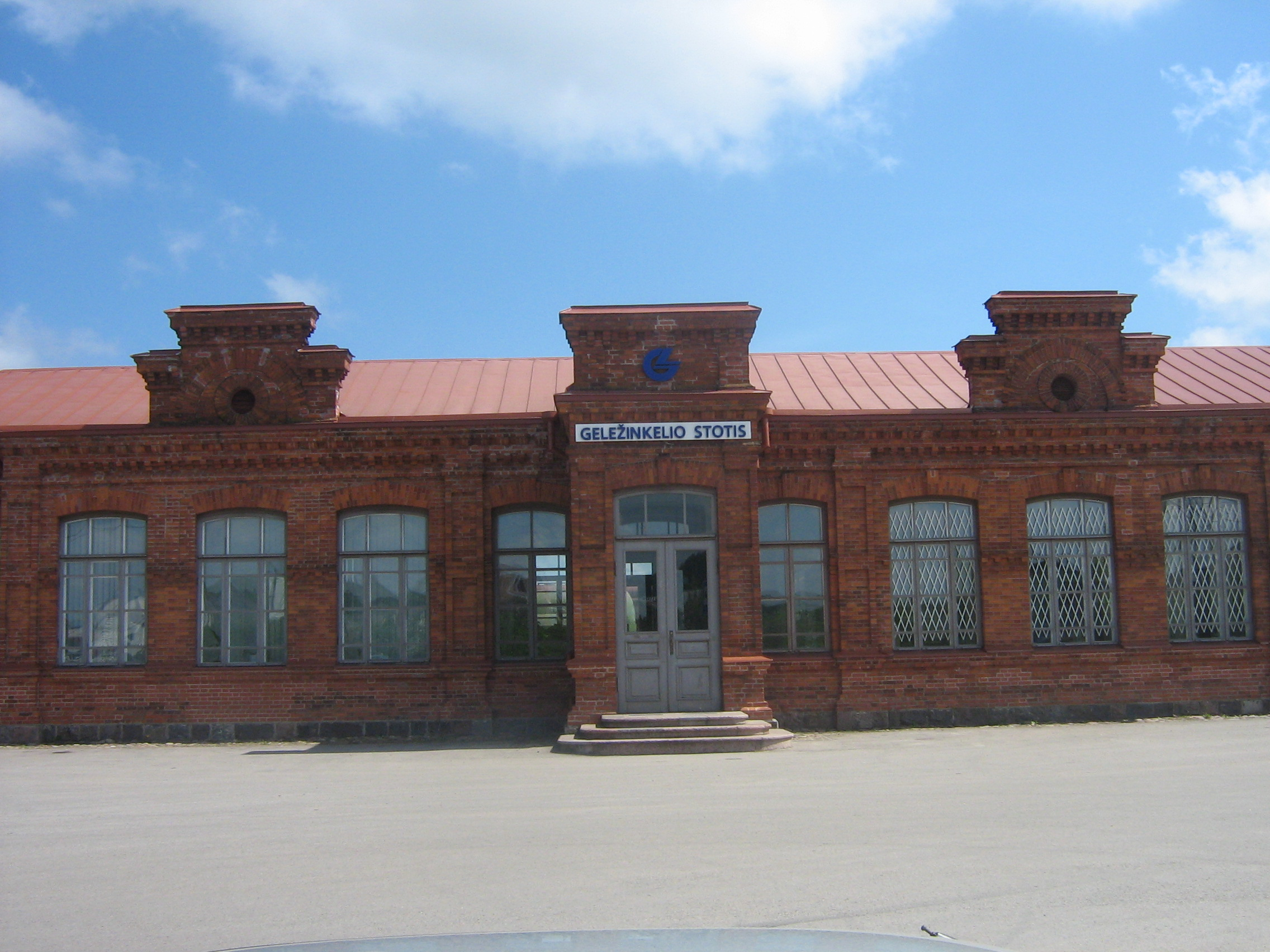
- Part of historical station building in 2010

General information
- Location: Stoties g. 2, Jonava; Lithuania
- Coordinates: 55°5′36.6″N 24°16′31.8″E
- Operator: Lietuvos geležinkeliai
- Lines: Vilnius–Klaipėda; Rail Baltica
- Tracks: 6
- Train operators: Lietuvos geležinkeliai
- Connections: Bus interchange

Other information
- Website: www.litrail.lt

History
- Opened: 1871
Location
- Location within Lithuania

Jonava railway station (Lithuanian: Jonavos geležinkelio stotis) is a Lithuanian Railways station in Jonava. The structure is included in the list of architectural monuments of Lithuania (code S 440). The station was built in 1871.

Map of the Lithuanian railway network

== See also ==
- Jonava railway bridge
- Jonava railway viaduct
- List of railway stations in Lithuania
- Rail transport in Lithuania
- Transport in Lithuania
