= Nida Airfield =

Nida Airport
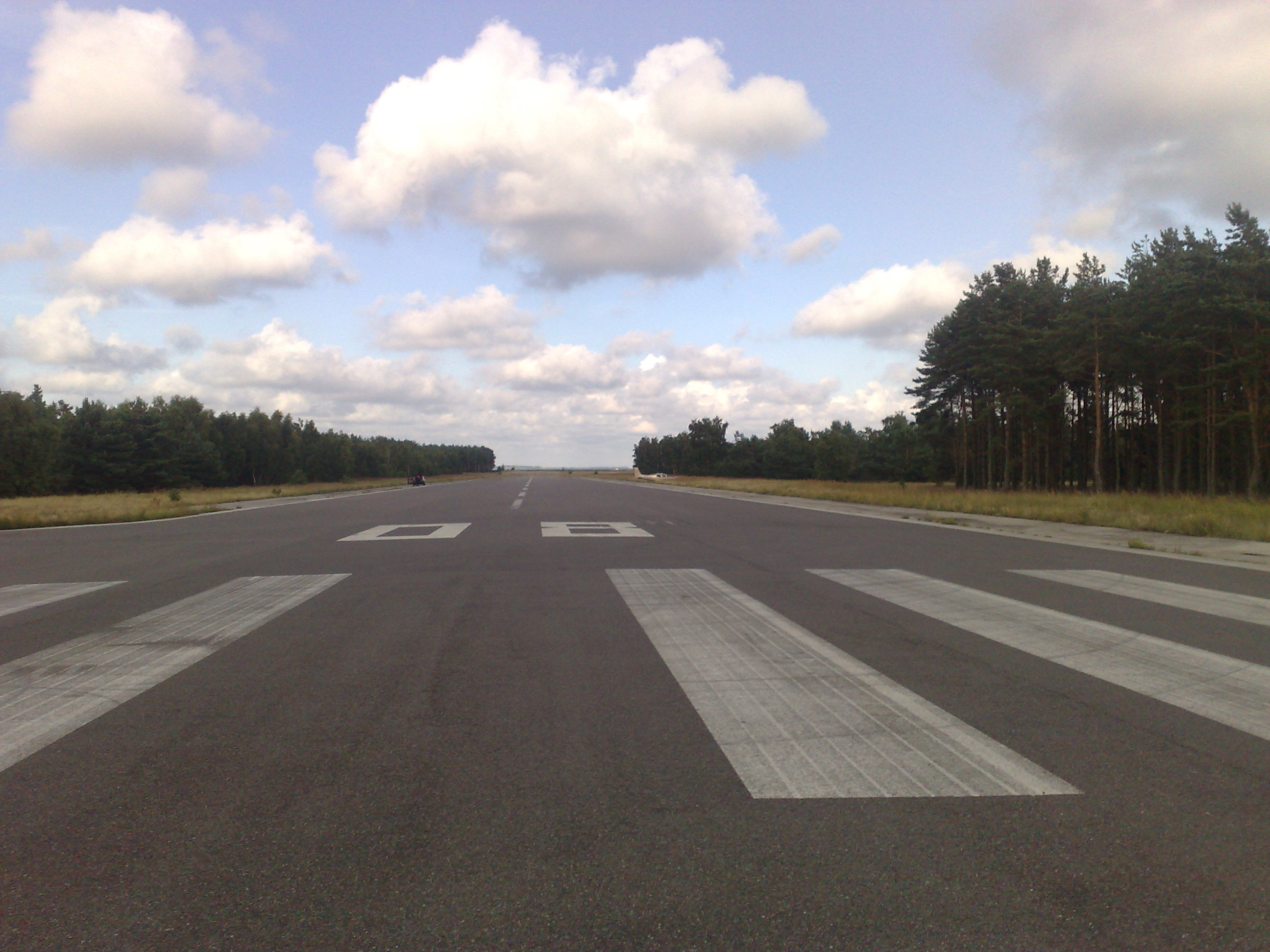
- IATA: none; ICAO: EYNI

Summary
- Airport type: Public
- Location: Nida, Lithuania
- Elevation AMSL: 9 ft (2.7 m)
- Coordinates: 55°19′41″N 21°2′53″E
- Interactive map of Nida Airport

Runways
Direction	Length		Surface
Direction	m	ft	Surface
07/25	560 x 60 (500 x 30)	1,837 x 197 (1,640 x 98)	Asphalt

Nida Airfield (ICAO: EYNI) is a small regional airfield, opened in 1967, located in Nida, in the western part of Lithuania, near the Baltic Sea and Klaipėda. The airport's infrastructure can handle small and medium sized aircraft, such as the Saab 2000 and Saab 340.

In 1998-2006 the runway surface, apron and taxiways were renovated by the government, but it was sufficient only to serve helicopters. After further reconstruction, the airport was officially reopened on 18 June 2016 for light aircraft (seating capacity up to four), gliders and helicopters. At that time, the airport had no refueling facilities and was formally just an airstrip with the assigned code A 129 and ICAO EYND (coordinates 55°19'40"N 21°2'45"E, 6 ft/2 m AMSL elevation, runway direction 08/26 and 815 m/2,674 ft asphalt).

The facility was classified as a certified aerodrome on 3 July 2020 per NOTAM B0038/20 with new ICAO identifier EYNI and runway designator 07/25 (direction 73/253 deg mag) with dimensions 500 x 30 m (strip: 560 x 60 m, MTOM 5,700 kg) and call sign NIDA RADIO on ch 128.705.

== Destinations ==
- Airline:
  - Nida-Vilnius-Nida (1970–1975)
  - Nida-Palanga-Nida (1970–1975)
  - Nida-Kaunas-Nida (1970–1975)
- Charter flights

== See also ==
- List of airports in Lithuania
- Palanga International Airport
- Klaipėda Airport
