= EYSI =

EYSI may refer to:

- Eu Yan Sang International
- Šilutė Airfield, ICAO code
