= Jonava railway viaduct =

Viaduct in Lithuania

Coordinates: 55°4′43″N 24°17′15″E

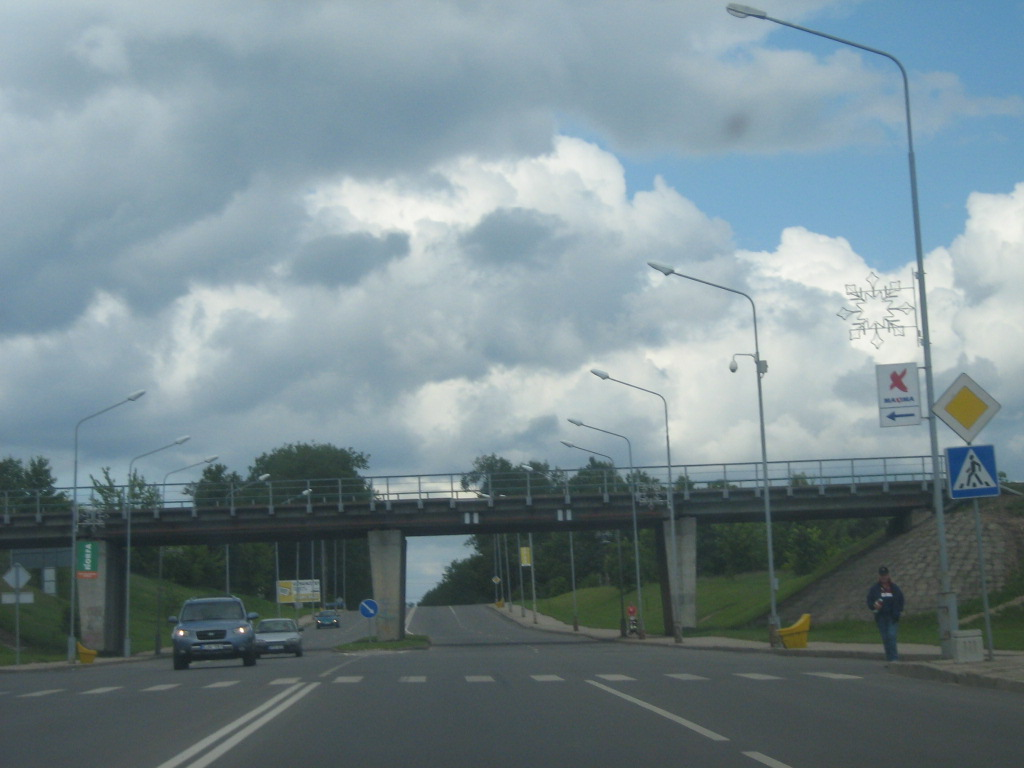
Railway viaduct

Jonava railway viaduct (lit. Jonavos geležinkelio viadukas) is a railway viaduct over the Jonas Basanavičius street (main street) in Jonava (Jonava district municipality), ninth largest city in Lithuania with a population of ca 28,000 (2017).

== Geography ==
The viaduct is located in the eastern part of town, at the intersection of Ateities and Lietavos streets on Atminimo Park, not far from the settlement of the Forestry Jonava, on highway Jonava-Ukmergė, Jonava Soldiers Memorial Cemetery. About 100 meters (to the train station, located in Gaižiūnai) is Jonava railway bridge over the Neris. From the viaduct one can see the panorama of the city center and the district of Paneriai.
