= Kyviškės airfield =

Airfield near Vilnius, Lithuania

Kyviškės airfield Kyviškių aerodromas
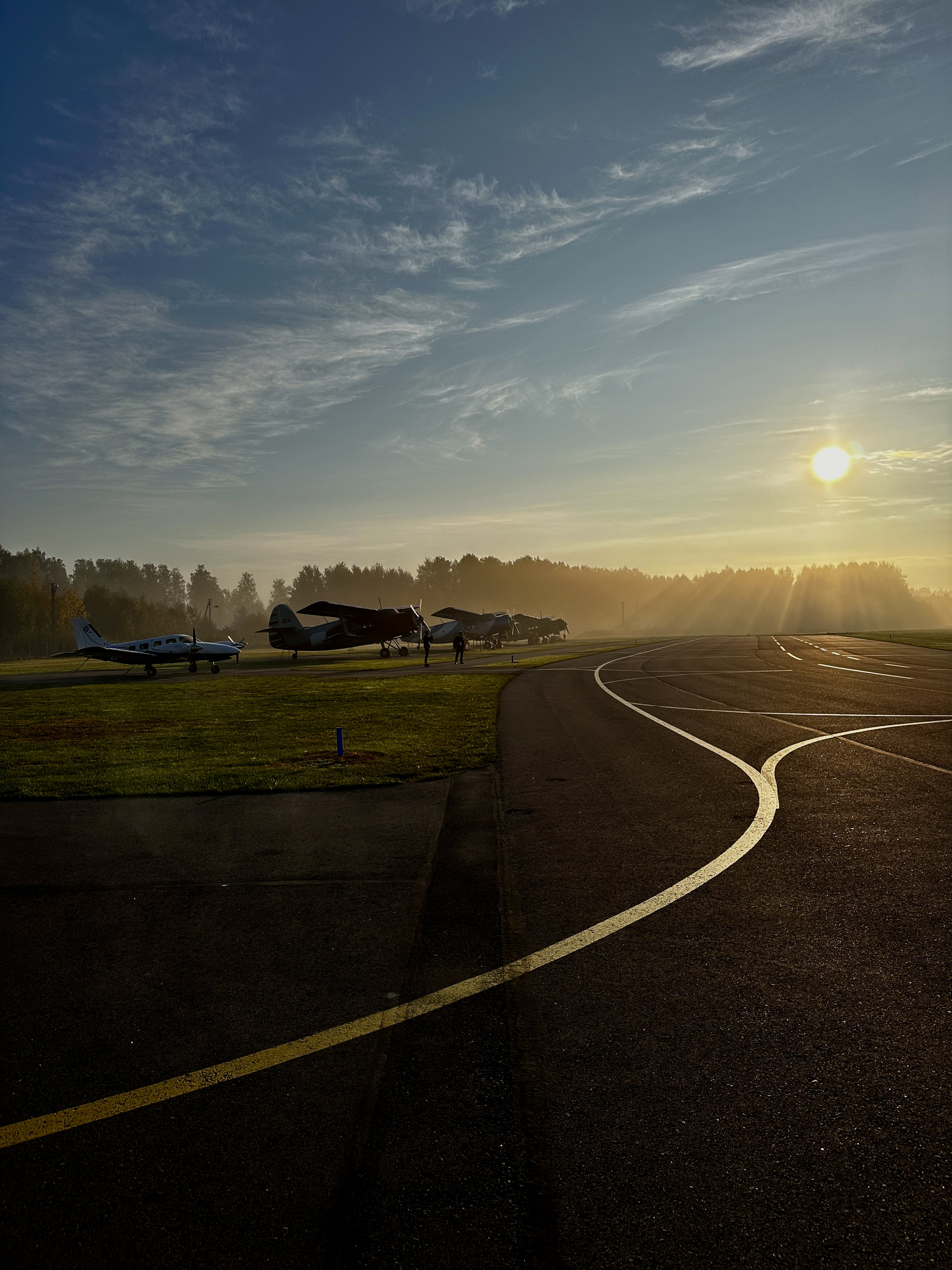
- IATA: none; ICAO: EYVK

Summary
- Airport type: Public
- Operator: Vilnius Tech
- Serves: Vilnius (Lithuania)
- Location: Kyviškės, Vilnius District Municipality, Lithuania
- Opened: 1947; 79 years ago
- In use: 1947–present
- Elevation AMSL: 163 m / 535 ft
- Coordinates: 54°40′21″N 025°30′22″E

Maps
- Location within Lithuania
- Interactive map of Kyviškės airfield

Runways
Direction	Length		Surface
Direction	m	ft	Surface
13/31	540	1,771	Asphalt
15/33	650	2,133	Grass
13/31	337	1,106	Grass

Kyviškės airfield (ICAO: EYVK) is a small regional airfield, opened in 1947, located in Kyviškės village, east of Vilnius. Runway, which is 540 meters in length and 23 meters in width, was thoroughly renovated in 2016. Traffic at the airfield is most intense during the summer months, with 200-300 daily lift-offs and landings. As of 2023, this airfield is primarily used for events and trainings, no domestic or international commercial routes operate here. Vilnius Airport located about 25 km away by car is the closest commercial airport.

== Pilot training ==
Vilnius Tech operates a pilot school at the airfield for both planes and helicopters. BAA Training also has operations here.

== Recreational activities ==
Multiple aerobatic flying competitions in different categories are arranged at the airfield every year. Local paragliding, skydiving and aerobatic flying clubs have bases at the airfield. Several national skydiving records have been achieved at this airfield. Lithuanian annual high school rocketry competition is held here.

Lithuania's former president Rolandas Paksas started and ended his 47 day flight around the world at this airfield.

== Cinema ==
Kyviškės airfield has been the filming location for various scenes in movies, TV series and commercials. It was one of the filming locations for Stranger Things (season 4).

== Drone events ==
Kyviškės airfield is the location for annual "Drone Days" event, where international defence suppliers showcase their UAV technologies and solutions. The event is arranged by the Lithuanian Ministry of Defence.

A separate annual drone event by Vilnius Tech is also held at Kyviškės airfield.

== War and independence ==
During World War II, multiple military planes were based here, including combined 68 units of Tupolev SB and Arkhangelsky Ar-2 as well 7 units of Petlyakov Pe-2.

When Lithuania regained its independence in 1990, Lithuanian National Defence Volunteer Forces used Kyviškės airfield as an airbase. In the early days after the declaration of independence, Kyviškės Airfield would have been used for government evacuation, in case of a reinvasion.

== Criticism ==
In 2017, Lithuanian aerobatic pilot Jurgis Kairys stated that the neglected with a lot of unfulfilled potential. According to him, Vilnius Tech, the current owner and operator of the aerodrome, makes it difficult to develop and expand sporting and commercial activities at the airfield.

== See also ==
- List of airports in Lithuania
