= Vilnius Gediminas Technical University =

Public university in Vilnius, Lithuania

Coordinates: 54.7223235°N 25.335736°E

VILNIUS TECH
- Vilniaus Gedimino Technikos Universitetas
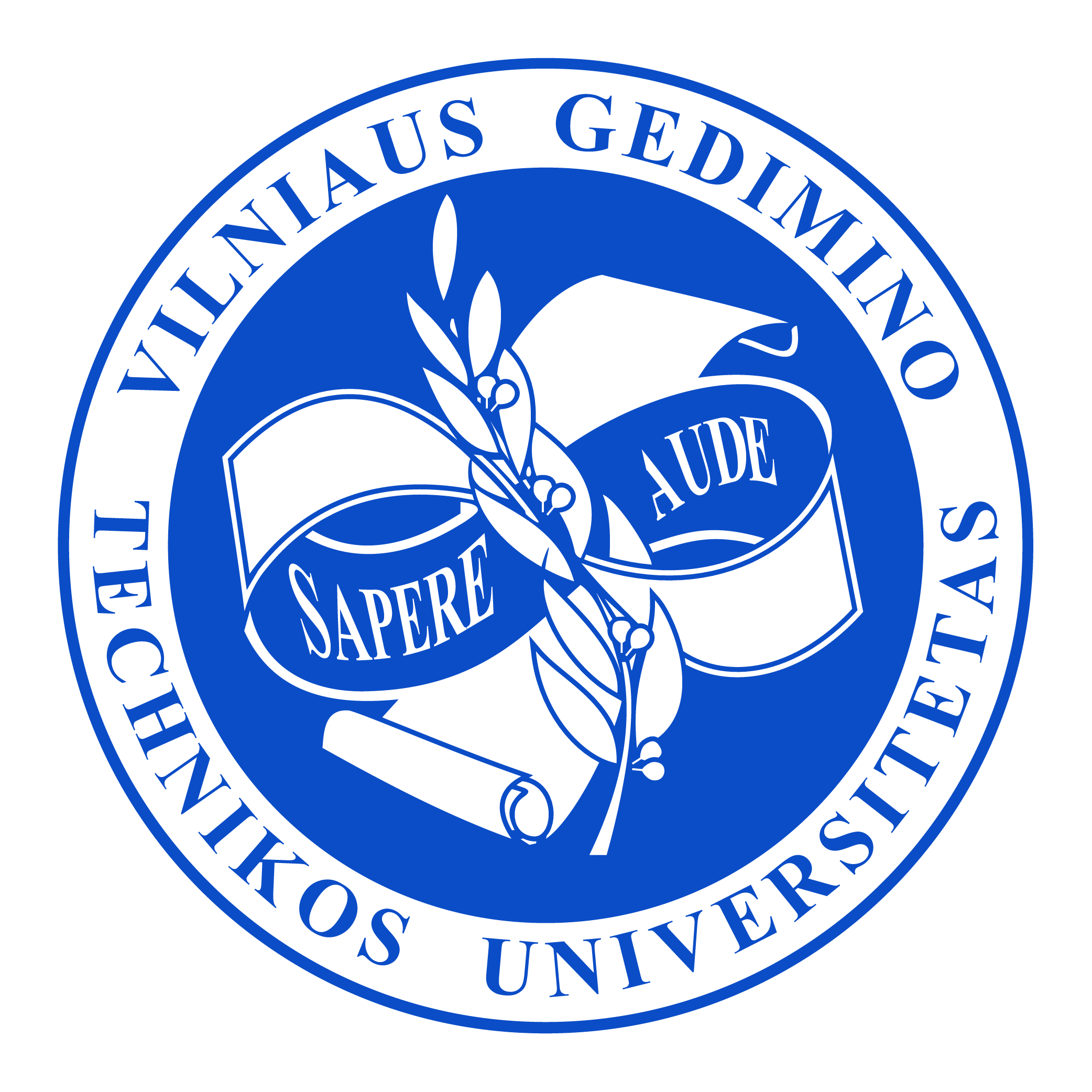
- Motto: Sapere aude (in Latin)
- Type: Public
- Established: 1956; 70 years ago
- Rector: Romualdas Kliukas
- Faculty: 940
- Students: 11,000
- Location: Vilnius, Lithuania
- Campus: Urban
- Website: vilniustech.lt
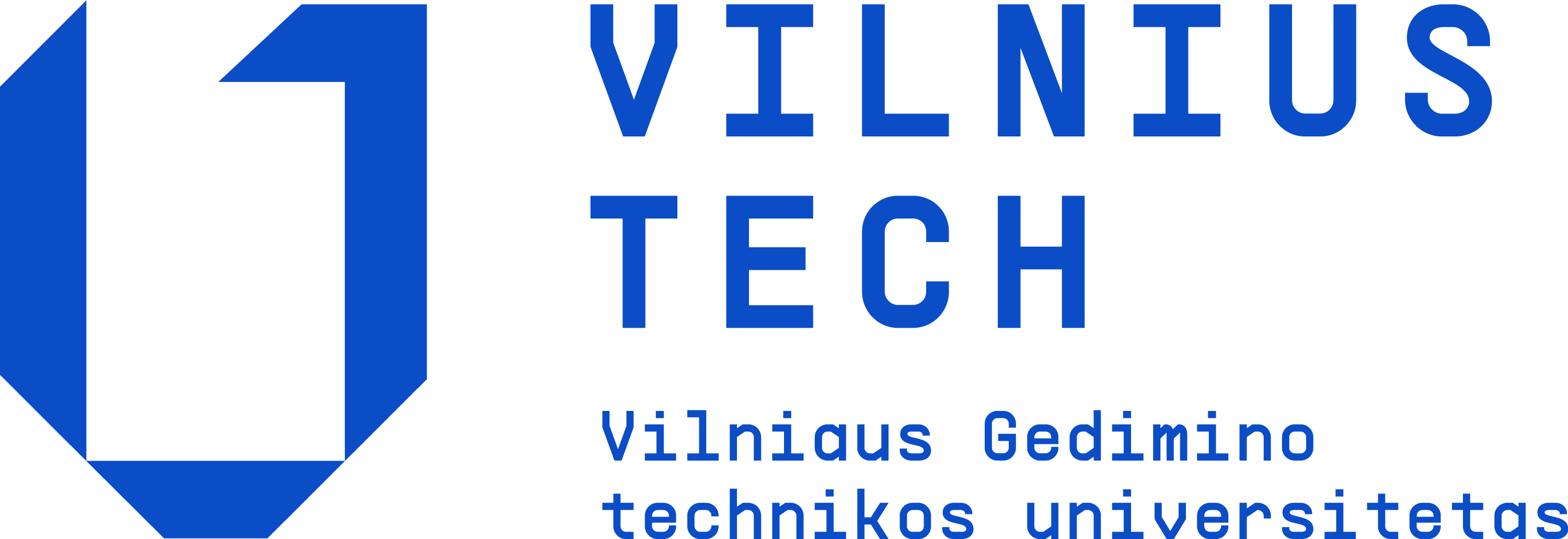

University rankings

Global – Overall
- QS World: 851-900 (2026)

Regional – Overall
- QS Emerging Europe and Central Asia: 56 (2022)

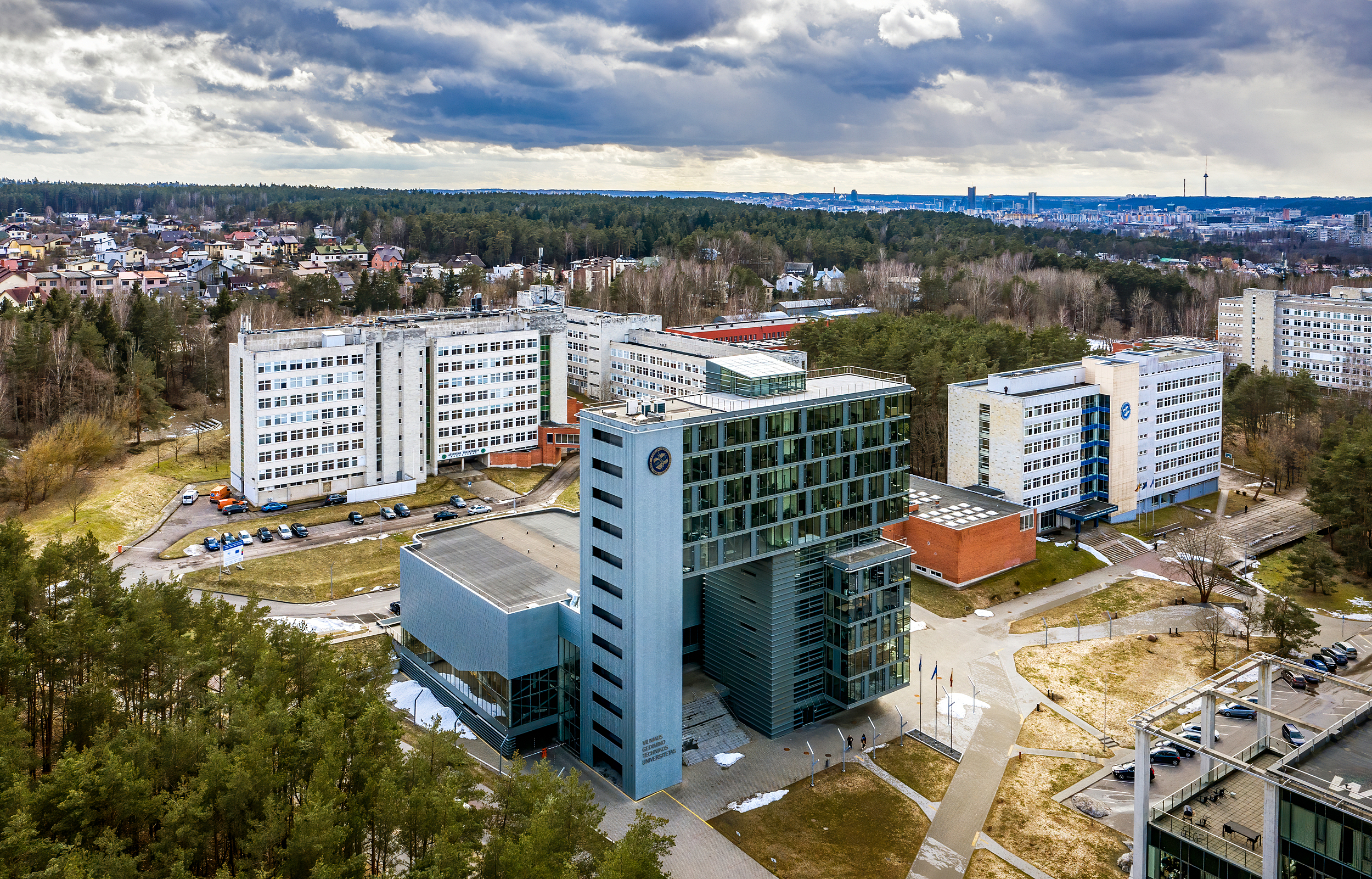
Campus in Saulėtėkis (2021)

Vilnius Gediminas Technical University (VILNIUS TECH) is a public university located in Vilnius, Lithuania. There are 10 faculties including Antanas Gustaitis Aviation Institute, Architecture, Business Management, Civil Engineering, Creative Industries, Electronics, Environmental Engineering, Fundamental Sciences, Mechanics, Transport Engineering. Scientific research and experimental development is performed by 13 institutes, 3 research centres and 23 research laboratories.

VILNIUS TECH is among the top 2.1% of universities in the world and scores highest in Lithuania in the subject areas of Architecture / Built Environment (QS Top 101-150), Business & Management (QS Top 201-250) and Economics & Econometrics (QS Top 301–350) according to QS World University Rankings by subject.

== History ==
Seal of Vilnius Civil Engineering Institute, 1969

VILNIUS TECH was founded on 1 September 1956, when the Vilnius Evening Division of the Kaunas Polytechnic Institute (now Kaunas University of Technology) was established, with Jeronimas Kudaba as the first dean. In 1960, the division was reorganized into the KPI Vilnius Evening Faculty. Aleksandras Čyras was named the Dean of the Faculty, with 500 students. In 1962, the first class of graduates completed their studies. In 1964, the Faculty of Construction Economics was added, followed in 1968 by the Faculty of Urban Construction.

In 1969, the division separated from the Kaunas Polytechnic Institute and became the Vilnius Civil Engineering Institute (Vilniaus inžinerinis statybos institutas), or VISI; Čyras was named the first academic rector. In 1971, the Faculty of Architecture was added, and in 1987 the Faculty of Municipal Economy was established.

After the Re-Establishment of the State of Lithuania in 1990, the Supreme Council of the Republic of Lithuania decided to change the VISI into the Vilnius Technical University (VTU), with Edmundas Kazimieras Zavadskas as rector. After the statute of VTU was adopted in 1991, the Supreme Council approved it on 2 July 1992. VTU moved more toward a Western European university structure and featured faculties of architecture, construction, engineering communications, mechanics, and electronics.

The following year, in 1993, VTU established the Aviation Institute and two more faculties, one in business management and one in fundamental sciences, along with the Faculty of Transport Engineering the following year.

On 22 August 1996, the Lithuanian Government awarded the honorary of the 14th-century Grand Duke of Lithuania Gediminas's name to VTU, and the university became known as Vilnius Gediminas Technical University.

Romualdas Ginevičius was elected rector by the VILNIUS TECH Senate in 2002. With the 2009 Law on Higher Education and Research, the Seimas of the Lithuanian Republic ordered all state-funded universities to reorganize into nonprofit organizations (Viešosios įstaigos) tasked with working in the public interest by 2011. VILNIUS TECH met this requirement in 2011.

== Campus ==
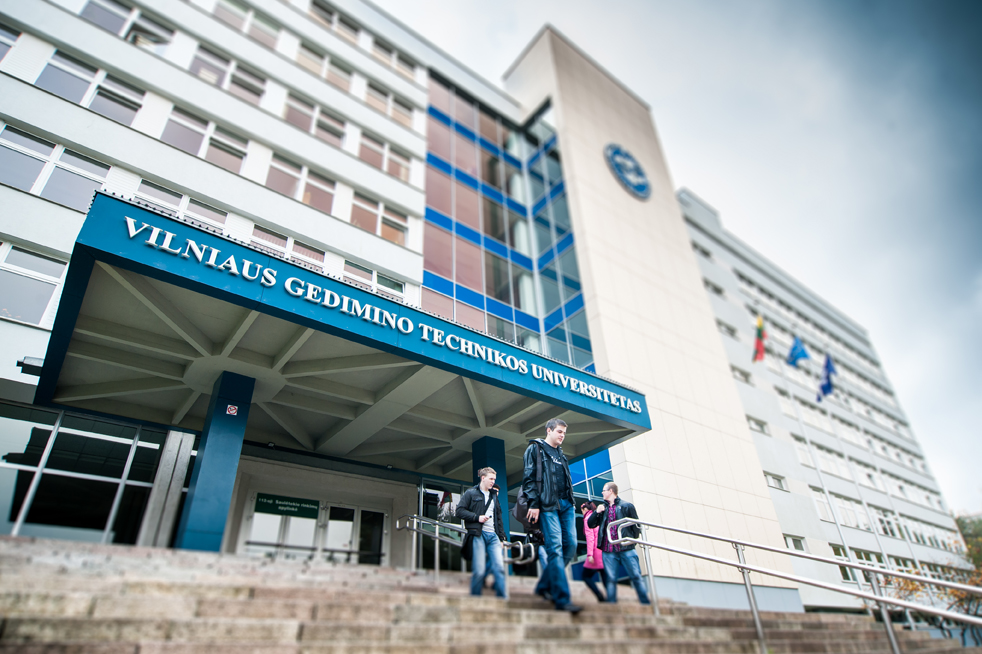
The building of VILNIUS TECH Faculties of Civil Engineering and Business Management in the Saulėtekis neighborhood of Vilnius.

The VILNIUS TECH campus is spread across Vilnius, with the main buildings in the wooded Saulėtekis neighborhood of the Antakalnis eldership, not far from many of Vilnius University's faculties as well as Mykolas Romeris University and the European Humanities University. The future plans of the university involve expanding the Saulėtekis campus.

=== Saulėtekis ===
The Saulėtekis campus is the main university campus. It houses the university's administration offices as well as the Faculties of Environmental Engineering, Fundamental Sciences, Civil Engineering and Business Management. The VILNIUS TECH library, which has over 100,000 distinct titles, is located nearby at Saulėtekio al. 14. The two primary VILNIUS TECH dormitories are also on Saulėtekio al., at numbers 39 A and 25. The Saulėtekis campus is accessible from the Vilnius city center by the 2, 10, and 14 Vilnius trolleybuses. It is also served by the 4G and 5G express buses, 18 and 38 buses, and 19 and 21 trolleybuses.

=== Vilnius Old Town ===
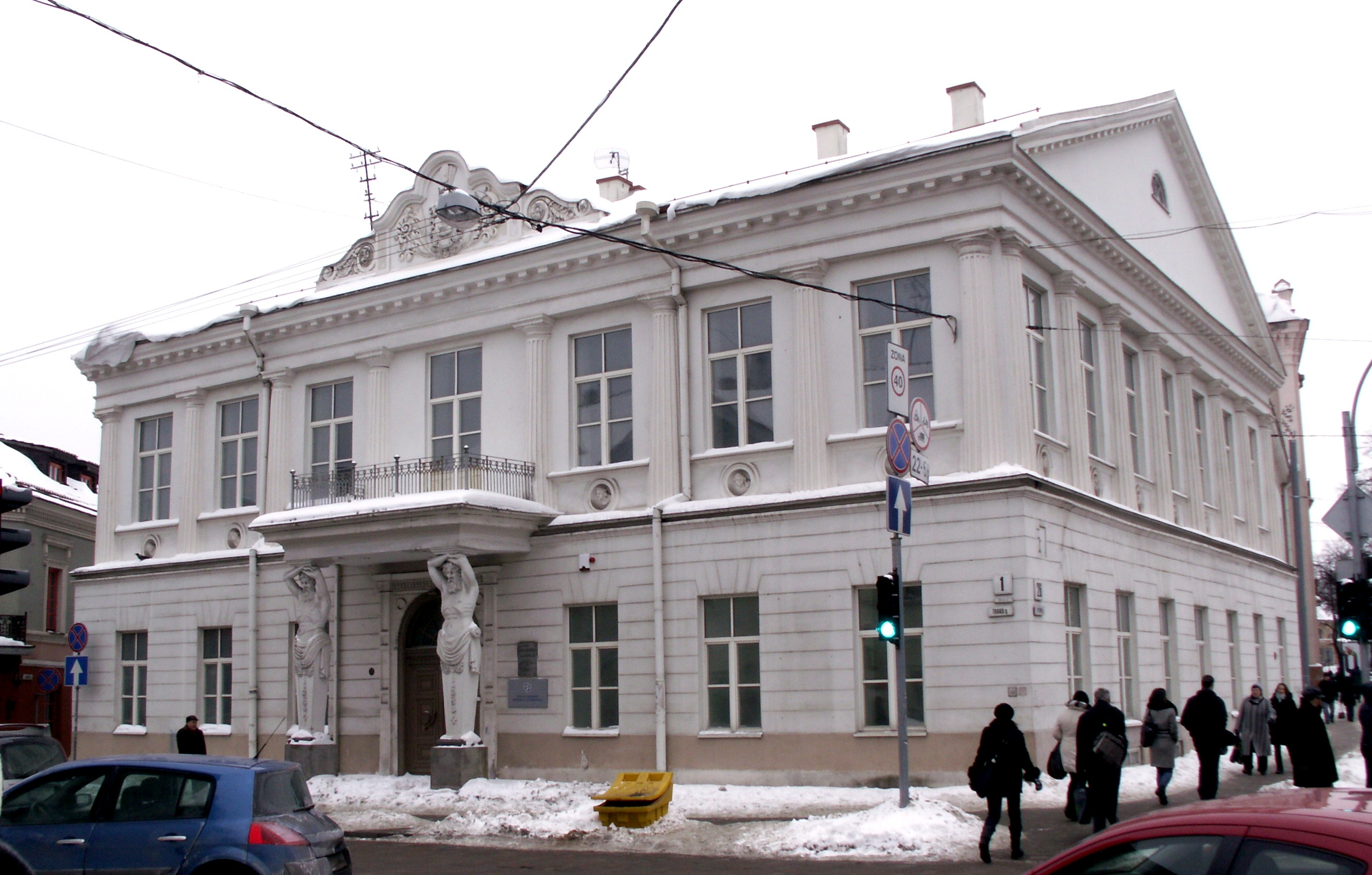
The Tyszkiewicz Palace in Vilnius Old Town that now houses the Faculties of Architecture and Creative Industries.

The Faculties of Architecture and Creative Industries are located at Pylimo g. 26/1 in Vilnius Old Town, in a complex which includes a historical manor belonging to the House of Tyszkiewicz. The building is also the home of the VILNIUS TECH bookstore Technika. The campus is located right in the city center, just off the Trakų stop, which connects with the Vilnius Train Station via the 1G express bus; 53 bus; and 1, 2, 7, and 20 trolleybuses.

=== Naujamiestis ===
The Naujamiestis eldership of Vilnius, also located in the city center, houses several faculties in two buildings. The Faculties of Mechanics and Transport Engineering are established at Basanavičiaus g. 28, while the Faculty of Electronics is located at Naugarduko g. 41. The former is across the street from the Algirdo stop, which connects several crosstown trolleybus lines, including the 14, which goes all the way to the Saulėtekis campus. The latter is near the Vytenio stop, which is served by the 73 bus, connecting northwestern and southwestern Vilnius neighborhoods.

=== Naujininkai ===
The Antanas Gustaitis Aviation Institute is located near the Vilnius International Airport in the Naujininkai eldership in the southern part of Vilnius at Rodūnios kelias 30. It is near the Oro uostas stop, which is served by the 3G express bus as well as the 1, 2, and 88 buses, which connect the airport to the city center.

== Academics ==
University rankings

Global – Overall
- QS World: 801–850 (2024)
- THE World: 1201–1500 (2024)
- USNWR Global: =1498 (2023)

=== Antanas Gustaitis Aviation Institute ===
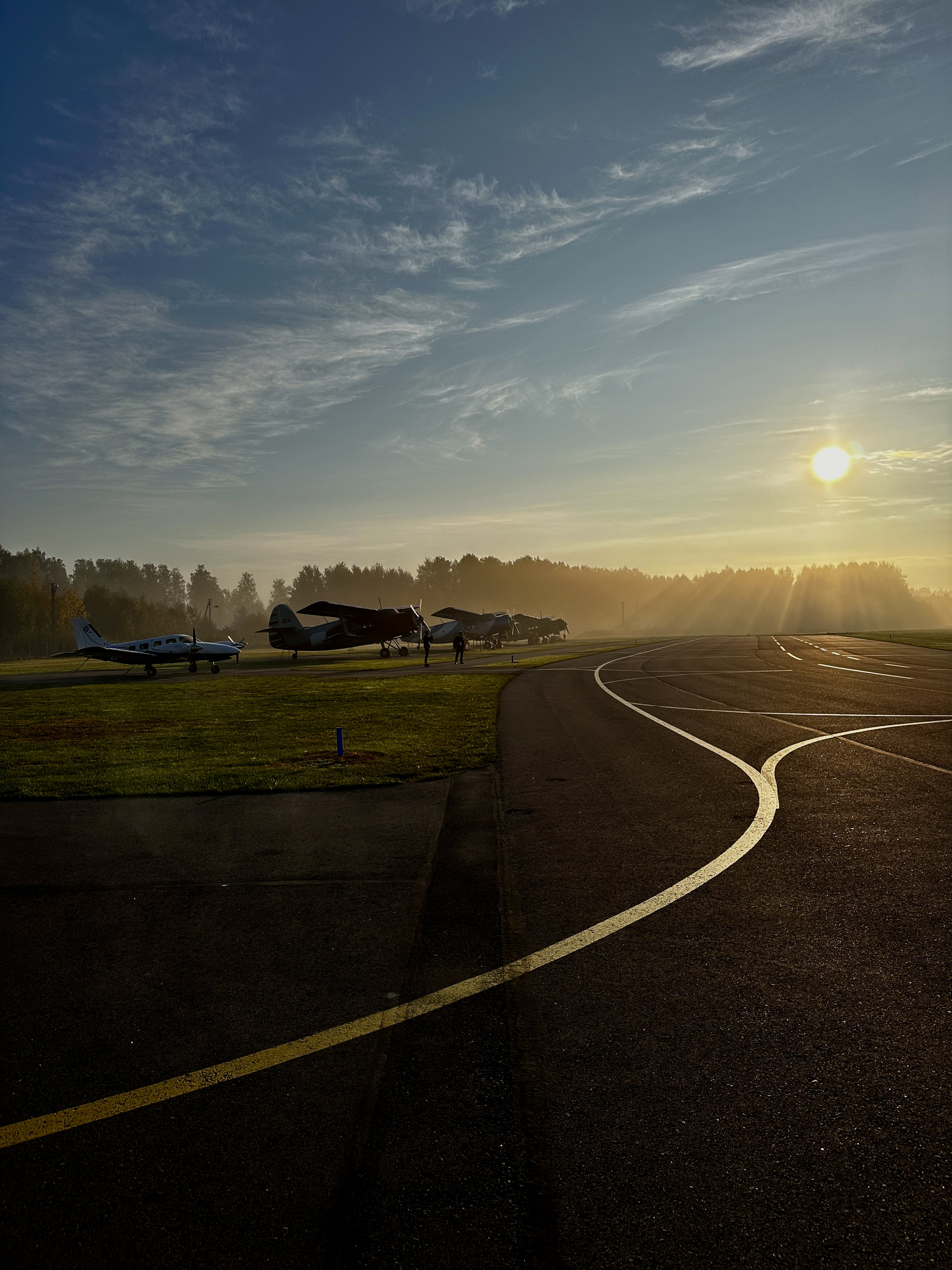
Flight training is conducted at Kyviskes Airfield, about 15 km from Vilnius

The Antanas Gustaitis Aviation Institute, named after Lithuanian aviation pioneer Antanas Gustaitis, was founded in 1993 and is an Approved Training Organisation. It trains pilots, air traffic controllers, aviation engineers and others involved in aviation. The Departments of Aviation Technologies, Aviation Mechanics, and Avionics provide theoretical training for the students, while the Flight Training Unit, Air Traffic Control Unit, and Aviation Engineering Practical Training Depot provide practical training. The integrated (five-year) program in aircraft piloting is offered completely in English.

=== Faculty of Environmental Engineering ===
The Faculty of Environmental Engineering was founded in 1968. Currently, it is made up of seven departments, two research institutes, and three laboratories. The faculty includes 149 instructors including 21 full professors. It offers nine bachelor's degree programs and 14 master's degree programs. The bachelor's program in building energetics is available completely in English, as is the master's program in environmental management and clean production.

=== Faculty of Architecture ===
The Faculty of Architecture began in Kaunas as a part of Vytautas Magnus University before becoming a part of the Kaunas Polytechnic Institute. The faculty joined what is now known as VILNIUS TECH in 1971. It is the largest school of architecture in Lithuania and has over 500 students spread across bachelor's, master's, and doctoral studies. The bachelor's program is available completely in English.

=== Faculty of Business and Management ===
Founded in 1993, the Faculty of Business and Management currently has six departments. It offers bachelor's programs in English in the fields of business management and economics engineering. English language master's degrees are available in the fields of business management, international business, real estate management, and sustainable real estate management. The last two are joint degrees with the Belarusian State Technological University and the Kaliningrad State Technical University, respectively.

=== Faculty of Civil Engineering ===
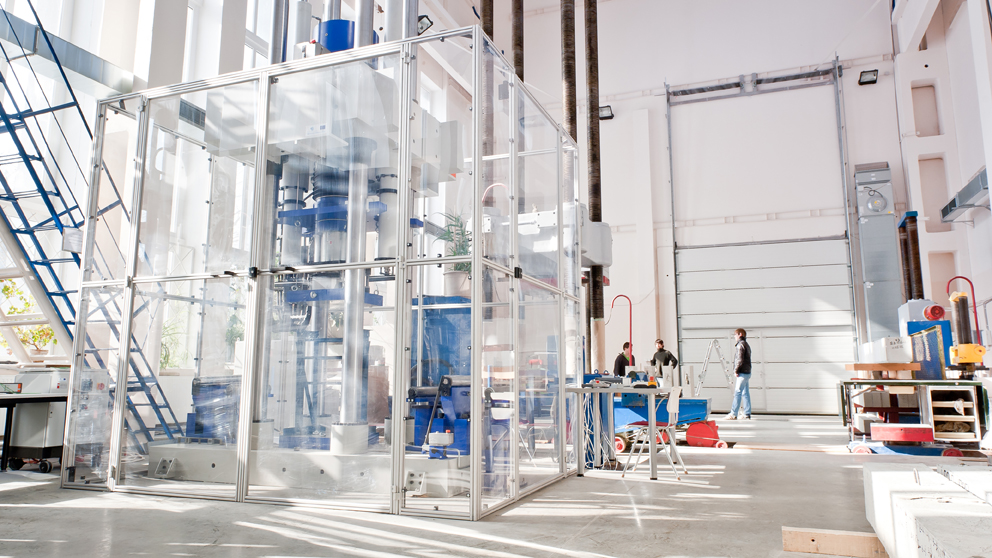
Faculty of Civil Engineering research center

The Faculty of Civil Engineering began in 1920 at Vytautas Magnus University. In 1969, it moved to what is now VILNIUS TECH. The faculty is the largest body at VILNIUS TECH and is the center of the university. It has ten departments and nine other research subdivisions, including laboratories and research institutes. A civil engineering bachelor's program is available in English, as is an innovative road and bridge engineering joint master's degree offered with Riga Technical University.

=== Faculty of Creative Industries ===
The Faculty of Creative Industries is the newest faculty at VILNIUS TECH. In addition to providing a lot of the general education lectures in social sciences and the humanities as well as foreign language instruction, the faculty has two bachelor's degree programs and one master's degree program. The two bachelor's degree programs are in creative industries and entertainment industries, while the master's degree is in creative communication. Currently, none of the degree programs are available entirely in English, but two semesters of the creative industries bachelor's degree is offered in English.

=== Faculty of Electronics ===
The Faculty of Electronics traces its history to 1961, though it became a full-time department of what would become VILNIUS TECH only in 1987. It is split into five departments: automation, electrical engineering, electronic systems, computer engineering, and telecommunications engineering. It offers study programs at the bachelor's, master's, and doctoral levels. Bachelor's programs in computer engineering and telecommunications engineering, as well as a master's program in electrical energetics systems engineering are all available in English.

=== Faculty of Fundamental Sciences ===
The Faculty of Fundamental Sciences was founded in 1993 to provide general education in fundamental science to students in various degree programs. The faculty has expanded to ten departments: information systems, information technologies, graphical systems, chemistry and bioengineering, physics, engineering graphics, mathematical modeling, mathematical statistics, strength of materials, and theoretical mechanics. It offers degree programs at the bachelor's, master's, and doctoral levels. Bachelor's degrees in information systems engineering and engineering informatics are offered in English.

=== Faculty of Mechanics ===
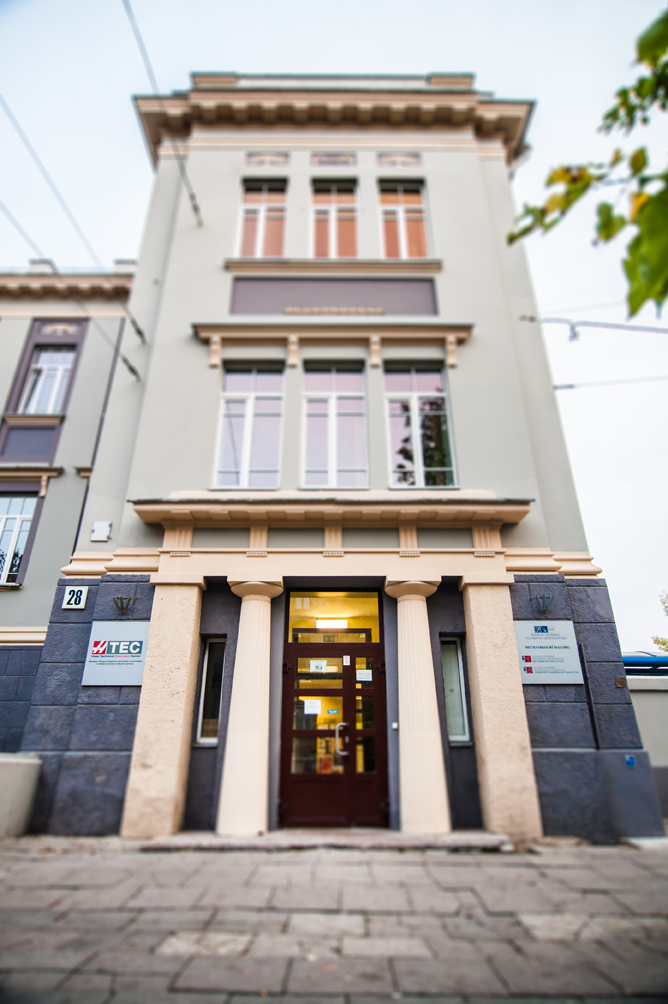
Faculty of Mechanics

The Faculty of Mechanics is one of the oldest in the university, having been founded in 1956. It is made up of five departments, mechanical engineering, biomechanics, materials science and welding, mechatronics and robotics, and printing machines; and three research subdivisions, the Welding Research and Diagnostics Scientific Laboratory, the Research Laboratory of Vibroacoustics and Diagnostics, and the Institute of Mechanical Science. Study programs in English include the bachelor's programs in mechanics engineering and in mechatronics and robotics. The faculty also offers a joint master's degree program in mechatronics with the Braunschweig University of Technology.

=== Faculty of Transport Engineering ===
The Faculty of Transport Engineering was founded in 1994. It is made up of four departments and three research subunits. It publishes the scholarly journal Transport.

=== Other Research Bodies ===
VILNIUS TECH has two research centers, the university-wide, interdisciplinary Civil Engineering Research Center, and the Competence Center of Intermodal Transport and Logistics, attached to the Faculty of Transport Engineering.

The university also boasts 14 research institutes. The interdisciplinary Scientific Institute of Thermal Insulation investigates means of creating building materials that insulate both heat and sound. At the faculty level, the Research Institutes of Smart Building Technologies, the Research Institute of Building Structures, and the Research Institute of Building Materials and Products all belong to the Faculty of Civil Engineering. The Research Institutes of Environmental Protection, the Road Research Institute, the Research Institute of Territorial Planning, and the Research Institute of Geodesy belong to the Faculty of Environmental Engineering. The Transport Research Institute belongs to the Faculty of Transport Engineering. The Institute of Applied Computer Science belongs to the Faculty of Fundamental Sciences. The Institute of Mechanical Science belongs to the Faculty of Mechanics. The Institute of Architecture belongs to the Faculty of Architecture. Finally, the Research Institute for Telecommunications and the Institute of High Magnetic Fields belong to the Faculty of Electronics.

At the university level, VILNIUS TECH has 12 research laboratories. Four are related to the Scientific Institute of Thermal Insulation, and 8 belong to the Civil Engineering Research Center. Scattered throughout the rest of the university are 21 other research laboratories at both the faculty and department levels.

== Administration ==
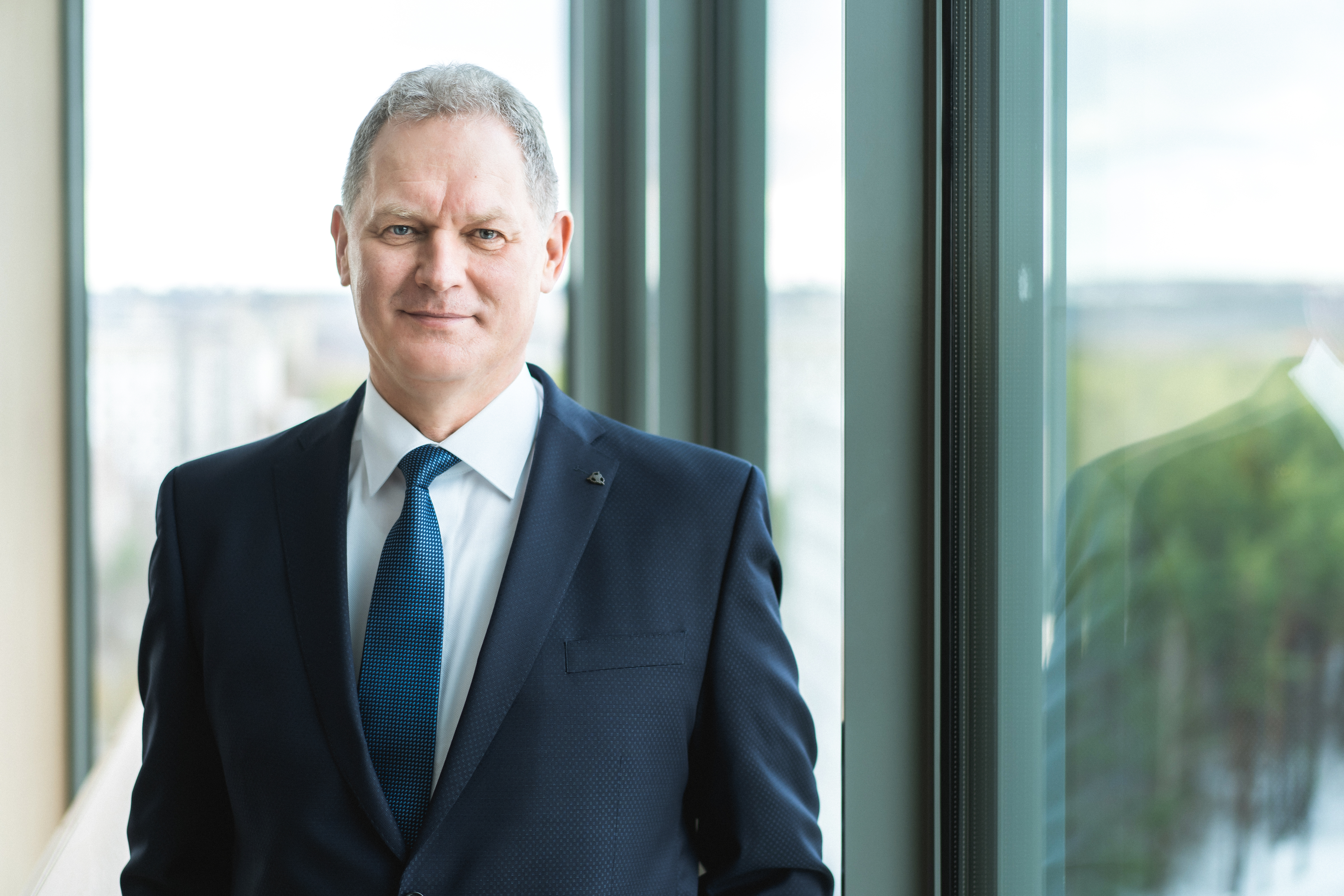
The 5th Rector of VILNIUS TECH, Romualdas Kliukas

Since 2021, the Rector of VILNIUS TECH is Romualdas Kliukas. He succeeded the third rector of the university, Adolfas Daniūnas, who had been rector since 2011. The first rector of the university was Aleksandras Čyras, who headed the university from its formal establishment in 1969 to 1990. He was succeeded by Edmundas Zavadskas.

The Rectorate is made up of a Vice-Rector for International Relations, a Vice-Rector for Strategic Development, a Vice-Rector for Research, a Vice-Rector for Studies, and a Chancellor. The current chancellor is Vaidotas Trinkūnas.

== Research Publication ==
The Vilnius Gediminas Technical University Press (VILNIUS TECH Press) publishes around 100 publications annually. In 2010, VILNISU TECH Press was the first press in Lithuania to launch an e-books site for their publications.

VILNIUS TECH Press also publishes 19 peer-reviewed research journals. Of these journals, eight are indexed on the Web of Science database, while all of the journals are indexed by ProQuest and EBSCO. Taylor and Francis publishes 10 of the academic journals.

Six of VILNIUS TECH Press's journals are published open access with a Creative Commons CC BY-NC 4.0 license: Business: Theory and Practice, Coactivity: Philosophy, Communication, Coactivity: Philology, Educology, Science — Future of Lithuania, Business, Management and Education, and Aviation technologies.

== Student Activities ==
VILNIUS TECH offers several extracurricular activities for its students, including the choir Gabija, the theater group Palėpė, and the Lithuanian folk dance group Vingis.

The VILNIUS TECH student representatives organization features 300 volunteers who act as liaisons between the university and the student body. Similarly, the international ERASMUS students are served by the VILNIUS TECH chapter of the Erasmus Student Network.

== International cooperation ==
In 2023, Antanas Gustaitis Aviation Institute of VILNIUS TECH joined the international PEGASUS network of aerospace engineering universities.

== Alumni ==
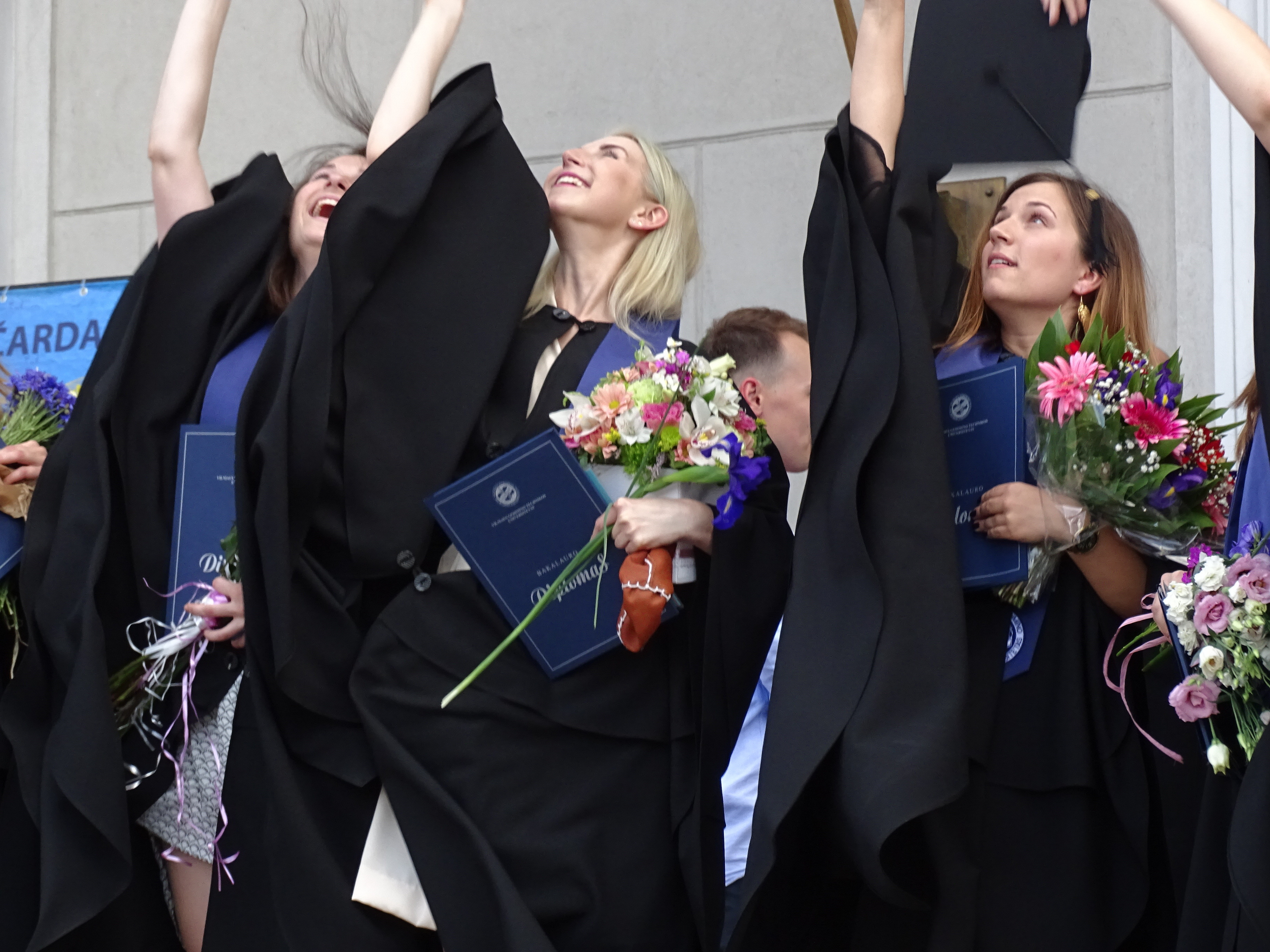
VGTU graduation ceremony

The Vilnius Civil Engineering Institute (VISI), as VILNIUS TECH was known until the re-establishment of the Republic of Lithuania, has produced many high-profile alumni in Lithuania.

Several current politicians, for example, are VISI graduates. Algirdas Butkevičius, the 12th Prime Minister of Lithuania, completed the economics engineering program. Rolandas Paksas, a former President of Lithuania and two-time prime minister, also graduated from VISI. Former Speaker of the Seimas Viktoras Muntianas, Member of the European Parliament Valdemar Tomaševski, and former Prime Minister and Signatory of the Act of the Re-Establishment of the State of Lithuania Gediminas Vagnorius are all also VISI alumni.

In the creative arts, composer and rock pioneer Kęstutis Antanėlis and musician Andrius Mamontovas attended the university. In 1971, Antanėlis staged a production of Jesus Christ Superstar at the Vilnius Art Academy, only the second production of the show in the world, and was expelled from VISI in response. Mamontovas, on the other hand, felt pressure from his father to study a "serious" subject, like engineering. After his time in the Soviet Army, however, Mamontovas reconsidered and left VISI to study journalism at Vilnius University.
