= Jonava Air Base =

Jonava Airport Jonavos aerodromas
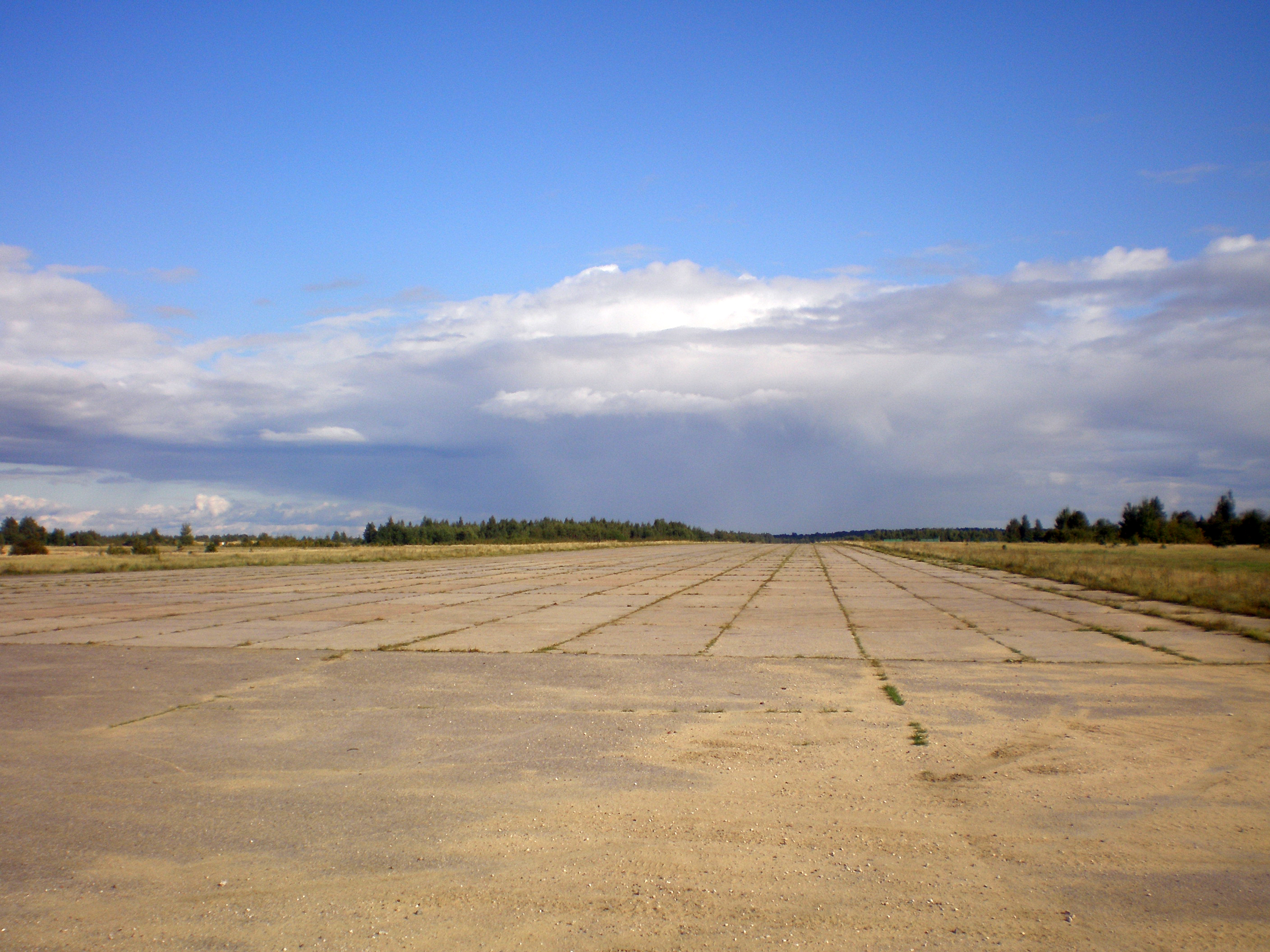
- IATA: none; ICAO: EYRU

Summary
- Airport type: Military
- Serves: Jonava, Lithuania
- Elevation AMSL: 246 ft / 75 m
- Coordinates: 55°00′36″N 024°21′48″E
- Interactive map of Jonava Airport

Runways
Direction	Length		Surface
Direction	m	ft	Surface
12/30	2,400	7,874	Concrete

Jonava Airport also known as Rukla or Gaižiūnai Airfield (Lithuanian: Jonavos aerodromas; ICAO: EYRU) was a military airfield in Lithuania located 9 km (5.6 mi) southeast of Jonava. It was part of Rukla–Gaižiūnai military facilities. The airport featured a linear ramp with 24 parking spaces. It is no longer used as an airfield and hosts various racing events.

== Airlines and destinations ==
There are currently no scheduled passenger or cargo services to/from Jonava Airport.
