= Gaižiūnai =

- Village
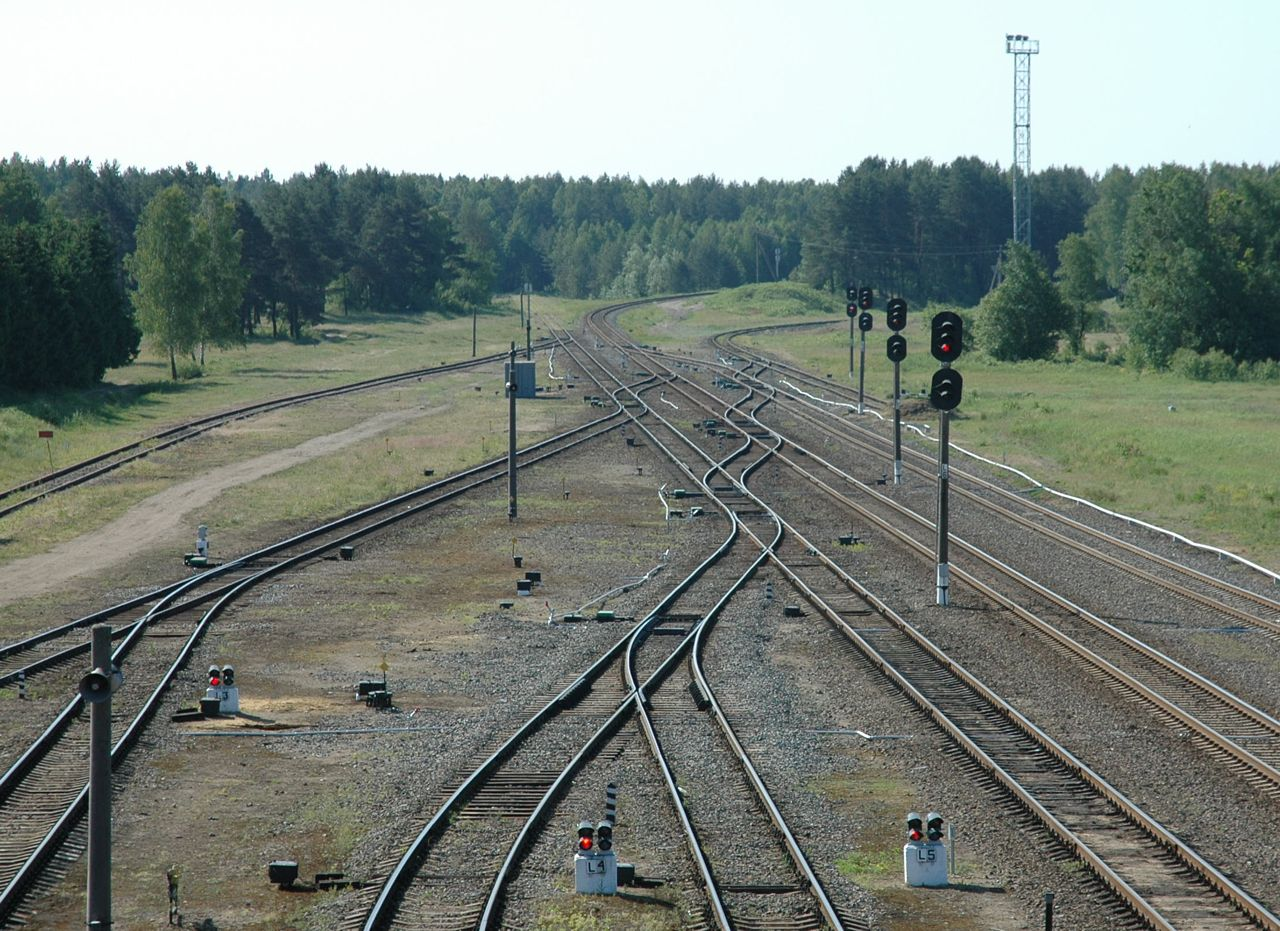
- Railway from the pedestrian bridge in Gaižiūnai

- Location of Gaižiūnai
- Coordinates: 55°02′10″N 24°19′50″E
- Country: Lithuania
- Ethnographic region: Aukštaitija
- County: Kaunas County
- Municipality: Jonava district municipality
- Eldership: Dumsiai eldership
- First mentioned: 1604

Population (2011)
  - Total: 167
- Time zone: UTC+2 (EET)
  - Summer (DST): UTC+3 (EEST)

Gaižiūnai is a village in Jonava district municipality, Lithuania. It is situated on the Taurosta River, tributary of Neris, about 3 km (1.9 mi) southeast of Jonava and 25 km (16 mi) northeast of Kaunas. The railroad from Šiauliai forks into Kaunas and Vilnius near the village. Gaižiūnai is also known as a military base.

== Military base ==
The old military training ground in Varėna could not be used by the Lithuanian Army as it was too close to the demarcation line with Poland and stirred Polish protests. Therefore in 1930 the army bought some 80 km^{2} (31 sq mi) of land, mostly pine forest, bog, and sandy soil unsuitable for agriculture. The new training grounds included an airfield, railway connection, and numerous buildings for the soldiers. In 1939, according to the Soviet–Lithuanian Mutual Assistance Treaty, about 5,000 Russian soldiers were stationed in the military base. After World War II, the Soviets expanded the base and built a military townlet in Rukla. When Lithuania regained its independence, the base was adopted by the Lithuanian Armed Forces. The facility is known as Gaižiūnai Training Area (Lithuanian: Gaižiūnų poligonas).

== See also ==
- Pabradė
- Rukla
