= Klaipėda Airfield =

Coordinates: 55°42′43″N 021°14′34″E

Klaipėda Airfield Klaipėdos oro uostas
- IATA: QRK; ICAO: EYKL

Summary
- Airport type: Private
- Operator: UAB "Klaipėdos aerouostas"
- Serves: Klaipėda, Lithuania
- Elevation AMSL: 59 ft (18 m)
- Interactive map of Klaipėda Airfield

Runways
| Direction | Length | | Surface |
| Direction | m | ft | Surface |
|---|---|---|---|
| 07/25 | 500 | 1,640 | Asphalt |
| 06/24 | 590 | 1,935 | Grass |
- Sources: Airport, CAA Lithuania

Klaipėda Airfield (ICAO: EYKL, formerly also IATA: QRK) is a privately run aerodrome with a focus on sports aviation and charter services. It is located 7 kilometers (4.3 mi) east of Klaipėda in the western part of Lithuania, near the A1/E85 highway.

The field has two runways, parallel and adjacent: one with an asphalt concrete pavement measuring 500 x 21 metres, the other a grass surface measuring 590 x 42 metres.

On the North side of the field is a VOR radio navigation beacon.

Scheduled commercial air service for the Klaipėda region is provided at Palanga International Airport, located 30 kilometers (19 mi) north of the city.

== See also ==
- List of airports in Lithuania
- List of the largest airports in the Nordic countries
