= Barysiai =

- Village
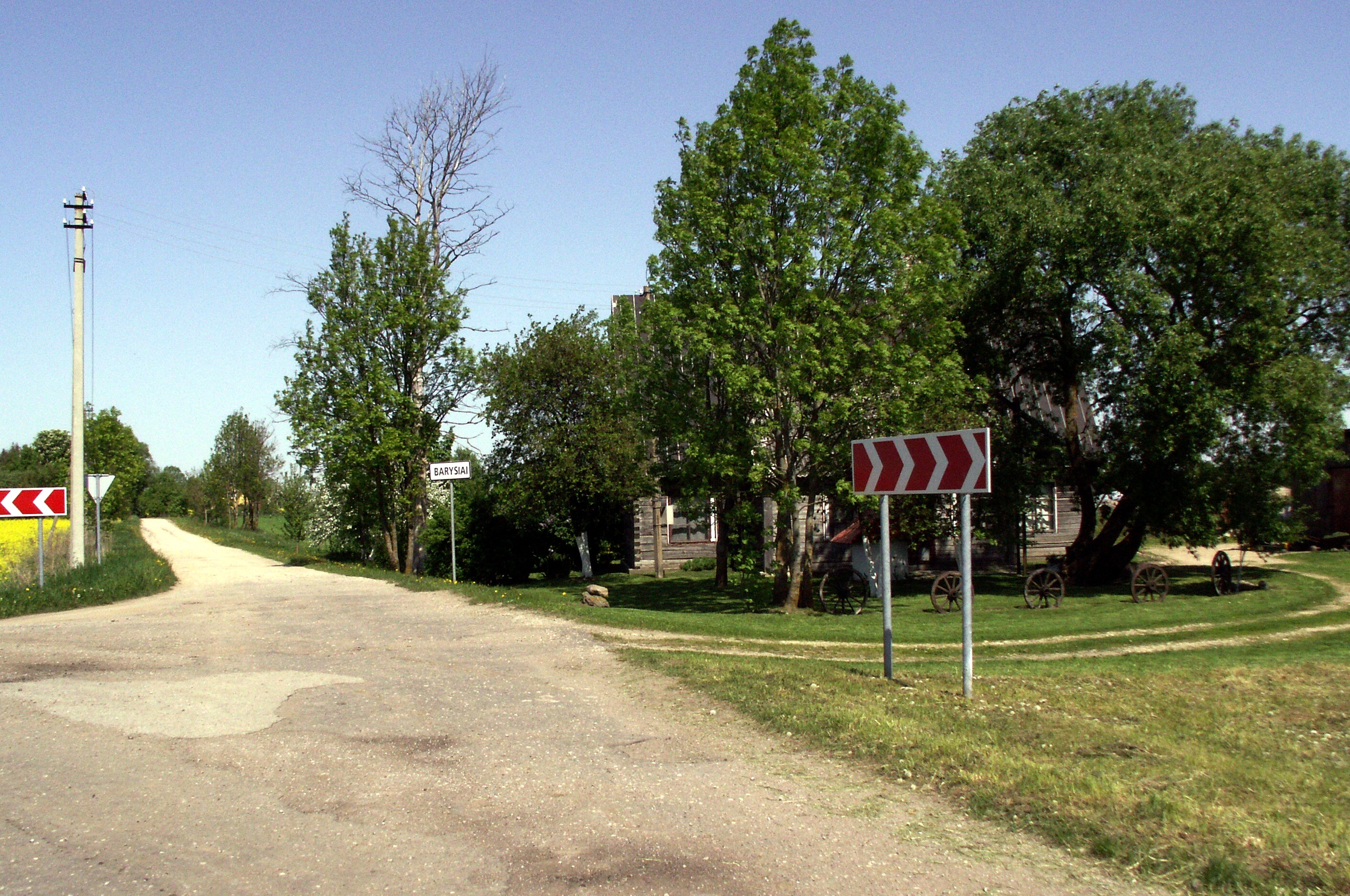

- Location in Lithuania
- Coordinates: 56°04′37″N 23°32′31″E
- Country: Lithuania
- County: Šiauliai
- Municipality: Joniškis
- Eldership: Gataučiai

Population (2011)
  - Total: 12
- Time zone: UTC+2 (EET)
  - Summer (DST): UTC+3 (EEST)

Barysiai (Samogitian: Barīsē) is a village (Lithuanian: kaimas) in the eldership of Gataučiai, in the Joniškis district municipality in Šiauliai County, Lithuania. It is 19 km away from the city of Joniškis and 4 km away from the town of Meškuičiai. According to a 2011 census, 12 people live in Barysiai.

== Gallery ==
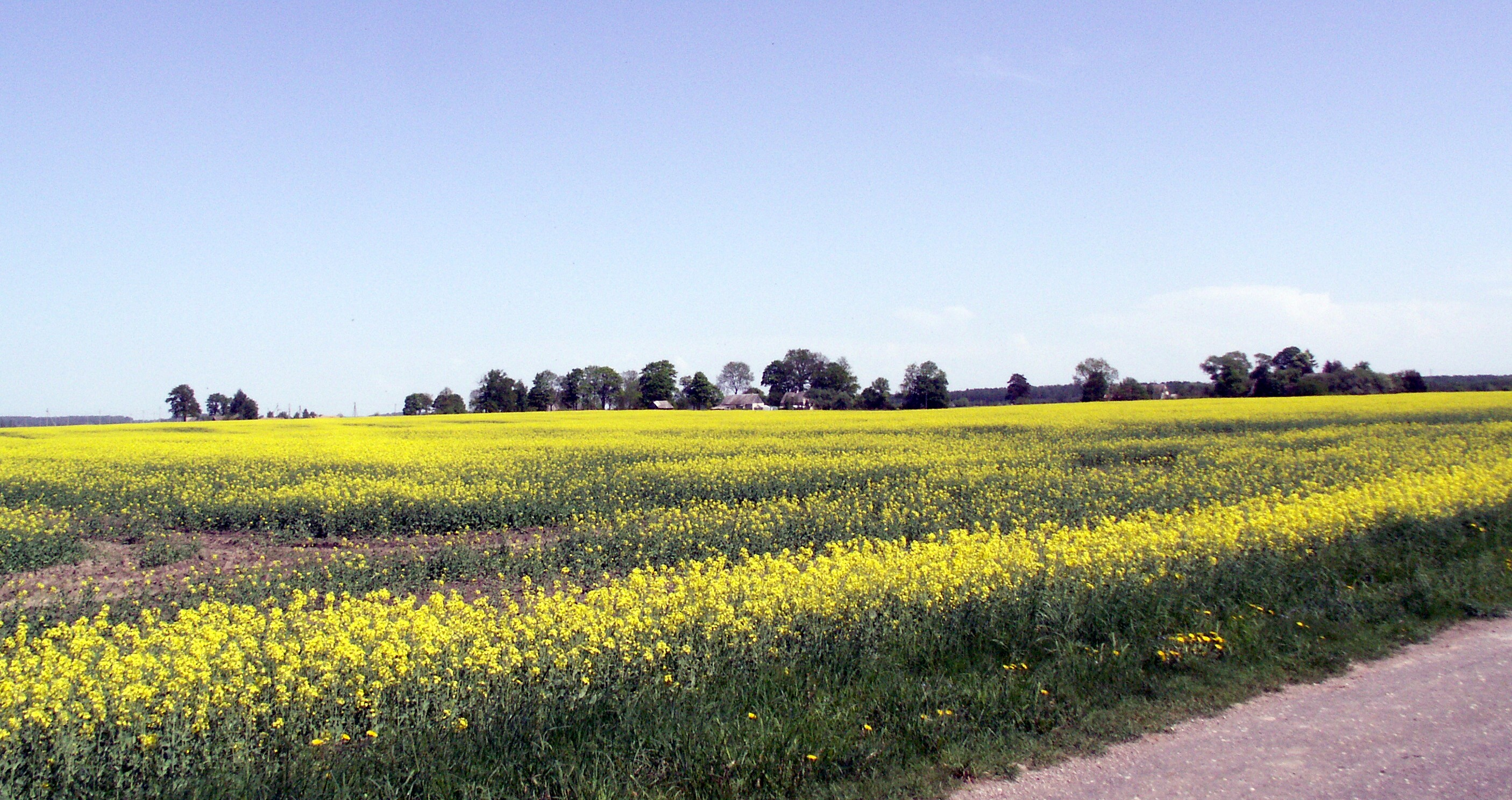
Barysiai

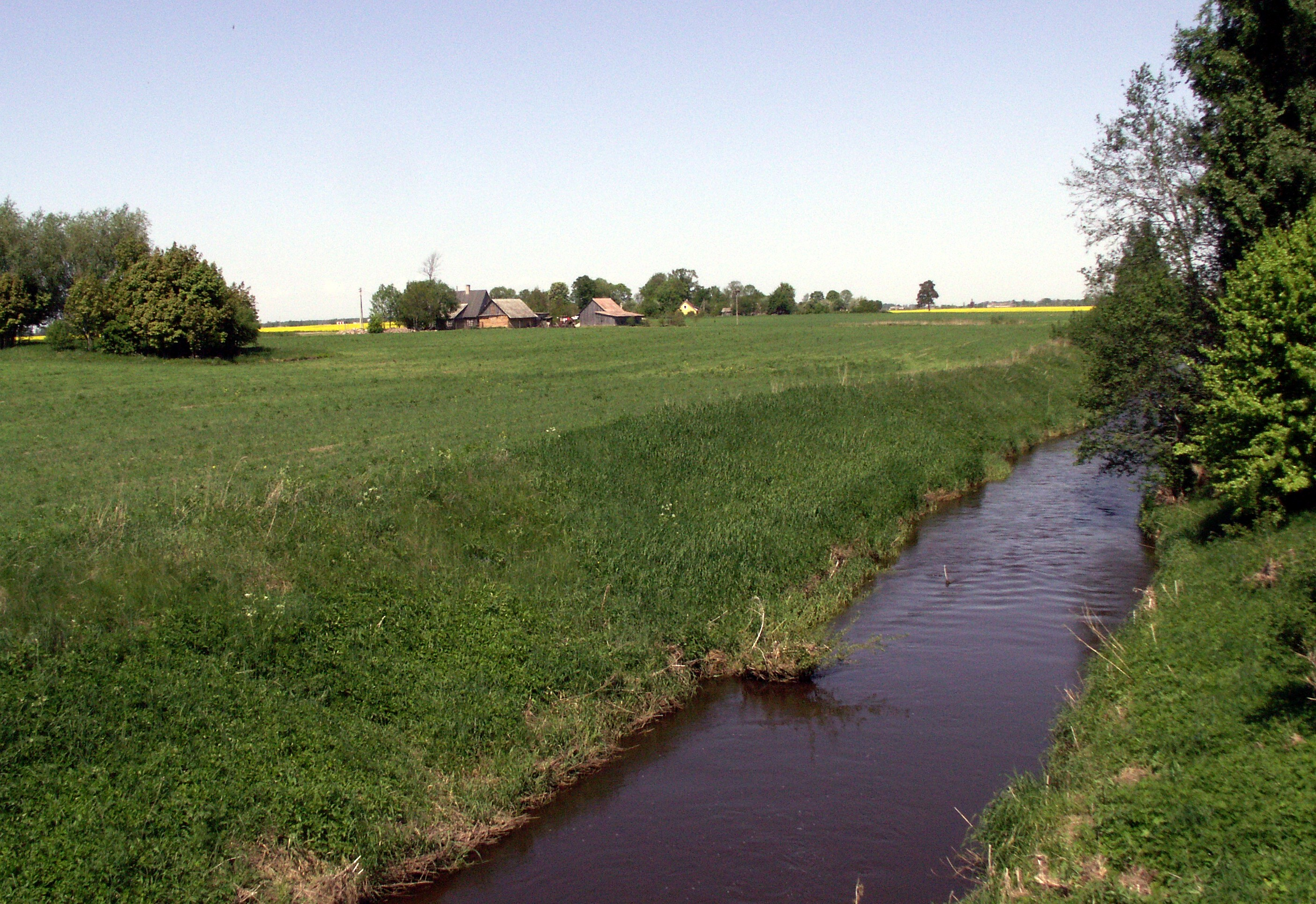
Kulpė river in Barysiai

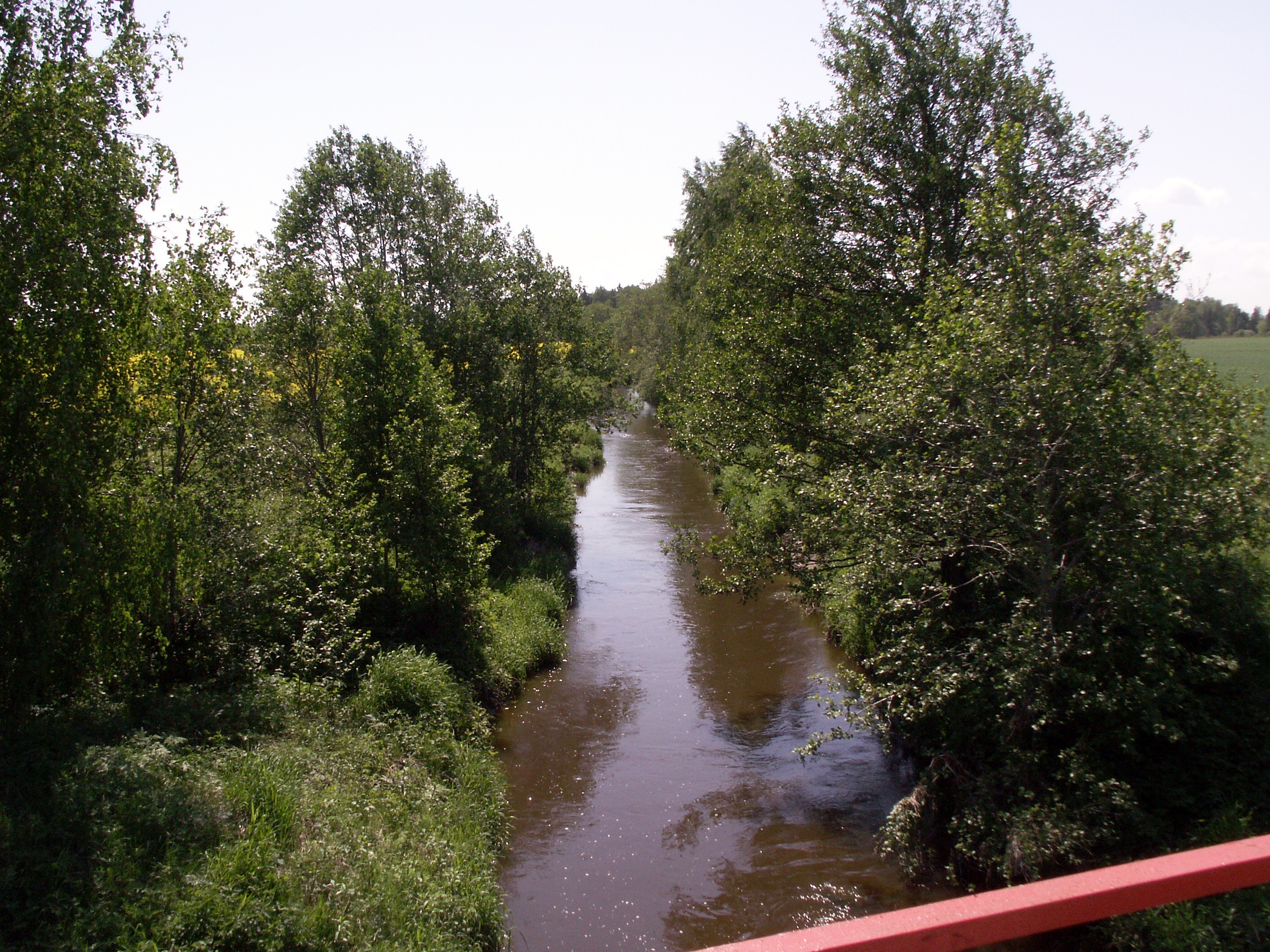
Kulpė river in Barysiai

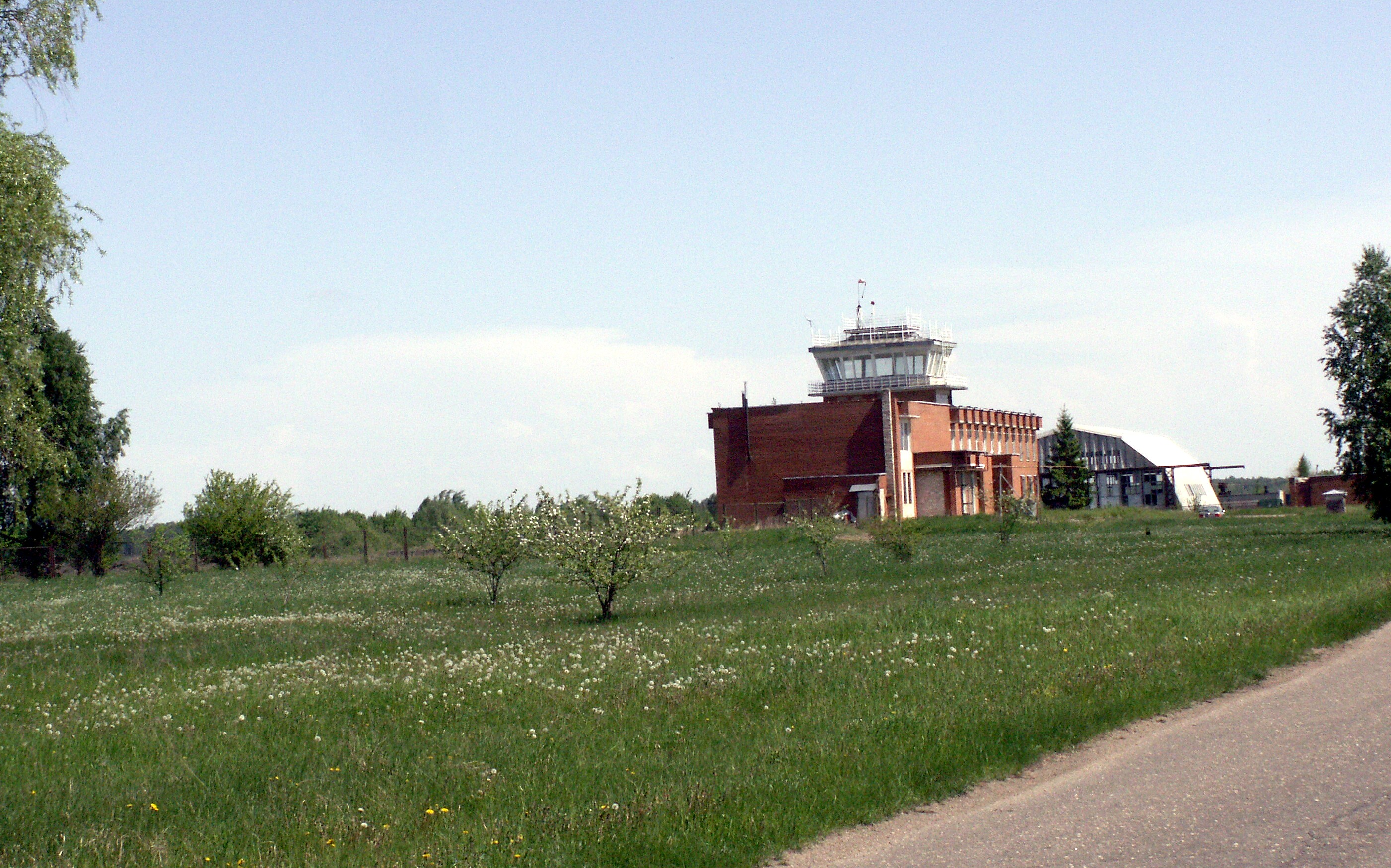
Barysiai Airport
