= Barysiai Airport =

Barysiai Airport Barysių aerodromas
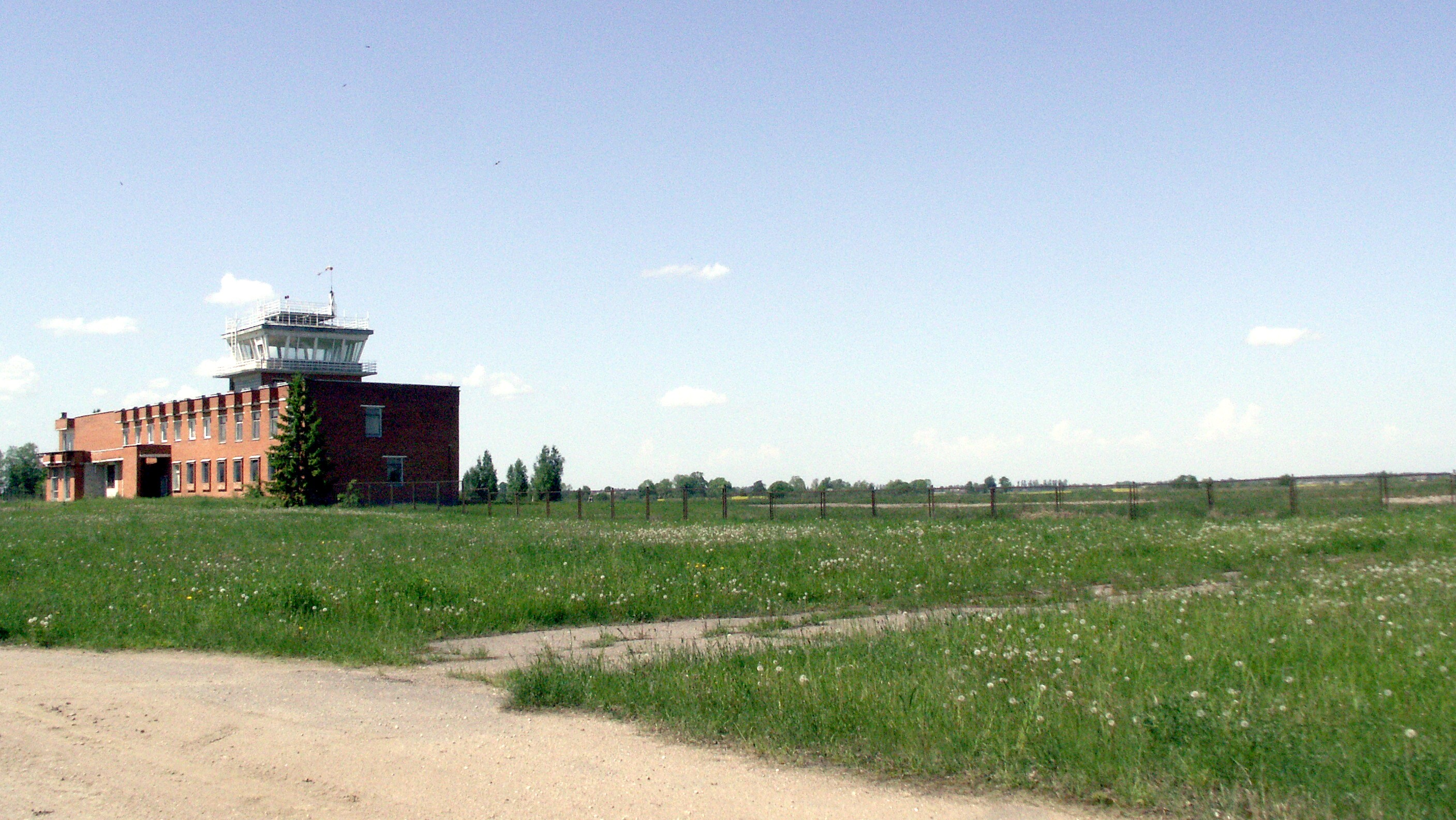
- IATA: HLJ; ICAO: EYSB

Summary
- Airport type: Public
- Serves: Šiauliai, Lithuania
- Location: Barysiai, Lithuania
- Elevation AMSL: 270 ft (82 m)
- Coordinates: 56°04′14″N 023°33′29″E

Map
- Location of airport in Lithuania

Runways
| Direction | Length | | Surface |
| Direction | m | ft | Surface |
|---|---|---|---|
| 10/28 | 1,000 | 3,281 | Asphalt |

Barysiai Airport (Lithuanian: Barysių aerodromas) (ICAO: EYSB) is an airport in Barysiai, a village in the Joniškis district municipality of Šiauliai County in northern Lithuania. From 1959 to 1992 it was a civil airport serving the city of Šiauliai.

== Facilities ==
The airport resides at an elevation of 270 feet (82 m) above mean sea level. It has one runway designated 10/28 with an asphalt surface measuring 1,000 by 30 metres (3,281 ft × 98 ft).

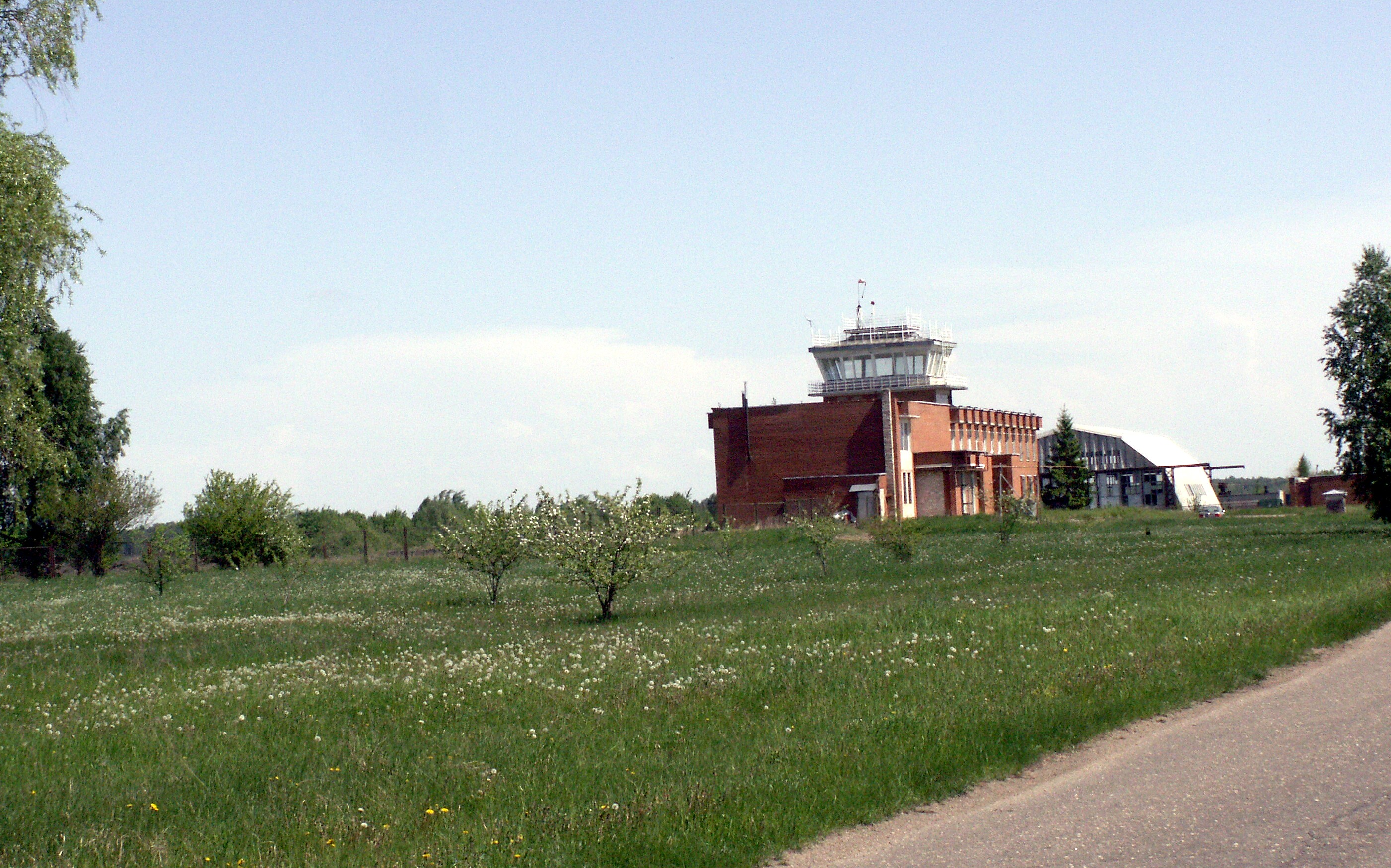

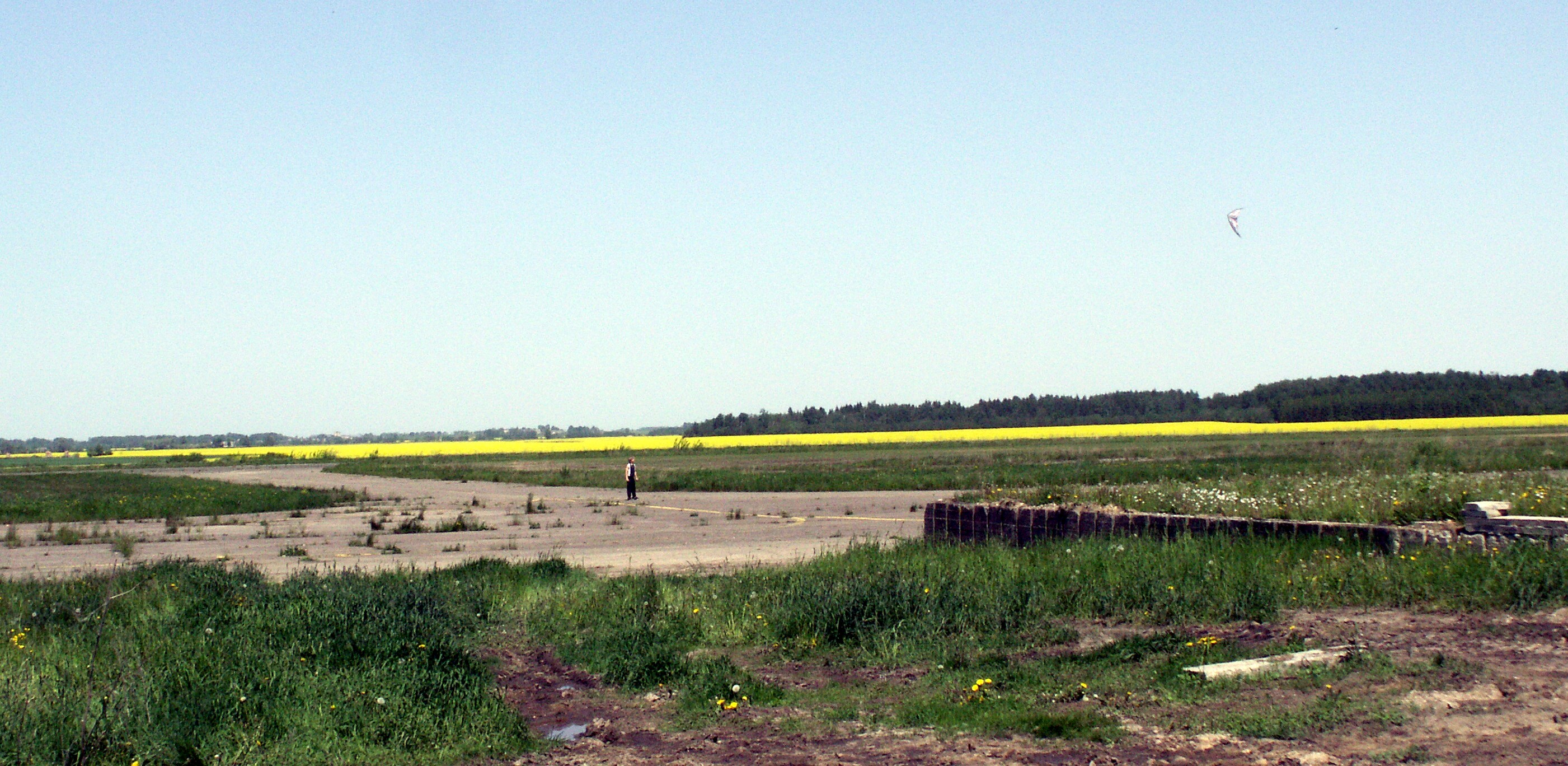

== See also ==
- Šiauliai International Airport (IATA: SQQ, ICAO: EYSA)
