= Jonava railway bridge =

Railway bridge in Lithuania

Coordinates: 55°04′31″N 24°17′39″E

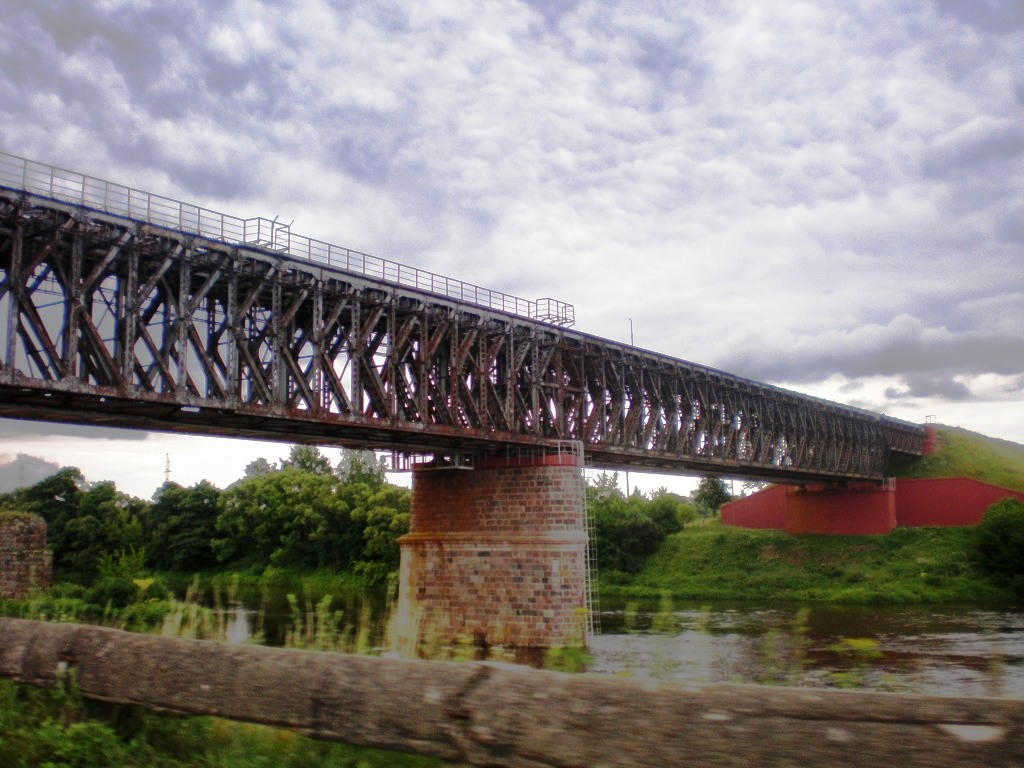
Bridge

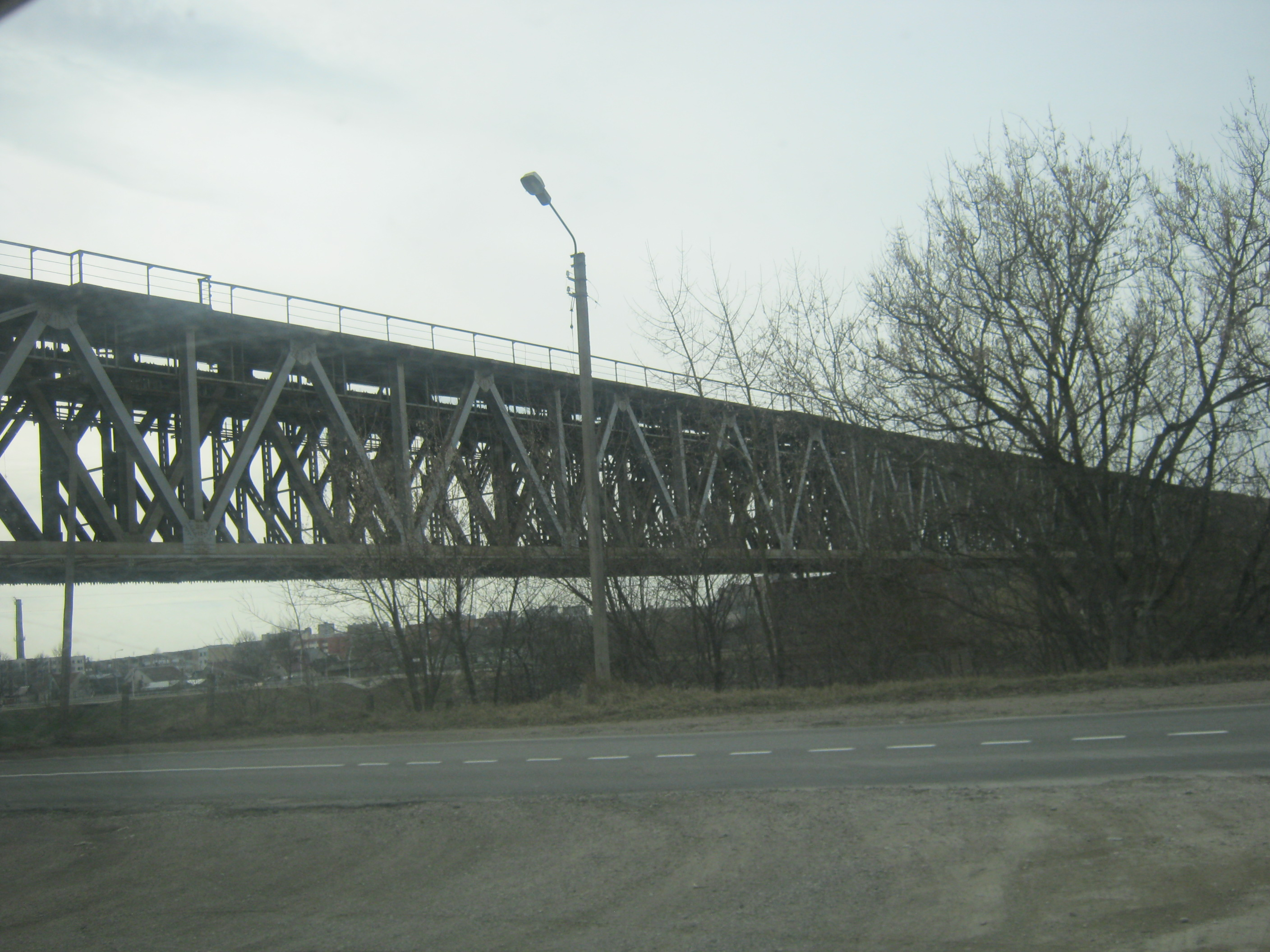

Jonava railway bridge (lit. Jonavos geležinkelio tiltas, Jonavos geležinis tiltas) is a railway bridge over the Neris in Jonava (Jonava district municipality), the ninth largest city in Lithuania with a population of ca 35,000.

== History ==
The old railway bridge in Jonava was built in 1914, designed by Petras Vileišis (1851-1926). In the fall of 1937 taught Lithuanian Armed Forces, designed by Major Juozas Vitkus active reinforced concrete bunkers to defend the bridge. So they were the first in Lithuania, designed and built by local engineers. During the Second World War the bridge was destroyed. A new bridge was built 20 meters further downstream towards Kaunas. One of the old piers of the former railway bridge was left in the Neris River, on which it was planned in 2008 to build a sculpture of the Earth goddess Žemyna.

In 2020-2022 bridge renovated at the cost of €12.5 million.

== Gallery ==
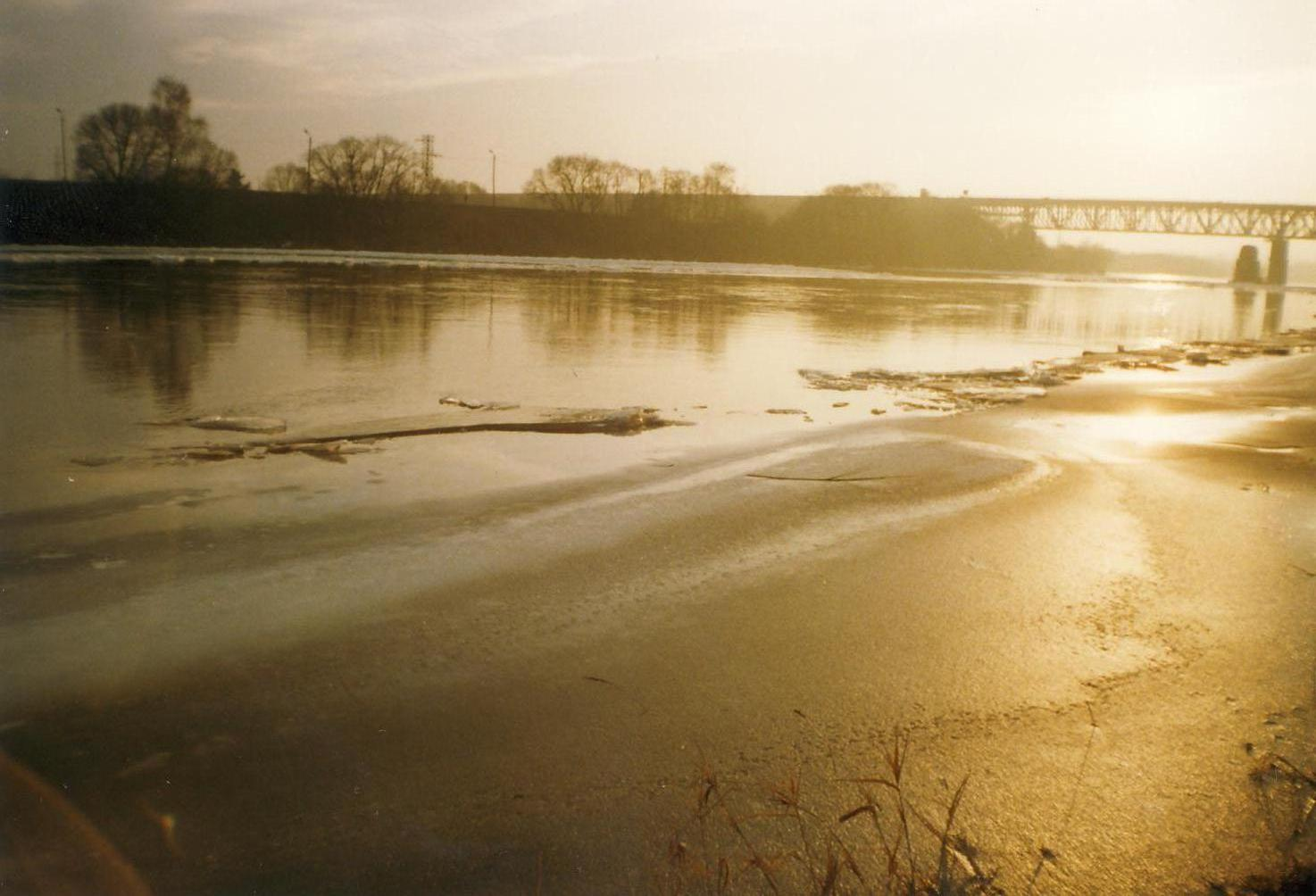

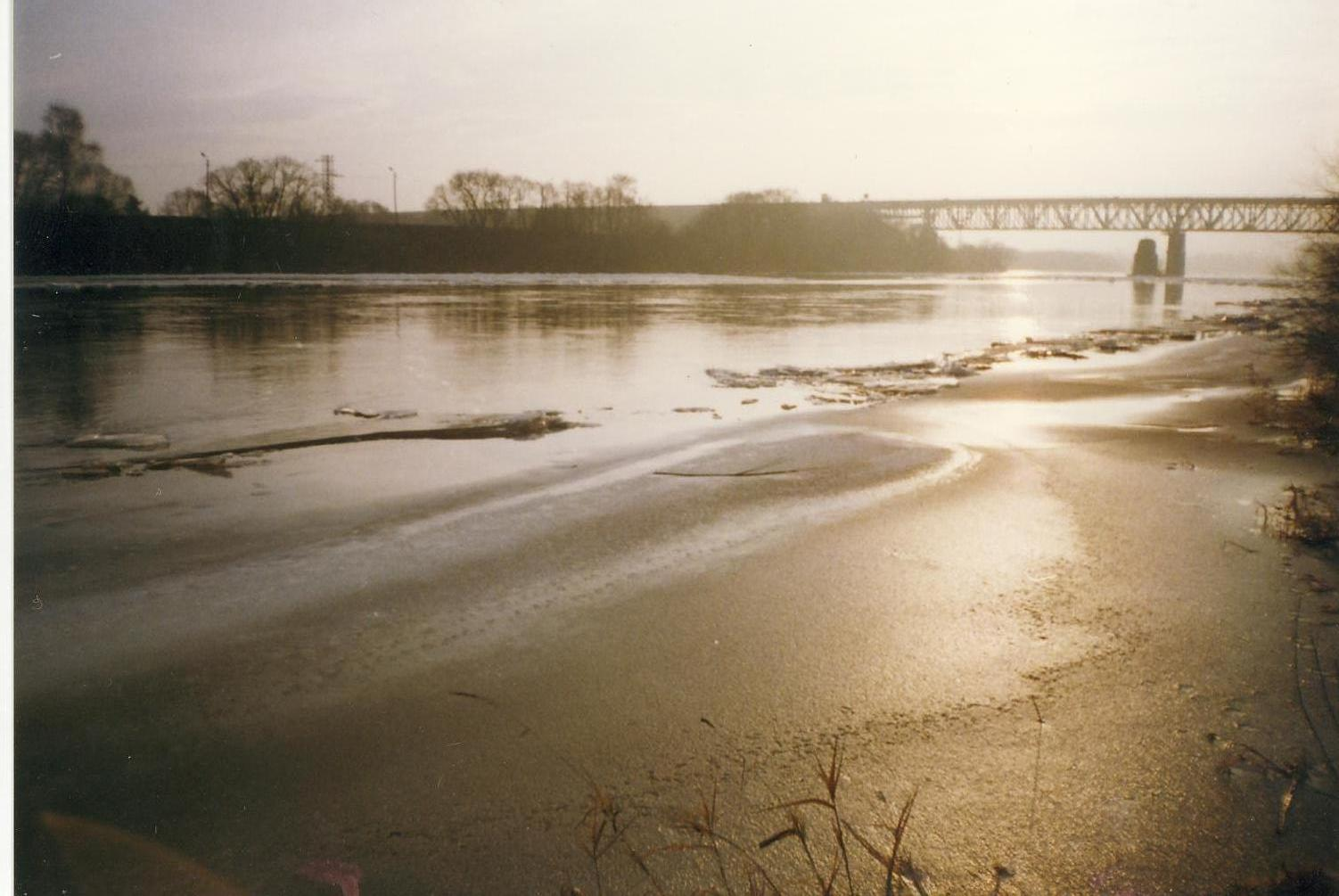

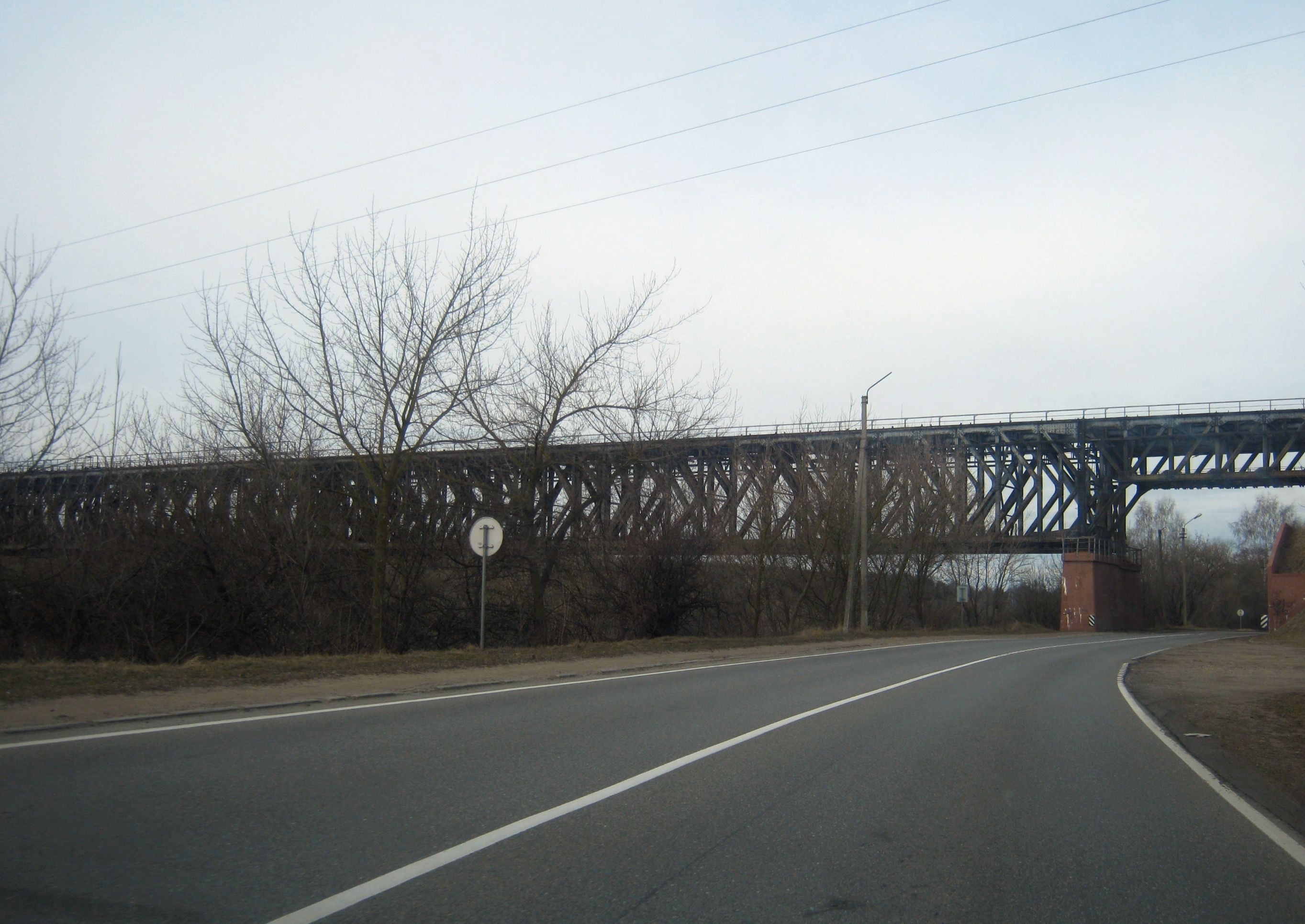

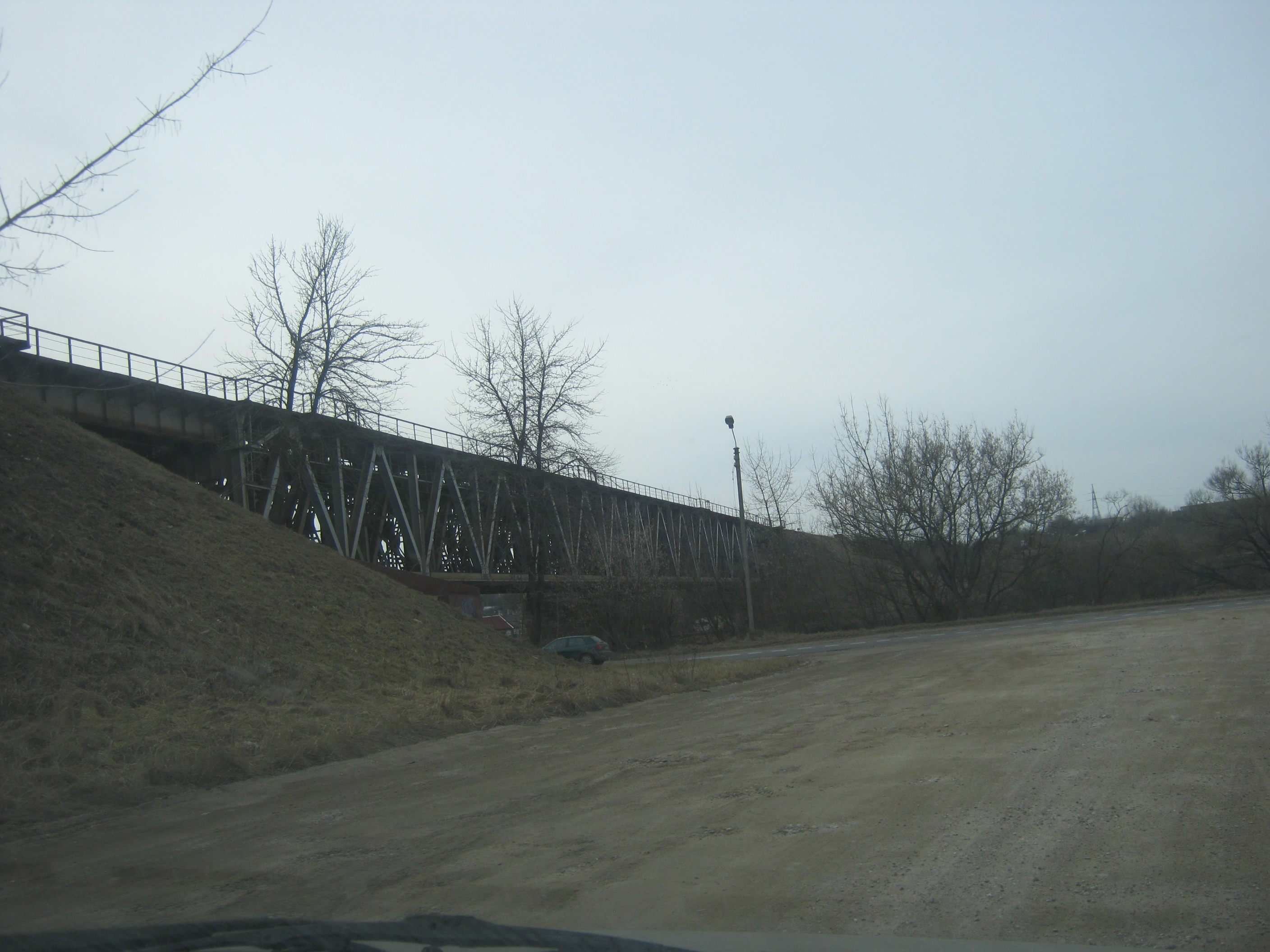
