= Šilutė Airfield =

Šilutė Airfield Šilutės Aerodromas
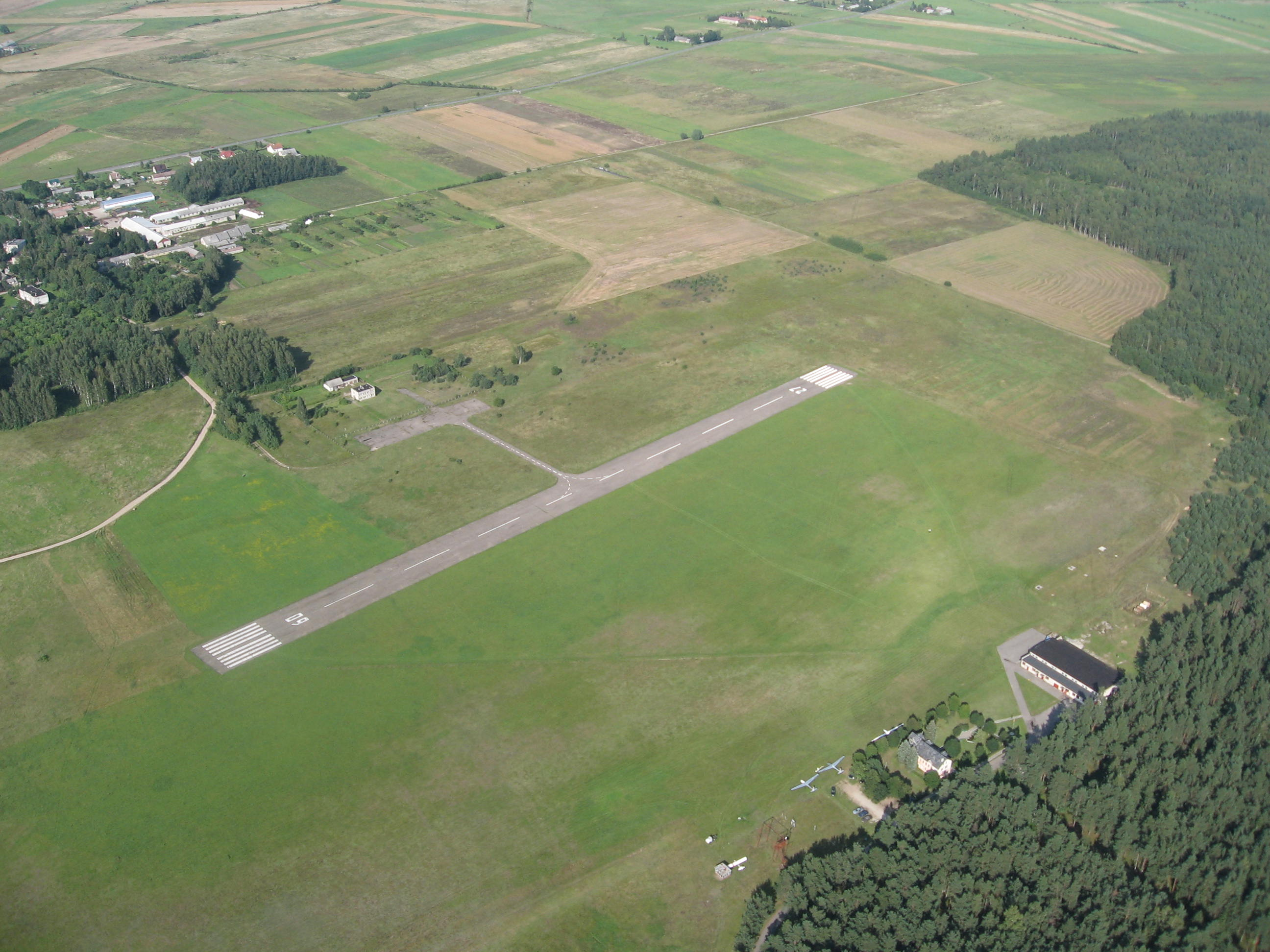
- IATA: none; ICAO: EYSI

Summary
- Airport type: Public
- Serves: Šilutė, Lithuania
- Elevation AMSL: 59 ft (18 m)
- Coordinates: 55°20′13″N 021°31′50″E
- Interactive map of Šilutė Airfield

Runways
Direction	Length		Surface
Direction	m	ft	Surface
09/27	500	1,640	Asphalt concrete
09/27	750	2,460	Grass

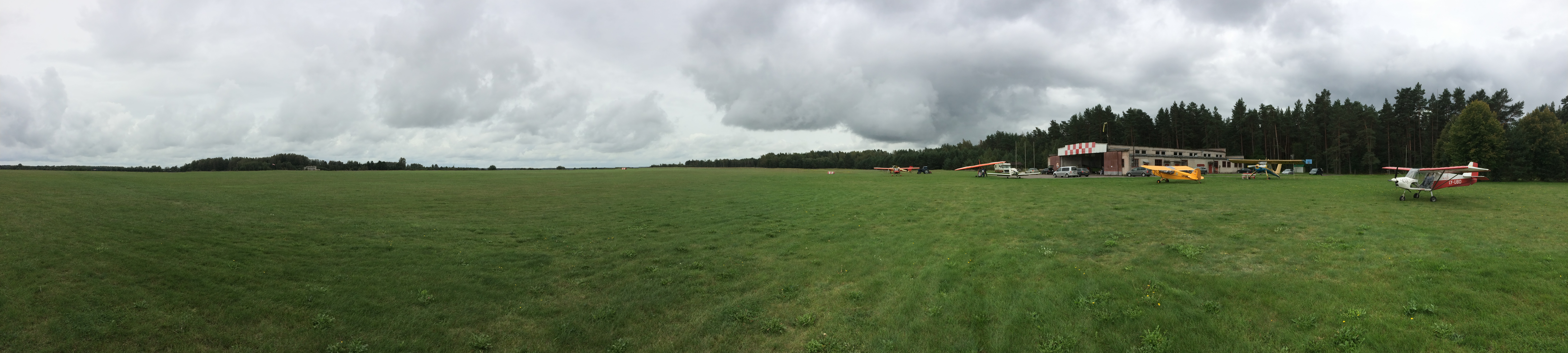
Šilutė airfield

Šilutė airfield (ICAO code: EYSI) is a former Lithuanian Air Force airfield located in Western Lithuania, 5 km (3.1 mi) east of Šilutė. It was used for glider pilot training since the 1950s; today it is mainly used by ultralight aircraft and gliders. The airfield has a concrete runway of 500 m (1,600 ft), which is used mainly by radio control modellers, and a grass strip of ~750 m (2,460 ft), which is regularly maintained and used all year round.
