= List of bridges in Lithuania =

This list of bridges in the Lithuania lists bridges of particular historical, scenic, architectural or engineering interest. Road and railway bridges, viaducts, aqueducts and footbridges are included.

Name	Locality	Date	Image	Notes
Gediminas Bridge	Kupiškis	c.1940		Spans the River Kupa
Green Bridge (Vilnius)	Vilnius	1952		Crosses the River Neris
Jonava Bridge	Jonava	1914		Crosses the River Neris
Jonava railway bridge	Jonava	c.1945		Crosses the River Neris
Jonava railway viaduct	Jonava			Crosses Jonas Basanavičius street (main street) in Jonava
Kaunas railway bridge	Kaunas	1862		Carries railway over the Nemunas River
Lampėdžiai Bridge	Kaunas	1997		Carries A5 motorway over the Nemunas River
Lyduvėnai Bridge	Lyduvėnai	1951		Railway bridge over the River Dubysa
M. K. Čiurlionis Bridge	Kaunas	2002		Crosses the Nemunas River
Mindaugas Bridge	Vilnius	2003		Crosses the River Neris
Petras Vileišis Bridge aka Vilijampolė Bridge	Kaunas	1948		Crosses the River Neris
Taurosta Bridge	Jonava	1986		Carries A6 motorway over the River Neris
Valakampiai Bridge	Vilnius	1972		Crosses the River Neris
Varniai Bridge	Kaunas	1983		Crosses the River Neris
Vytautas the Great Bridge aka Aleksotas Bridge	Kaunas	1930		Crosses the Nemunas River
Žirmūnai Bridge	Vilnius	1965		Crosses the River Neris
