= Red Synagogue of Jonava =

Destroyed synagogue in Jonava, Lithuania

- Lithuanian: Jonavos raudonoji sinagoga
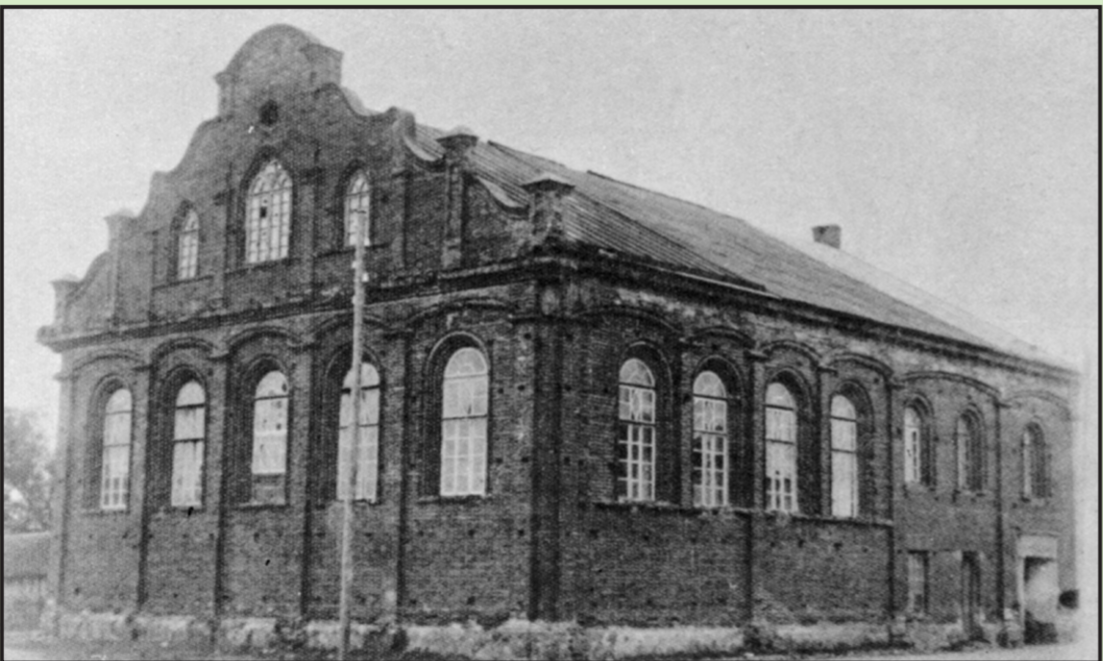
- The former synagogue, in 1880

- Location of the destroyed synagogue in Jonava

Religion
- Affiliation: Judaism (former)
- Ecclesiastical or organizational status: Synagogue (former)
- Status: Destroyed

Location
- Location: Jonava, Kaunas District Municipality
- Country: Lithuania
- Interactive map of Red Synagogue of Jonava
- Coordinates: 55°04′09″N 24°16′20″E

Architecture
- Type: Synagogue architecture
- Destroyed: 1941
- Materials: Brick

The Red Synagogue of Jonava (Lithuanian: Jonavos raudonoji sinagoga), also Beit Knesset Hagadol (Lithuanian: Jonavos Beit Knesset Hagadol sinagoga), was a former Jewish congregation and synagogue, that was located in Jonava, in the Kaunas District Municipality of Lithuania. The building operated as a synagogue until it was destroyed by Nazis in 1941, during World War II.

== History ==
In 1941 80% of Jonava's population was Jewish and the town had seven synagogues. However, only two synagogues remain, the Beit Medrash Hagadol Synagogue and the Synagogue of Merchants; and both are not in use. The Red Synagogue was the biggest and main synagogue in Jonava, located in front of the remaining Beit Midrash Hagadol Synagogue. The Red Synagogue, and all other synagogues, were destroyed when Jonava was attacked by Nazi Germany.

== See also ==
- History of the Jews in Lithuania
- Lithuanian Jews
