= Beit Medrash Hagadol Synagogue =

Former synagogue in Jonava, Lithuania

Beit Medrash Hagadol Synagogue (White Synagogue of Jonava)
- Lithuanian: Beit Midrash Hagadol sinagoga (Lithuanian: Jonavos Baltoji sinagoga)
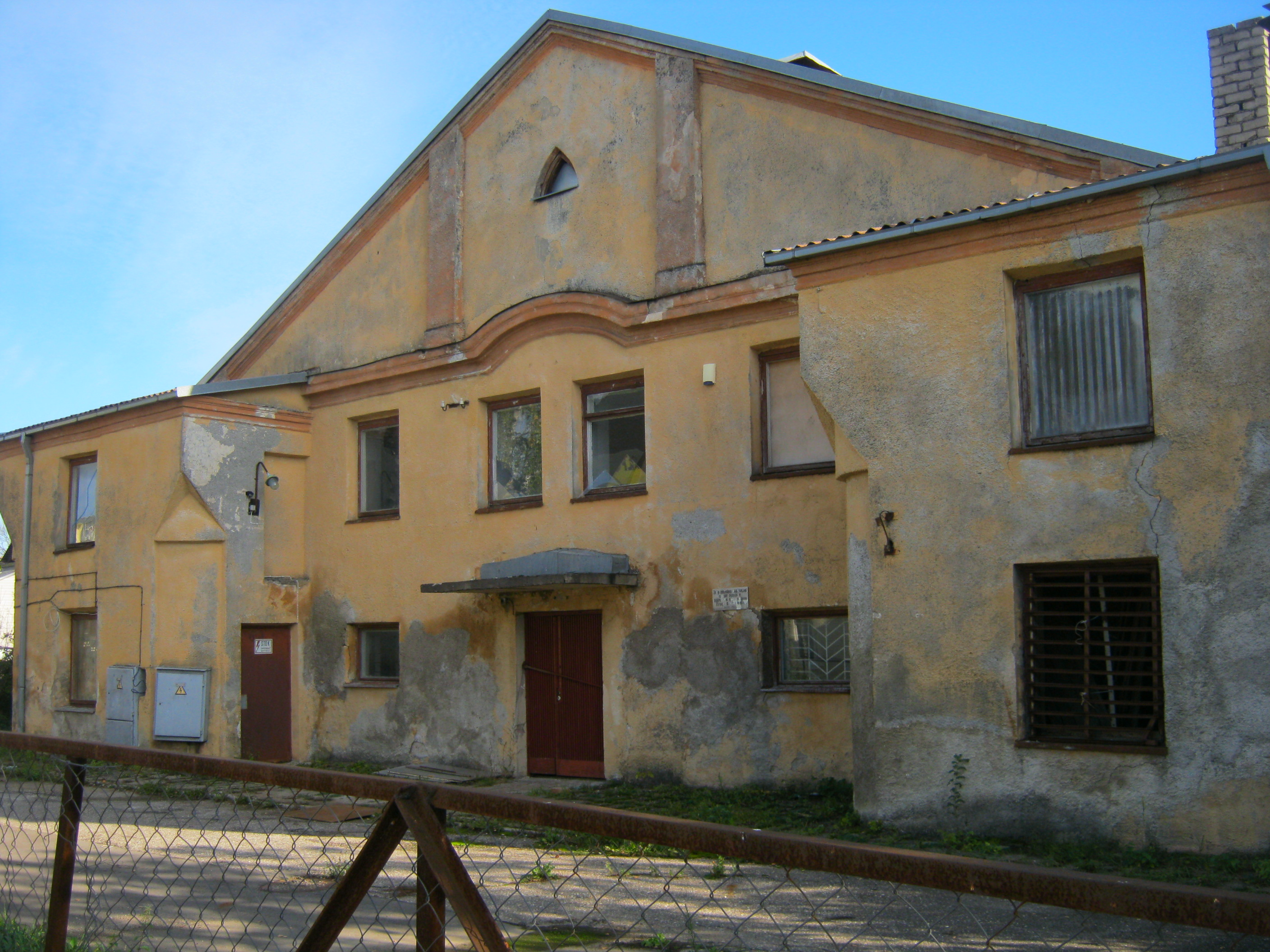
- The former synagogue in 2011

- Location of the former synagogue in Jonava

Religion
- Affiliation: Judaism (former)
- Rite: Nusach Ashkenaz
- Ecclesiastical or organizational status: Synagogue (c. 1850–1945); Profane use (since 1945)
- Status: Abandoned

Location
- Location: 3 Sodų Street, Jonava, Kaunas District Municipality
- Country: Lithuania
- Interactive map of Beit Medrash Hagadol Synagogue (White Synagogue of Jonava)
- Coordinates: 55°4′9″N 24°16′22″E

Architecture
- Type: Synagogue architecture
- Style: Historicist; Baroque Revival
- Completed: c. 1850
- Materials: Brick

The Beit Medrash Hagadol Synagogue (Lithuanian: Beit Midrash Hagadol sinagoga), also known as the White Synagogue of Jonava (Lithuanian: Jonavos Baltoji sinagoga), is a former Jewish congregation and synagogue, located at 3 Sodų Street, in Jonava, in the Kaunas District Municipality of Lithuania.

Designed in the Historicist Baroque Revival style, the building was completed in c. 1850 and operated as a synagogue until it was devastated by Nazis during World War II. The building was subsequently used for profane purposes, however has since been abandoned.

== History ==
In 1941 80% of Jonava's population was Jewish and town had seven synagogues. The Beit Medrash Hagadol Synagogue together with the Jonava Synagogue of Merchants are the only remaining synagogues in the town; and both are not in use. The Beit Medrash Hagadol Synagogue was one of the two biggest synagogues in Jonava. The main synagogue, called the Red Synagogue of Jonava, that was located next to Beit Midrash Hagadol, was destroyed by Nazis, along with the other synagogues.

In 2015 Beit Medrash Hagadol Synagogue of Jonava was listed in on a register of cultural values.

The appearance of the former synagogue in 2011 differed significantly from its original 1850's appearance. New windows were installed, external decorations were removed, and the interior has not survived. After World War II, a bakery was established in the building, and it was later sold to private interests. The ruins of a mikveh are located nearby.

== See also ==
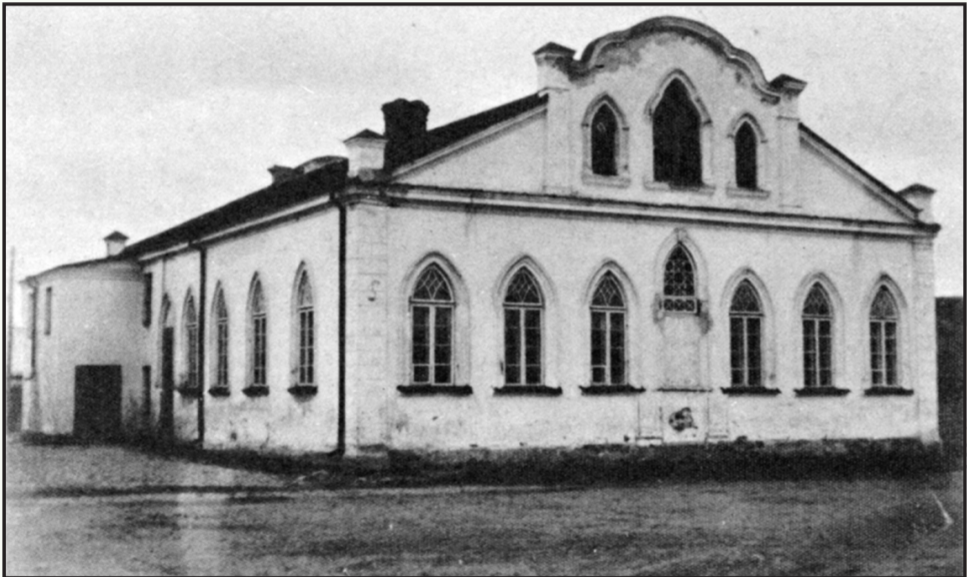
The former synagogue, in 1880

- History of the Jews in Lithuania
- Lithuanian Jews
