= Achema-KKSC =

Lithuanian women's volleyball club

- Full name: Jonavos Achema-Jonavos Kūno Kūltūros ir Sporto Centras
- Ground: Jonavos KKSC, Jonava (Capacity: 500)
- League: A Grupė; Baltic League
- 2013-14: 1st (Lithuanian League); 3rd (BalticLeague)

Achema-KKSC is women's volleyball club from Jonava, Lithuania.

== Seasons ==
Results in the highest league of Lithuania:

- 1998/1999 – 5th
- 1999/2000 – 2nd
- 2000/2001 – 3rd
- 2001/2002 – 3rd
- 2002/2003 – 3rd
- 2003/2004 – 2nd
- 2004/2005 – 5th
- 2005/2006 – 2nd
- 2006/2007 – 3rd
- 2007/2008 – 1st
- 2008/2009 – 1st
- 2009/2010 – 1st
- 2010/2011 – 3rd
- 2011/2012 – 2nd
- 2012/2013 - 1st
- 2013/2014 - 1st
