= Centre of Sports in Jonava =

Sports venue in Jonava, Lithuania

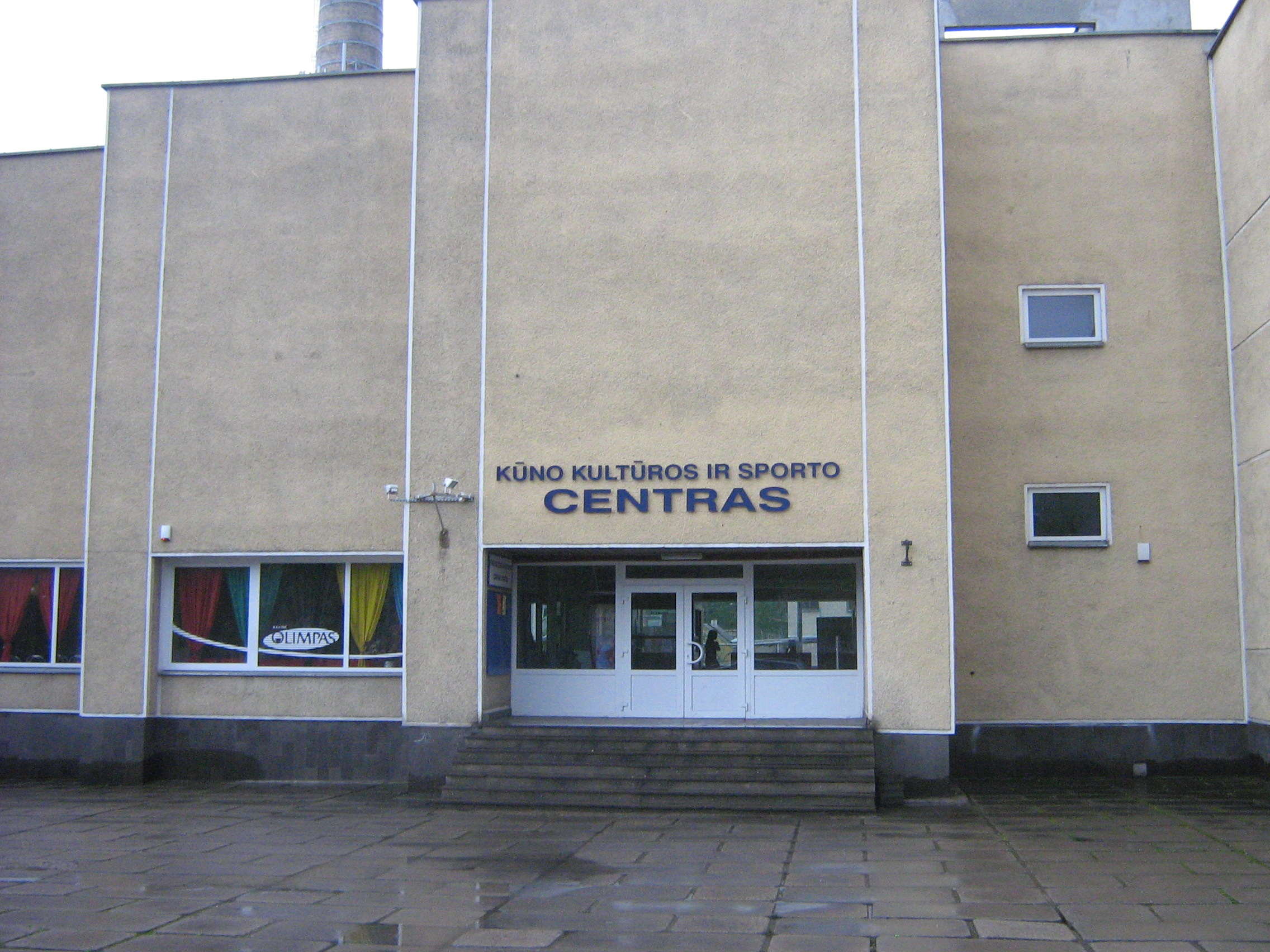
- Interactive map of Centre of Sports in Jonava
- Location: Jonava, Lithuania
- Coordinates: 55°04′22″N 24°16′37″E
- Capacity: Basketball: 500

Tenants
- BC Malsta; Achema-KKSC

Centre of Sports in Jonava is an indoor sporting center in Jonava, Lithuania. It holds a boxing base, a pool, a table tennis base, a gym and a main ground. The sporting center also holds basketball and volleyball competitions.

In 2014, the Centre hosted the playoffs for the Baltic Women's Volleyball League.

The Jonava indoor arena will be replaced with the Jonava Arena (planned to open 2014–2016, capacity: 3,000).

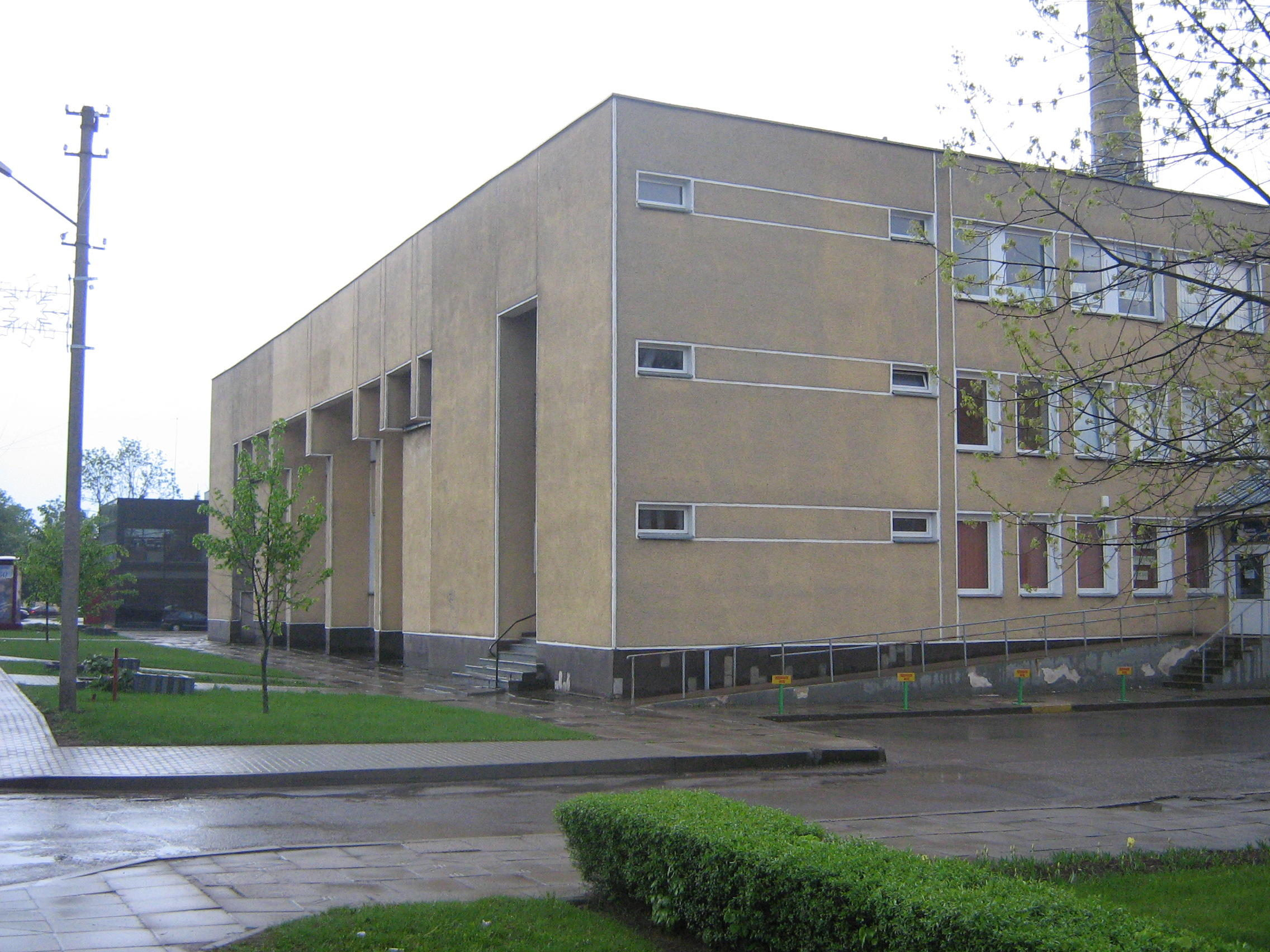
