= Pakalniškis =

- Lithuanian surname
- m.: Pakalniškis
- f.: (unmarried): Pakalniškytė
- f.: (married): Pakalniškienė

Pakalniškis is a Lithuanian language family name.

Notable people with the surname include:

- Saulius Pakalniškis (1958–2006), Lithuanian zoologist, entomologist and dipterologist
- Kazimieras Pakalniškis (1866–1933), Lithuanian priest, publicist, writer, and editor
- Ričardas Pakalniškis (1935–1994), Lithuanian researcher and critic of Lithuanian literature
- Vytautas Pakalniškis, Lithuanian lawyer and politician
