= Jonava Bridge =

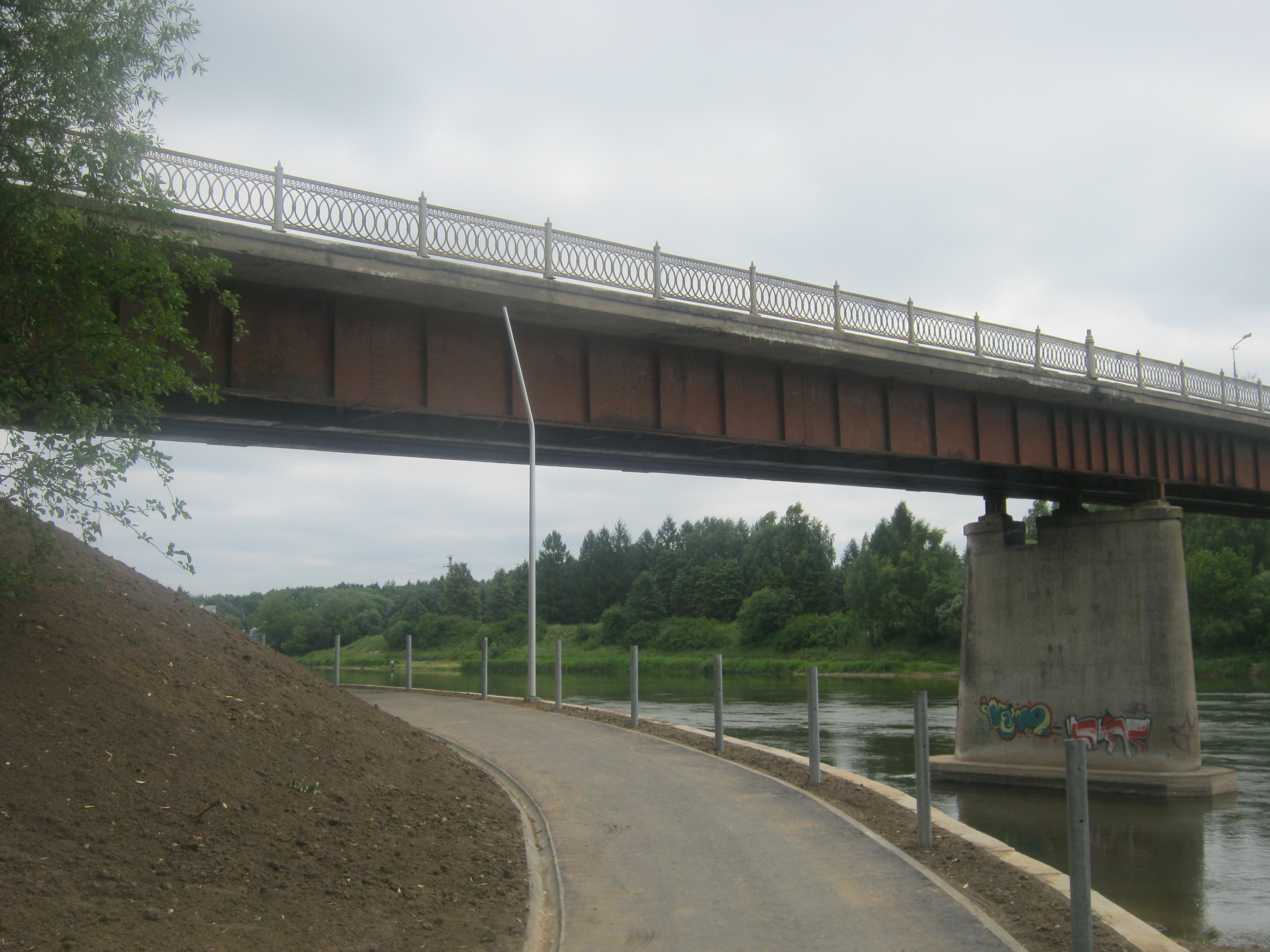
- Coordinates: 55°4′7″N 24°16′54″E
- Crosses: Neris
- Locale: Jonava
- Official name: Jonavos tiltas

Characteristics
- Total length: 230 m

History
- Opened: 1914

Location
- Interactive map of Jonava Bridge

The Jonava Bridge (Lithuanian: Jonavos tiltas) is a bridge in Jonava, Lithuania. It crosses the river Neris. Big trucks are not allowed to cross the bridge, they need to cross over Taurosta Bridge. Bridge has 1 way lanes going each way.
