= Jonava Lietava comprehensive school =

- Jonavos „Lietavos“ pagrindinė mokykla
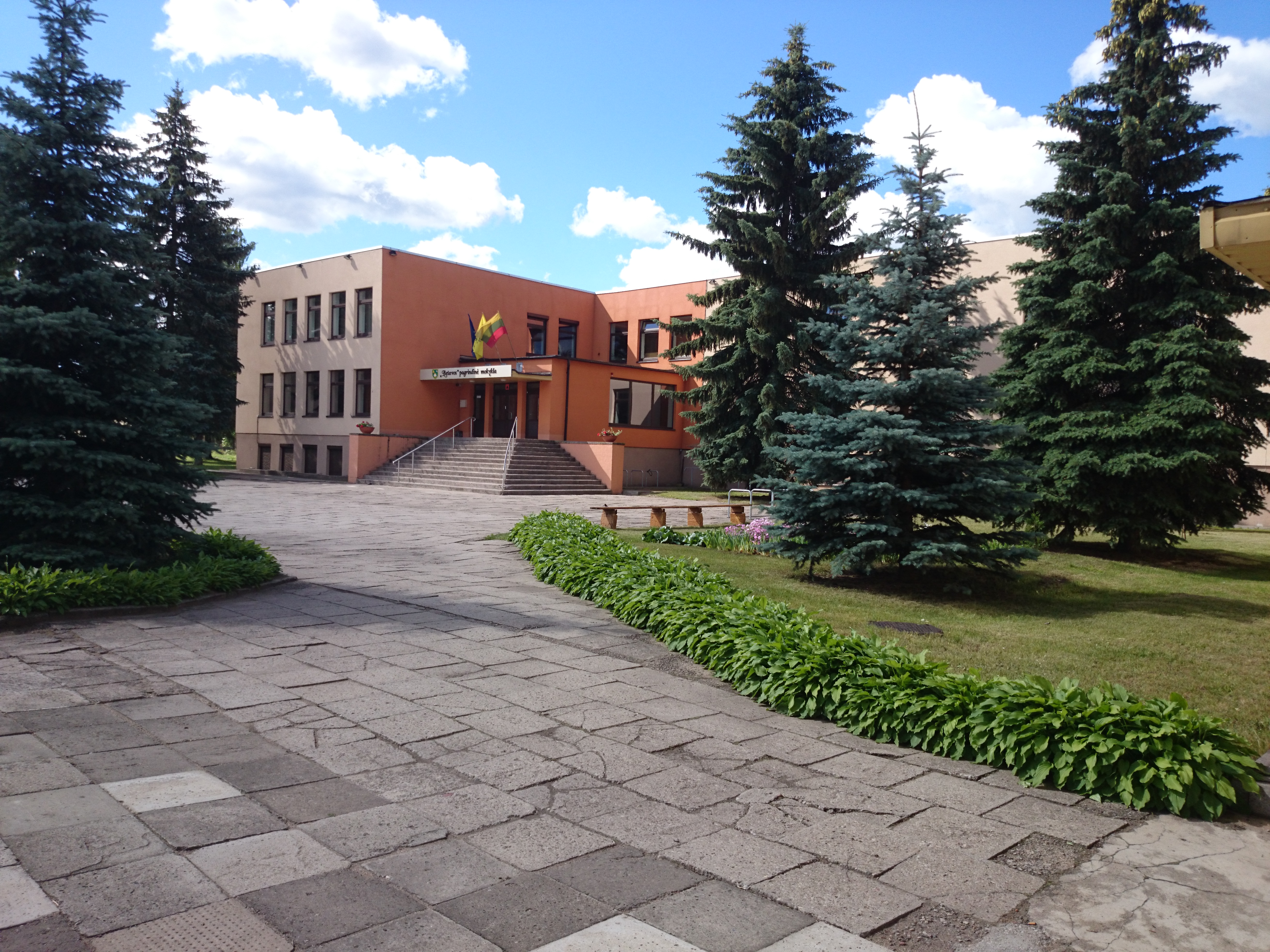

Location
- Fabriko Str. 10; Jonava, LT-55111; Lithuania; 55°05′17″N 24°16′46″E

Information
- Type: Public, grades 1–10
- Established: 1 September 1937
- School code: 190302241
- Principal: Ina Skurdelienė
- Employees: 37
- Enrollment: 437
- Language: Lithuanian
- Website: www.lietavos.jonava.lm.lt

Jonavos "Lietavos" pagrindinė mokykla (English: Jonava Lietava comprehensive school) is a public comprehensive school in Jonava, Lithuania. It is the only school at Jonava railway station rayon. It was founded in 1937 and includes grades 1–10.

== History ==
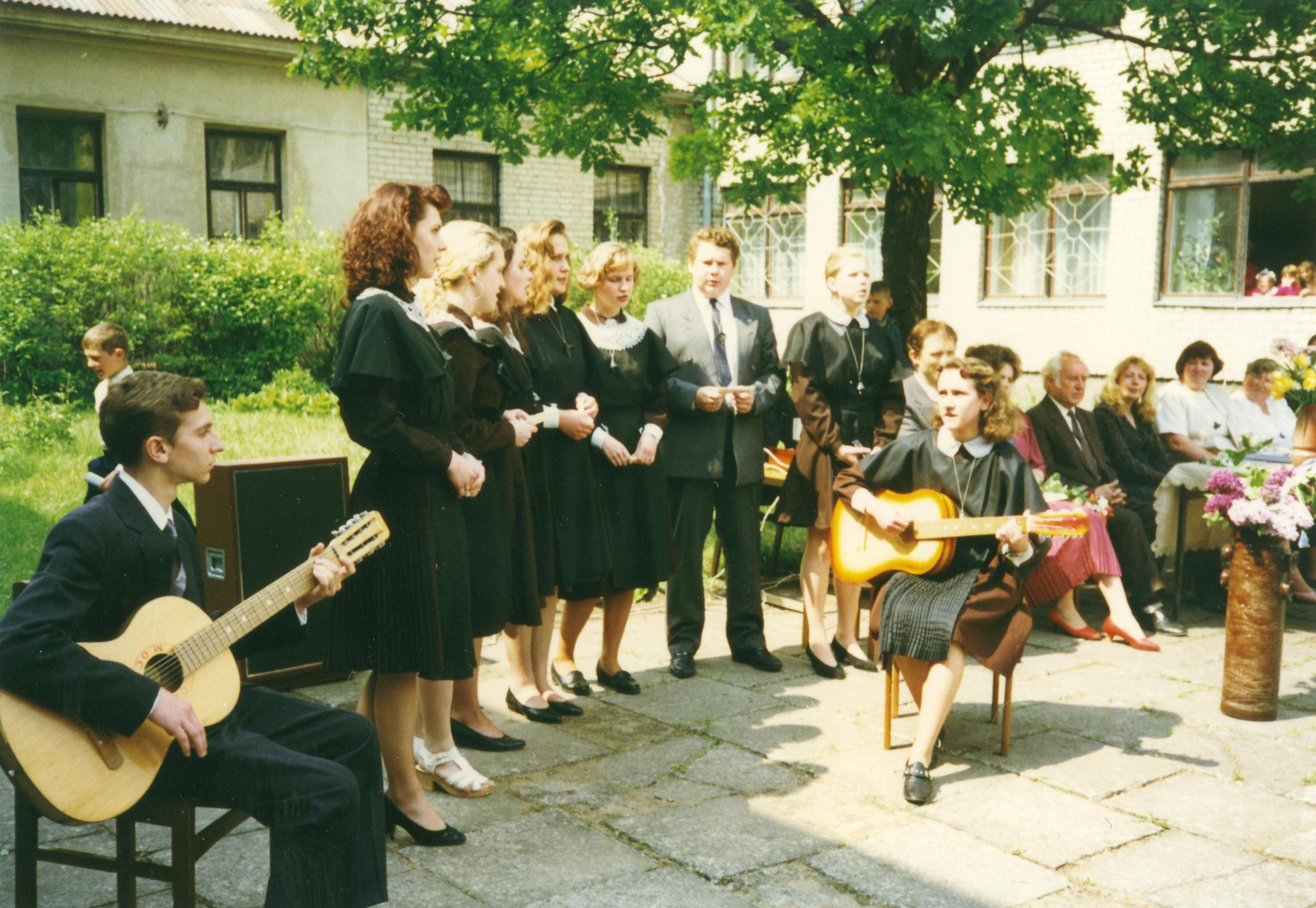
Abiturients in 1996

In 1937, started Jonava railway station Primary School which operated until 1952. It was located in a private house in the Šviesos street, no. 25a (to 1946 teacher was Kedušienė).

In 1952 the school moved to a new building, Gagarin street no. 10 (now Fabriko street 10), the school body to build two extensions.

In 1955 the elementary school was converted into a seven-year school and in 1960 to an eight-year school.

In 1970, eight-year school named Jonava 3rd High School (to the 2001). Jonava 3rd High School graduate 25 graduates shows.

In 1974, built another wing.

In November 1997, Jonava 3rd Secondary School was consecrated from Vincas Pranckietis, pastor of Jonava St. Jacob the Apostle Church. After Mass, the students and teachers visited the Jonava cemetery and laid flowers and lit candles on the dead teachers' and students' graves.

After the independence of Lithuania the school stadium was completed and the construction of (about 30 m) gym (originally planned to be installed as shooting space-shooting, gym).

Jonava Municipal Council at 27 January 2000 (Decision No. 3) transformed from 2001 Jonava 3rd High School into comprehensive school (3rd high school graduated 30 alumni shows).

On 19 July 2001, School awarded the "Lietava" comprehensive name.

== Headmasters ==
- 1962–2000: Kazys Šerėnas (died 2010);
- 2000 – 25 July 2009: Kęstutis Jakštas;
- 10 August 2009 – 1 November 2009: Gražina Švėgždė (comm.).
- 2 November 2009 – present: Ina Skurdelienė (ex deputaty director of Kaunas Panemunės primary school)

== Notable students ==
- Arnoldas Burkovskis (born 1967), financier, Head of Turto bankas, vice minister of economy of Lithuania
- Vydas Dolinskas (born 1970), art critic, art historian, head of Palace of the Grand Dukes of Lithuania
- Andrius Janukonis (born 1971), jurist and entrepreneur, head of company group ICOR
- Saulius Pakalniškis (1958-2006), biologist entomologist
