= Saulius Pakalniškis =

Lithuanian zoologist (1958–2006)

Saulius Pakalniškis (born 15 June 1958 in Staškūniškis, Anykščiai district municipality-21 February 2006) was a Lithuanian zoologist, entomologist and dipterologist (researcher of flies).

== Biography ==
In 1976, Saulius graduated from Jonava 3rd Middle School in Jonava and in 1985 - Vilnius University, Faculty of Natural Sciences. For a time he worked at Jonava furniture factory, and then served in the Soviet Army. After returning from her, attended preparatory courses, preparing to enroll in the Vilnius University. Viewed nature, vegetation (although it attracted more small fauna). Acquainted with the employees of invertebrate zoology sector at Institute of Zoology and Parasitology.

From 1979 to 1989 he was technician, senior technician, junior research fellow at Institute of Zoology and Parasitology of Lithuanian Academy. From 1990 he was Assistant Research Fellow at Institute of Ecology. In 1994, defended he at Ecology Institute his doctoral thesis about flies. He was a researcher at Institute of Ecology of Vilnius University, member of Lithuanian Entomological Society.

Saulius Pakalniškis first described a new kind of science leafminers: Liriomyza labanoro, Liriomyza lituanica and Pseudonapomyze stanionyteae. He described the Lithuanian mining dipteran insect fauna. Wrote the book "Plants insects discriminatory manner" (1985, With other authors. Publications "Žuvintas reserve" (1993, in Russian), The Lithuanian state reserves of flora and fauna" (1997) with others. He published research articles and participated in a number of scientific expeditions in Lithuania, Latvia, Belarus and other countries.
