= Jonava Senamiestis Gymnasium =

- Jonavos Senamiesčio gimnazija
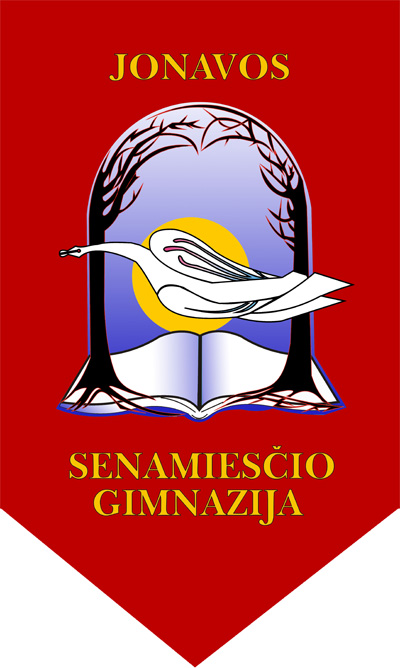

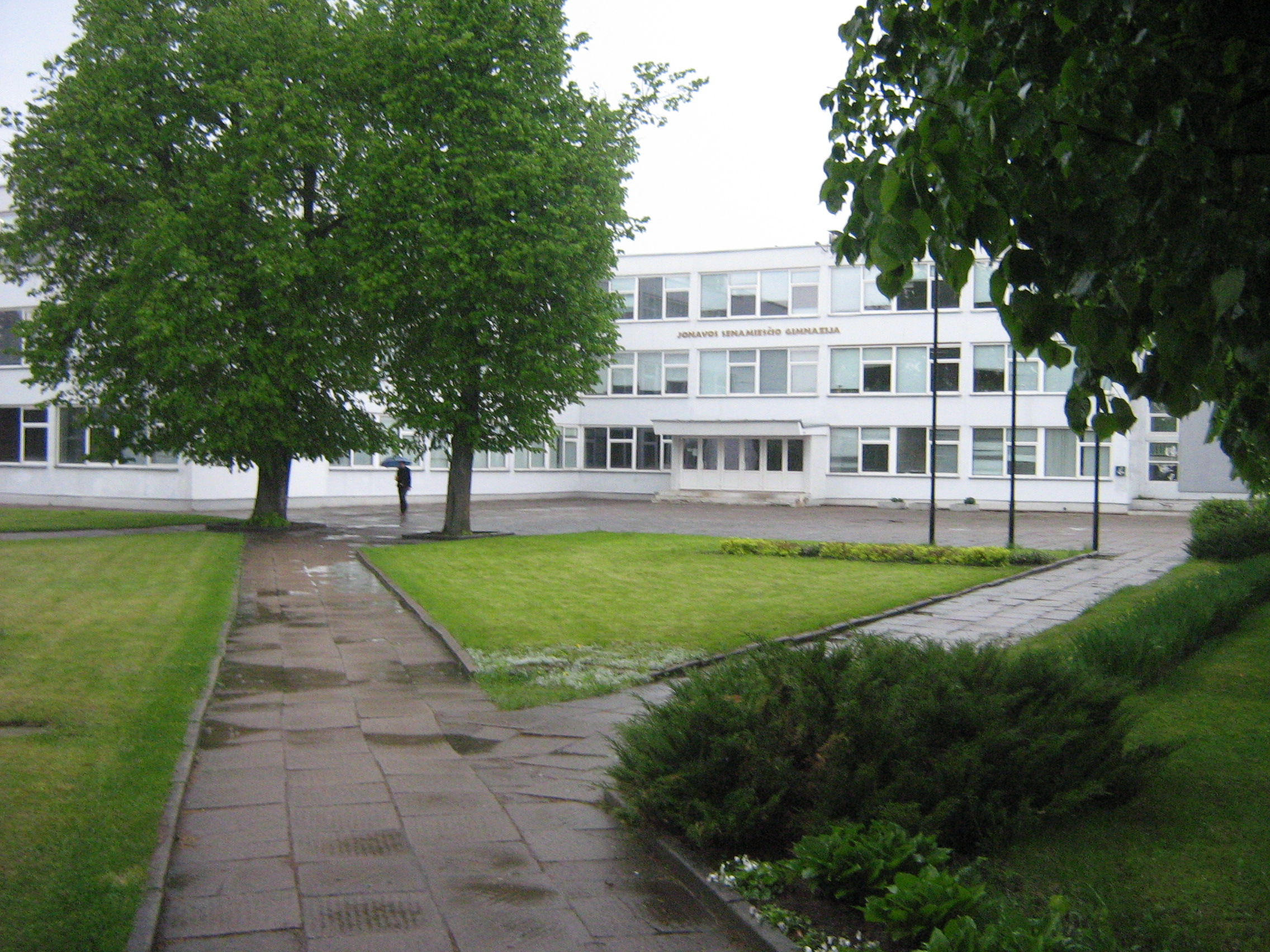

Location
- 76 Kaunas Str. Jonava, LT-55178; Lithuania
- Coordinates: 55°04′13″N 24°16′03″E

Information
- Type: Public, grades 9–12
- Motto: Latin: Docendo discimus (By teaching, we learn)
- Established: 15 September 1974
- School code: 190302622
- Principal: Darius Mockus
- Employees: 65
- Enrollment: 816
- Language: Lithuanian
- Colour: White Red
- Website: http://www.senamiescio-g.lt

Jonavos Senamiesčio gimnazija (English: Jonava Senamiestis Gymnasium) is a public gymnasium in Jonava, Lithuania. It was founded in 1998 and includes grades 9–12. Its institution code is 190302622. The gymnasium's anthem was changed several times because of politic structure changes in Lithuania. The current anthem was recognized in 2001.

== Headmasters ==
- 1974: A. Katinas;
- 1998: I. Šidlauskaitė Banevičienė;
- 1999: Rita Čiužienė;
- Current: Darius Mockus.
