= Jonava Market =

Place in Lithuania

Coordinates: 55°04′35″N 24°16′53″E

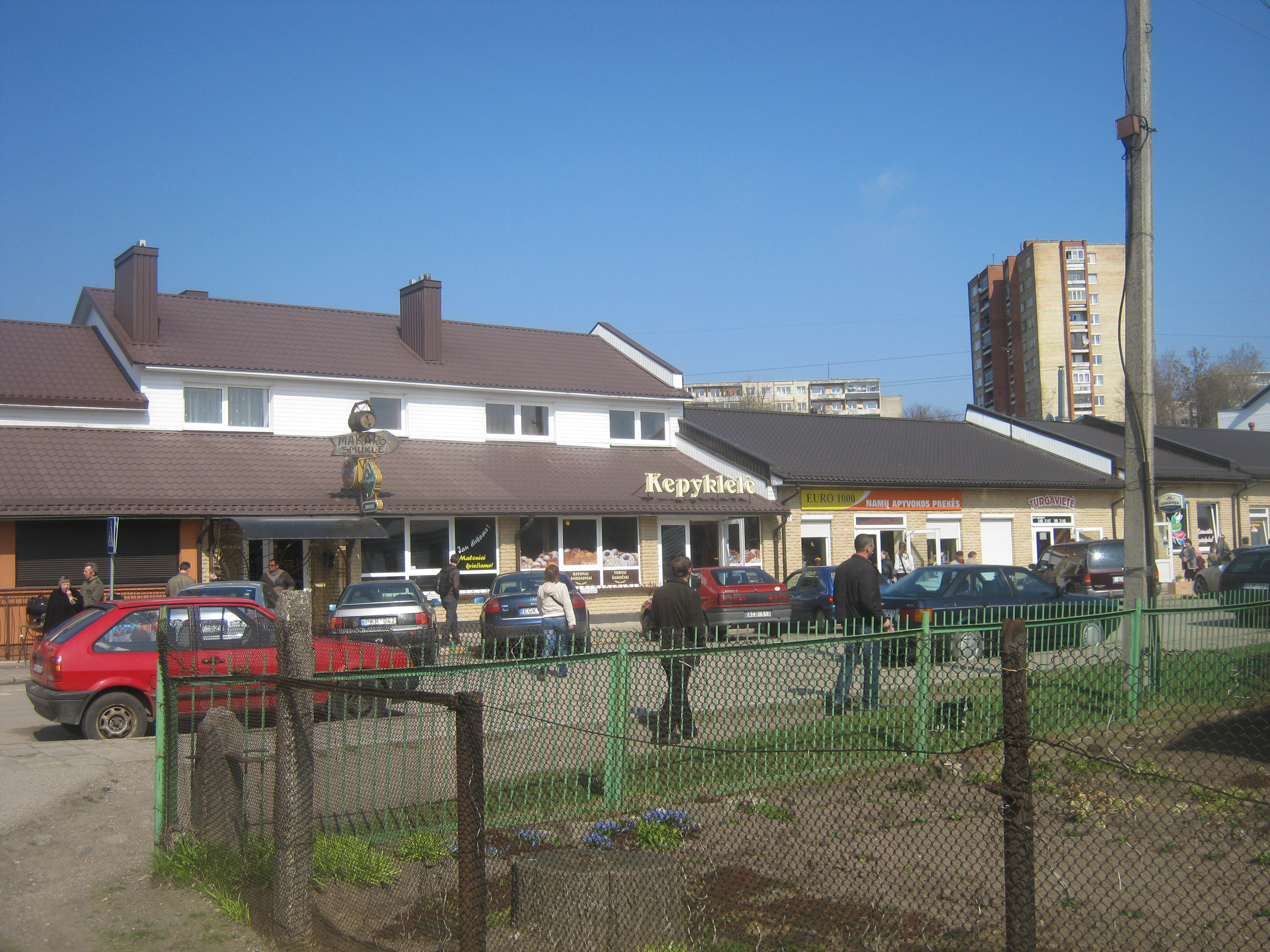

The Jonava Market is a local market in the city of Jonava, Lithuania.

== History ==
The Jonava Market was established in the 18–19th century. It became famous as a marketplace for grains and horses. In 2010, the Jonava Market was renovated: a roof was added over the food section, more pavilions were built, and indoor stalls were renovated.
