= Arnoldas Burkovskis =

Lithuanian politician

Arnoldas Burkovskis (born 1967 in Jonava) is a Lithuanian financer bank manager, head of Turto Bankas, a former politician, and deputy Minister of Economy of Lithuania.

== Early life ==
He graduated 1984 from Jonava 3rd Middle School. Burkovskis graduated in physics at Vilnius University (VU) and after that, received a master's degree in economics at the International Business School at VU. From 2005 to 2008 he studied in Amsterdam at a financial institution in the Netherlands.

== Career ==
From 1992 he worked at Bank AB Hermis, E Energija, Šiaulių Banko Investicijų Valdymas, Arthur Andersen etc. Then he was advisor to the Minister of Economy Dainius Kreivys and from 2009 to 2010 deputy minister of economy. His successor was Daumantas Lapinskas. Since September 2010 Burkovskis has been chairman and managing director of the Lithuanian bank Turto Bankas.

== Personal life ==
Burkovskis is divorced and has a son.

He speaks Russian and English.
