= Jonava Synagogue of Merchants =

Synagogue in Jonava, Lithuania

- Lithuanian: Jonavos pirklių sinagoga
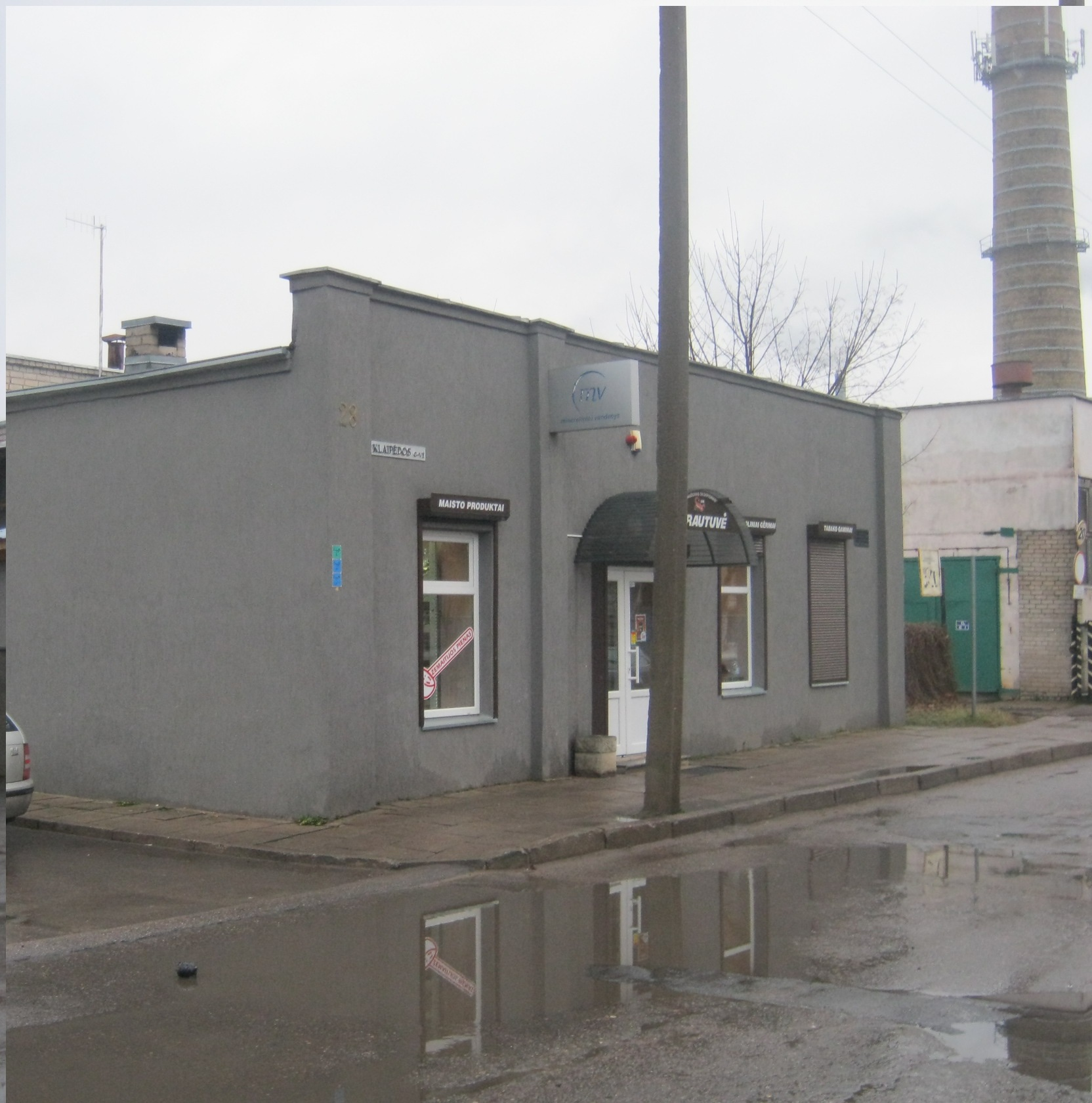
- The former synagogue, in 2010

- Location of the former synagogue in Jonava

Religion
- Affiliation: Judaism (former)
- Rite: Nusach Ashkenaz
- Ecclesiastical or organizational status: Synagogue (c. 1850–1945); Profane use (since 1945)
- Status: Abandoned (as a synagogue); Repurposed

Location
- Location: 28 Klaipėdos Street, Jonava, Kaunas District Municipality
- Country: Lithuania
- Interactive map of Jonava Synagogue of Merchants
- Coordinates: 55°04′17″N 24°16′33″E

Architecture
- Type: Synagogue architecture
- Style: Historicist
- Completed: 1905
- Materials: Brick

The Jonava Synagogue of Merchants (Lithuanian: Jonavos pirklių sinagoga) is a former Jewish congregation and synagogue, located at 28 Klaipėdos Street, in Jonava, in the Kaunas District Municipality of Lithuania.

Designed in the Historicist style, the building was completed in 1905 and operated as a synagogue until it was destroyed by Nazis during World War II. The building was subsequently used for profane purposes, and has since been repurposed as a shop.

== History ==
In 1941, 80% of Jonava's population was Jewish and town had seven synagogues. The Jonava Synagogue of Merchants together with the Beit Medrash Hagadol Synagogue are the only remaining synagogues in the town; and both are not in use. The other synagogues were destroyed when Jonava was attacked by Nazi Germany.

A commemorative plaque was affixed to the side of the building in 2000.

As of 2015, the appearance of the synagogue differed significantly from its original appearance and was much smaller. At that time it had been repurposed as a shop.

== See also ==
- History of the Jews in Lithuania
- Lithuanian Jews
