= Jonava Janina Miščiukaitė School of Art =

Public art school in Jonava, Lithuania

Coordinates: 55°04′25″N 24°16′42″E

Janina Miščiukaitė School of Art
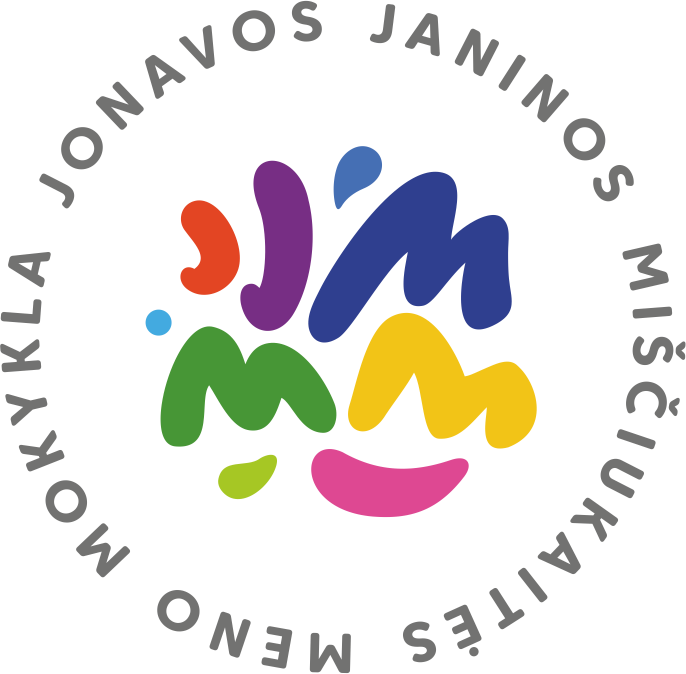

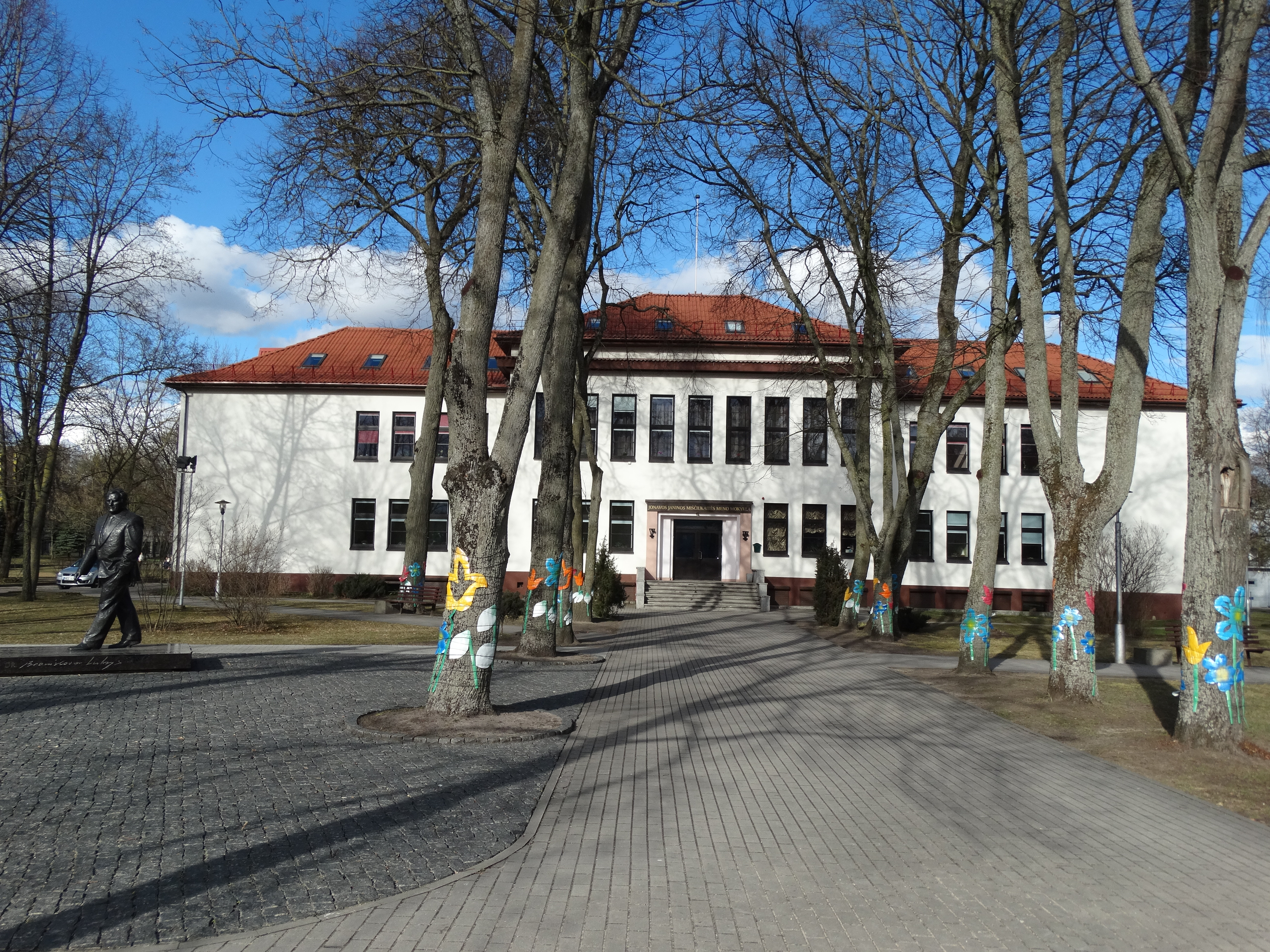
- 6 Žeimiai Str., Jonava, Jonava district, Lithuania

Information
- Type: Public, Art school
- Established: 1965
- Headmaster: Rita Trimonienė
- Employees: 64
- Website: www.jmm.lt

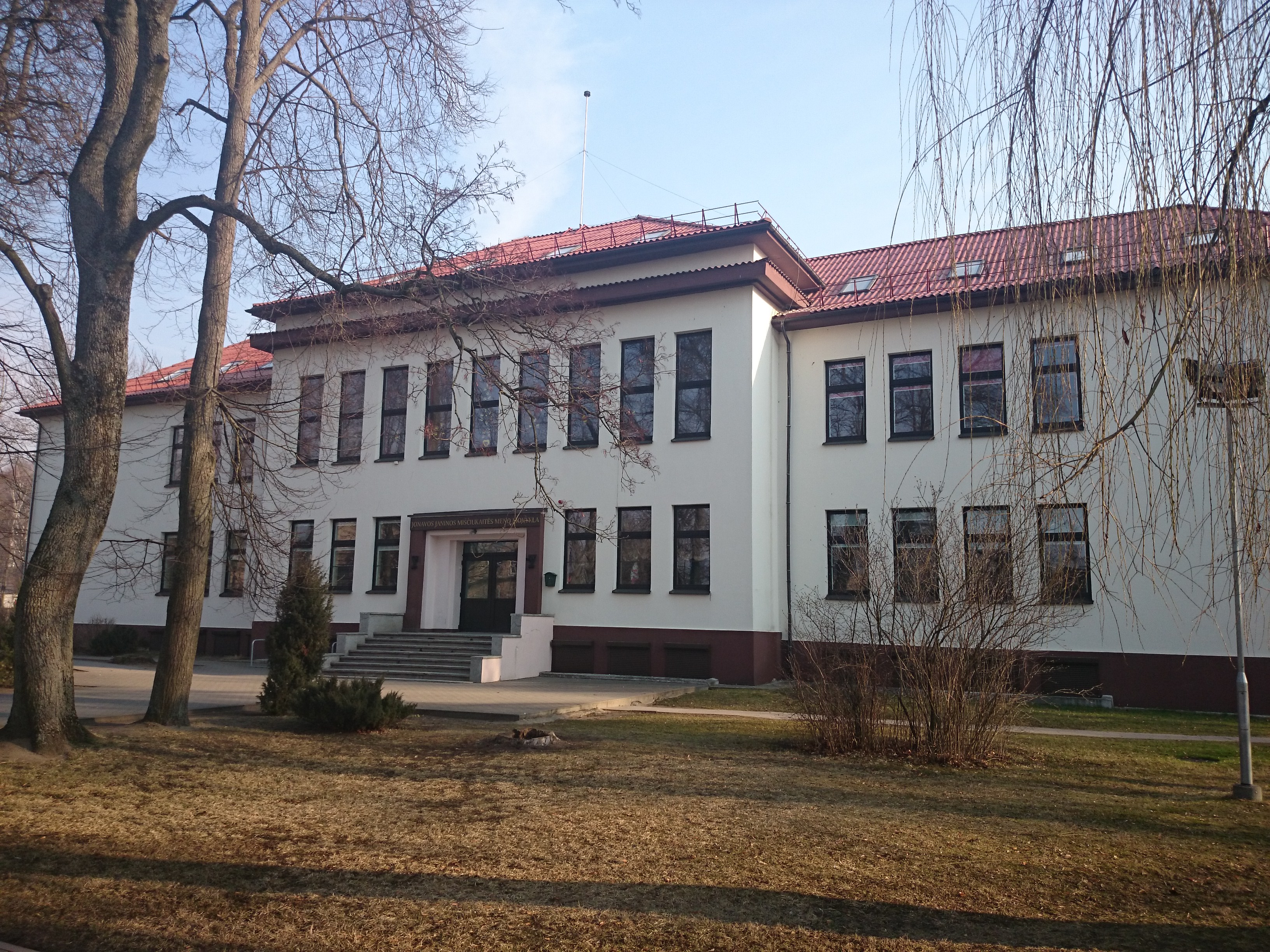
School in 2015 spring

Janina Miščiukaitė School of Art (Lithuanian: Janinos Miščiukaitės meno mokykla) is a public art school in Jonava, Lithuania. Founded in 1965 as a music school, it added applied arts classes in 1982, choreography in 1992 and drama studies in 1993. In 1990, the school was relocated to the old town of Jonava. In 1994, the school received the status of an art school status and was renamed after Janina Miščiukaitė in 2009.
