= A Grupė =

- Founded: 1947
- Country: Lithuania
- Confederation: CEV
- Number of clubs: 4
- Level on pyramid: 1
- Current champions: Achema-KKSC ( Jonava)

The A Grupė is highest level of women's volleyball club tournament in Lithuania. Current champions is Achema-KKSC from Jonava.

== History ==
From 1935 to 1943 Volleyball Championships of Kaunas City was held. First national-wide championships were held in 1947. Teams from Kaunas won the most titles.

== Teams ==
Name	City
Achema-KKSC	Jonava
Heksa	Kaunas
SM Tauras VTC	Vilnius
TK LSU	Kaunas
