= Vydas Dolinskas =

Lithuanian art critic and art historian

Vydas Dolinskas (born 1970 in Jonava) is a Lithuanian art critic, art historian, director of Palace of the Grand Dukes of Lithuania.

Dolinskas went to Jonava 3rd Middle School from 1977 to 1988. 1988–1993 he studied at the Faculty of History at Vilnius University. In 1992, he studied at the University of Salzburg, Faculty of Humanities and Art History Institute. From 1993 to 1998 he was a doctoral student at Vilnius University. Dolinskas defended his doctoral thesis about Simonas Kosakovskis. Since 1996, he was a lecturer at Vilnius University, Faculty of History. Since 2009, he was director of Palace of the Grand Dukes of Lithuania.

Since 1994, he published more than 100 scientific, popular science and informational publications, translations from German and Polish languages in Lithuanian.

== Bibliography ==
- Simonas Kosakovskis. Politinė ir karinė veikla Lietuvos Didžiojoje Kunigaikštystėje 1763–1794 m., Vilnius, 2003
