= Taurosta Bridge =

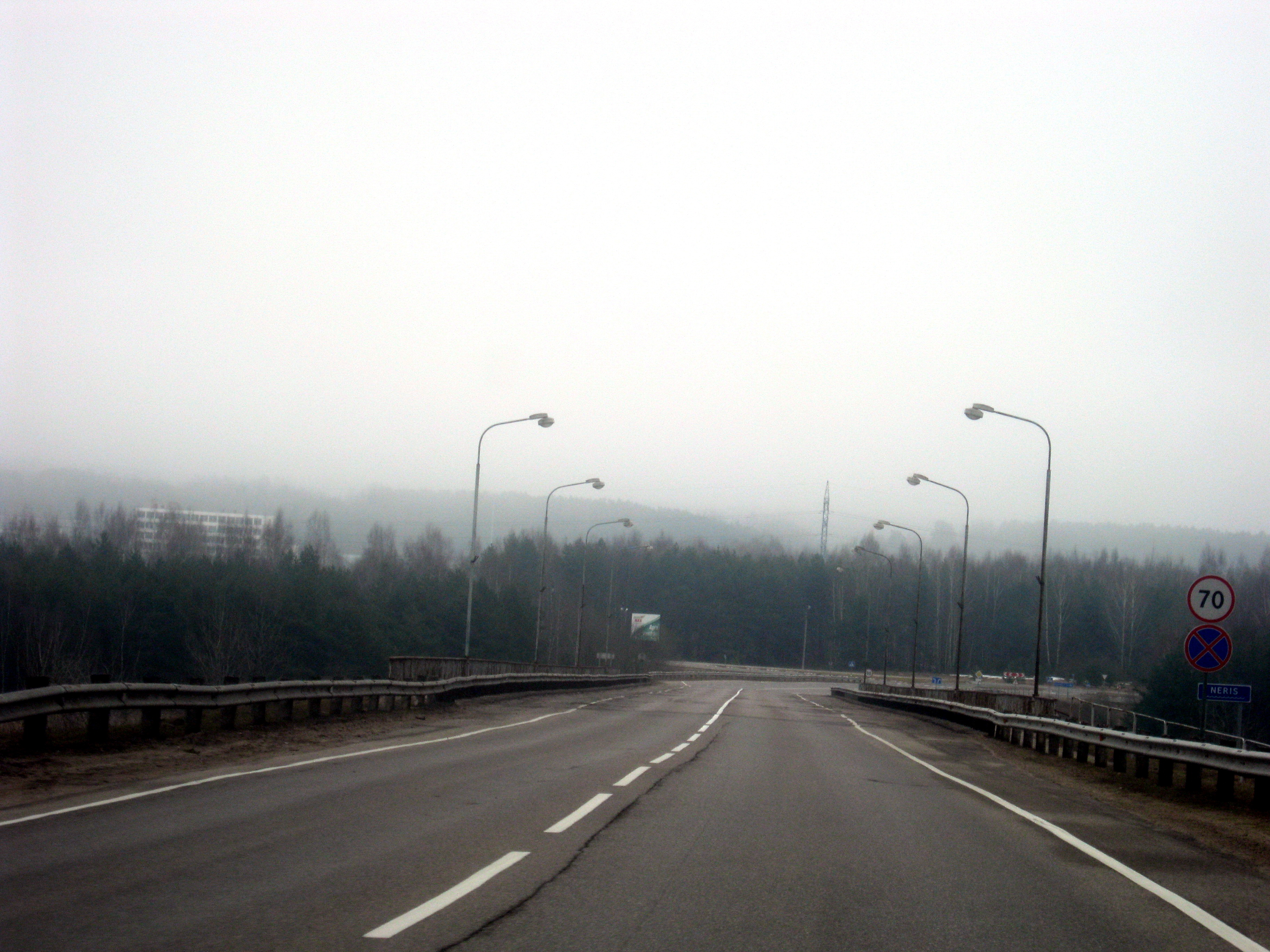
- Coordinates: 55°5′14″N 24°18′55″E
- Crosses: Neris
- Locale: Jonava
- Official name: Taurostos tiltas

History
- Opened: 1986

The Taurosta Bridge (Lithuanian: Taurostos tiltas) is a bridge in Jonava, Lithuania, over which the A6 highway crosses the Neris river. It is the only bridge in the city that can be used by big trucks.
