= Lampėdžiai Bridge =

Bridge in Kaunas, Lithuania

Coordinates: 54°54′24.41″N 23°50′2.87″E

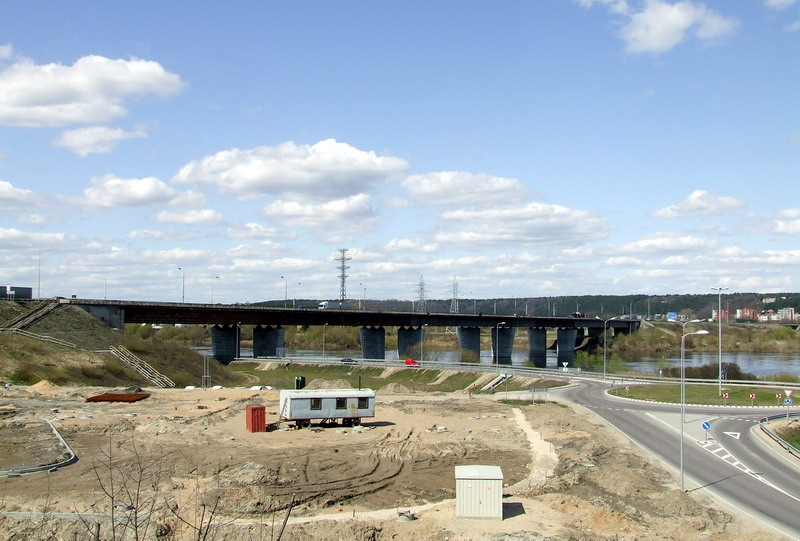
Lampėdžiai Bridge

Lampėdžiai Bridge (Lithuanian: Lampėdžių tiltas) is a bridge in Kaunas, Lithuania. It crosses the Nemunas River to connect Marvelė in Aleksotas district and Lampėdžiai neighbourhood in Vilijampolė elderate. The bridge is 446 metres in length. It carries four lanes of automobile traffic, with two lanes in each direction. The bridge, completed in 1997, is also named after a Lithuanian roadman Česlovas Radzinauskas. Lampėdžiai Bridge is a part of Via Baltica and A5 highway of Lithuania, and western bypass of Kaunas.
