= Baltic Women's Volleyball League =

- Sport: Volleyball
- Founded: 2007
- No. of teams: 10
- Country: Estonia; Latvia; Lithuania
- Most recent champions: (Lithuania) TK Kaunas VDU (2022, 2nd title)
- Most titles: (Estonia) Kohila Võrkpalliklubi (3 titles)

Baltic Women's Volleyball League is the top official competition for women's volleyball clubs in Baltic states (Estonia, Latvia and Lithuania). It started in 2007 with only Estonian and Latvian teams participating, Lithuanian teams joined the following 2007–08 season.

== See also ==
- Baltic Men Volleyball League
