= Jonava =

Town in Aukštaitija Region, Lithuania

- City
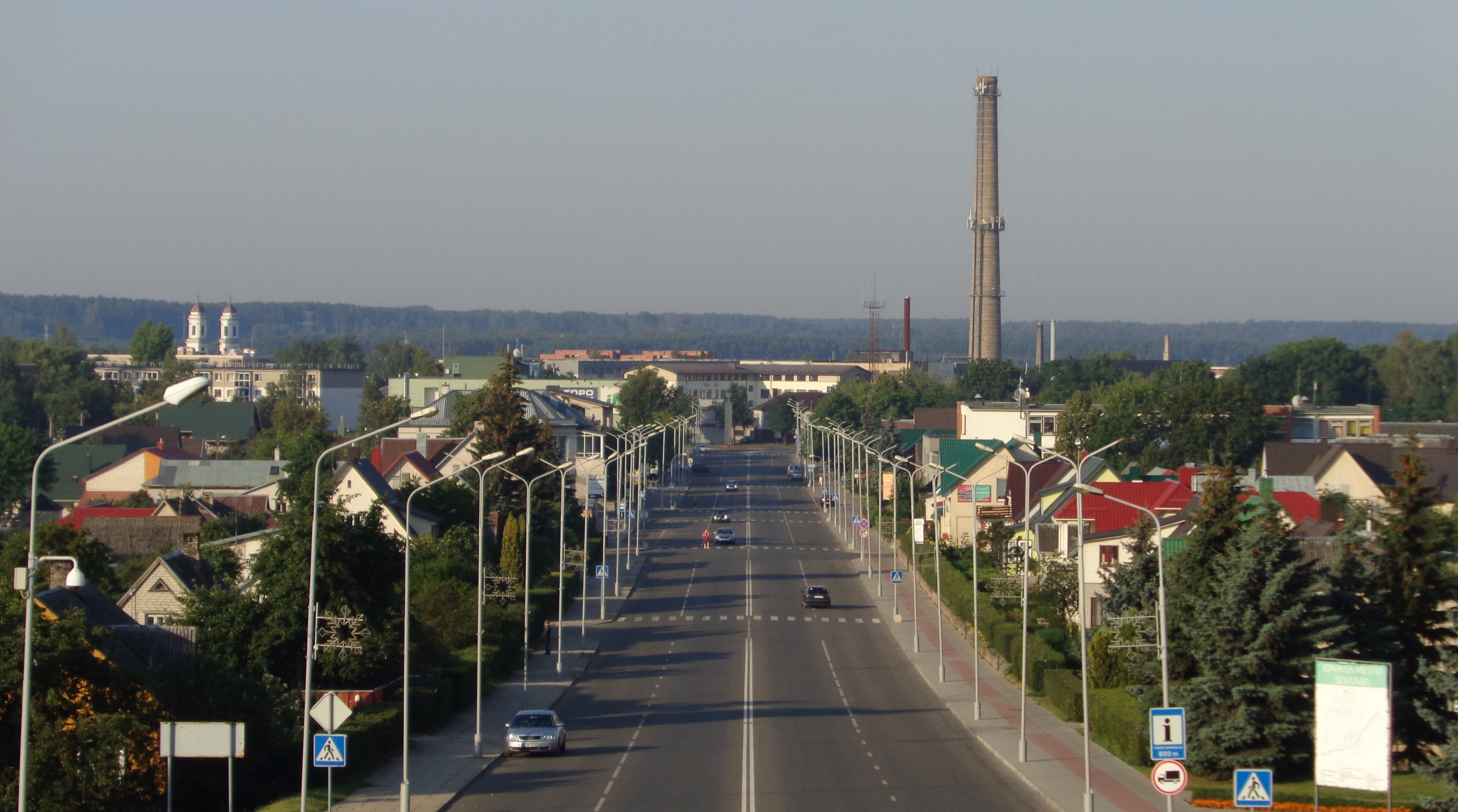
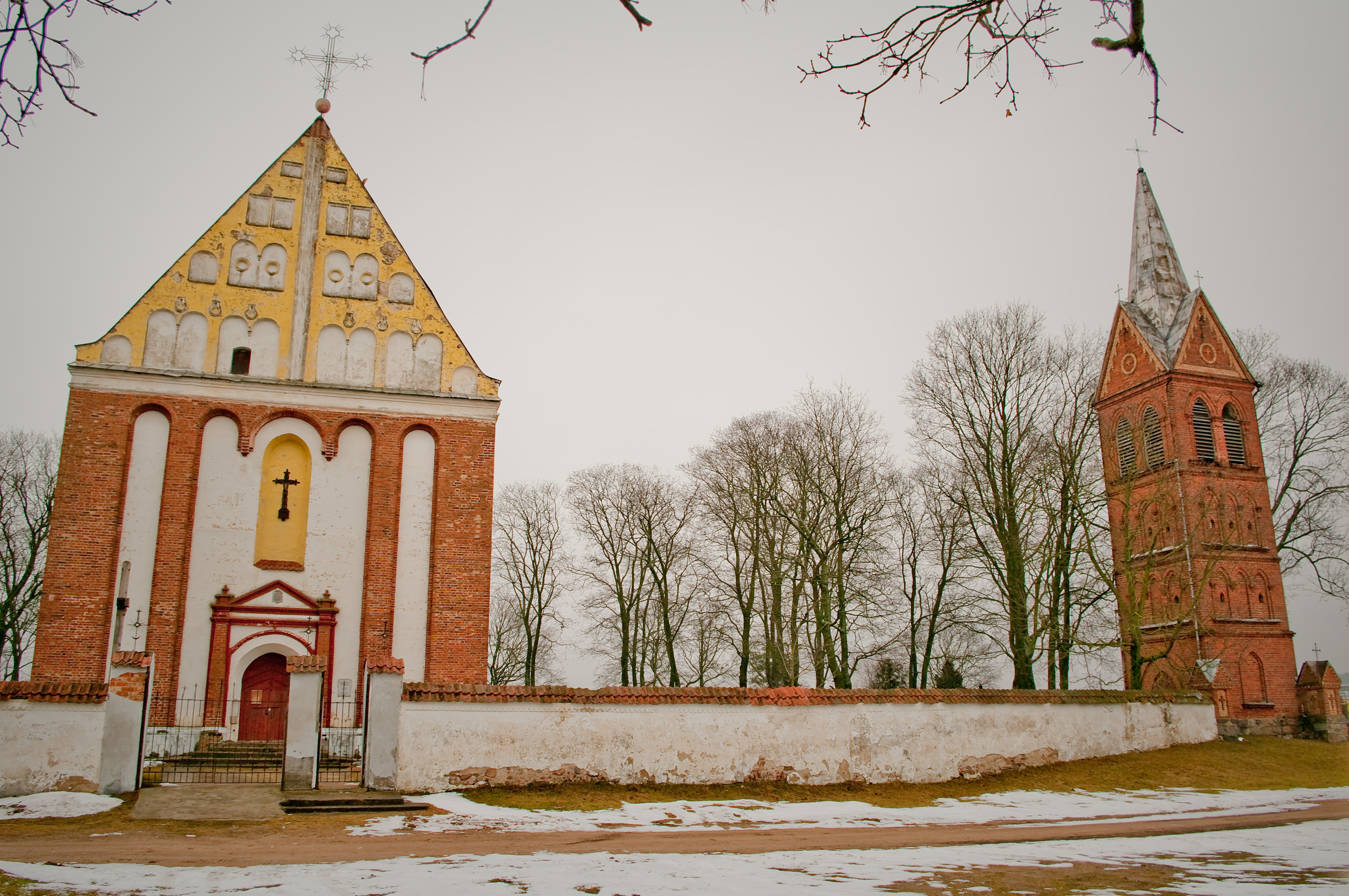
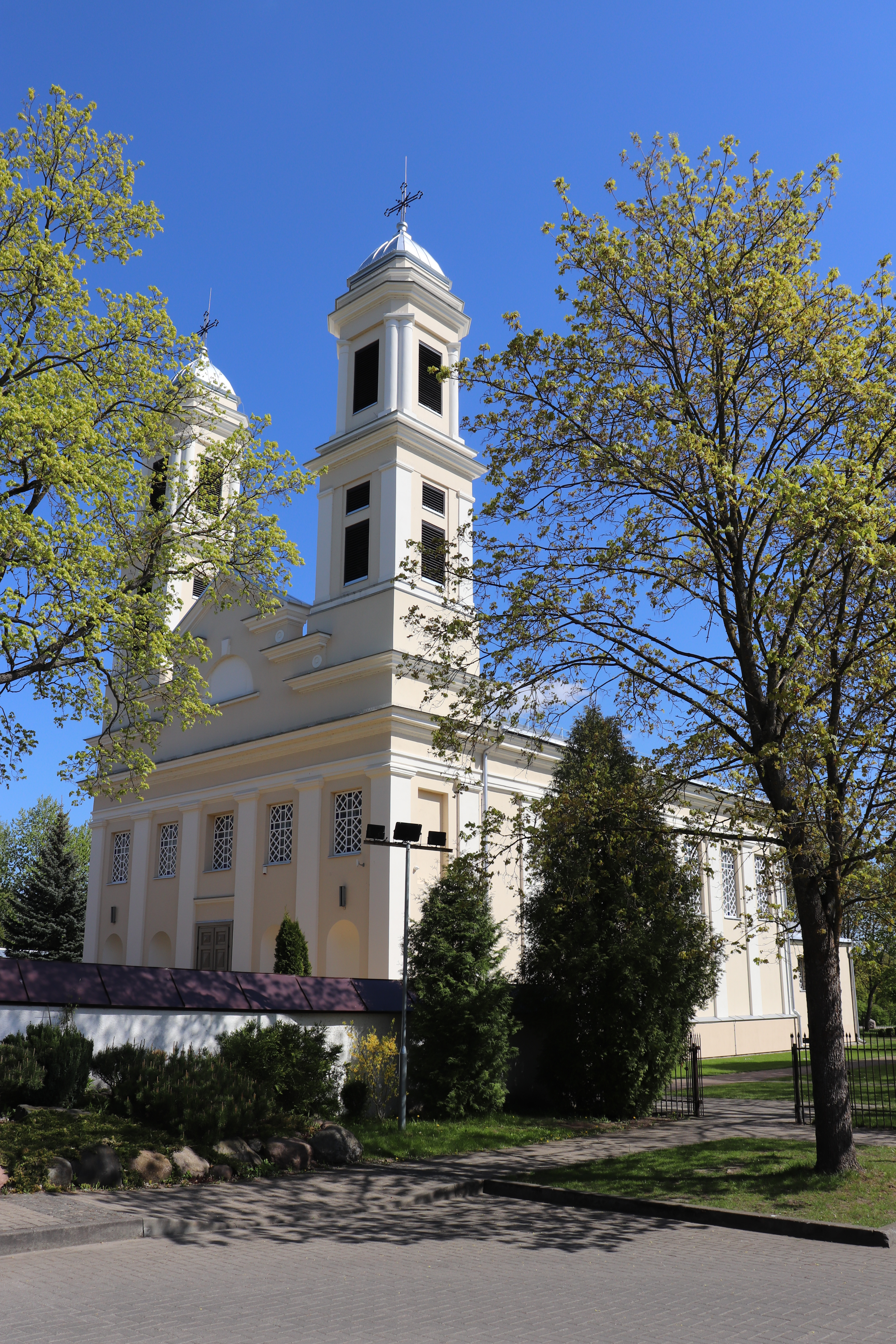
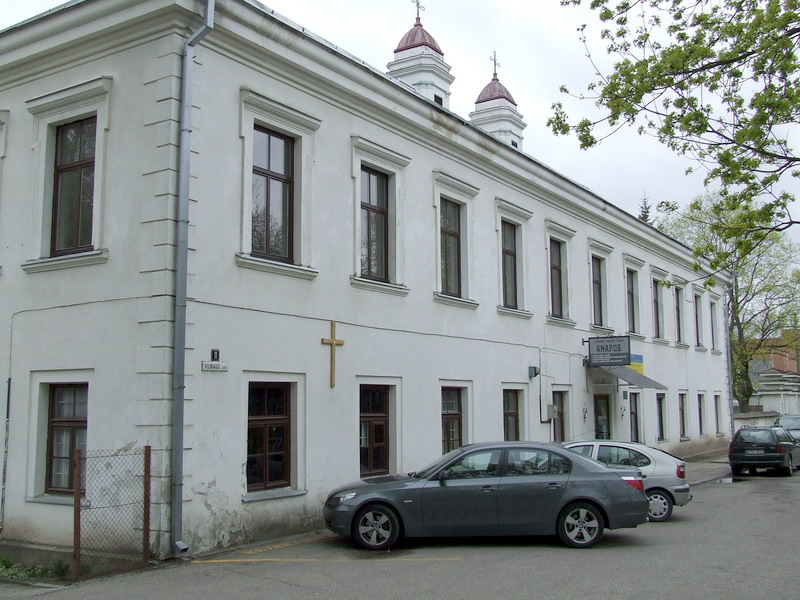
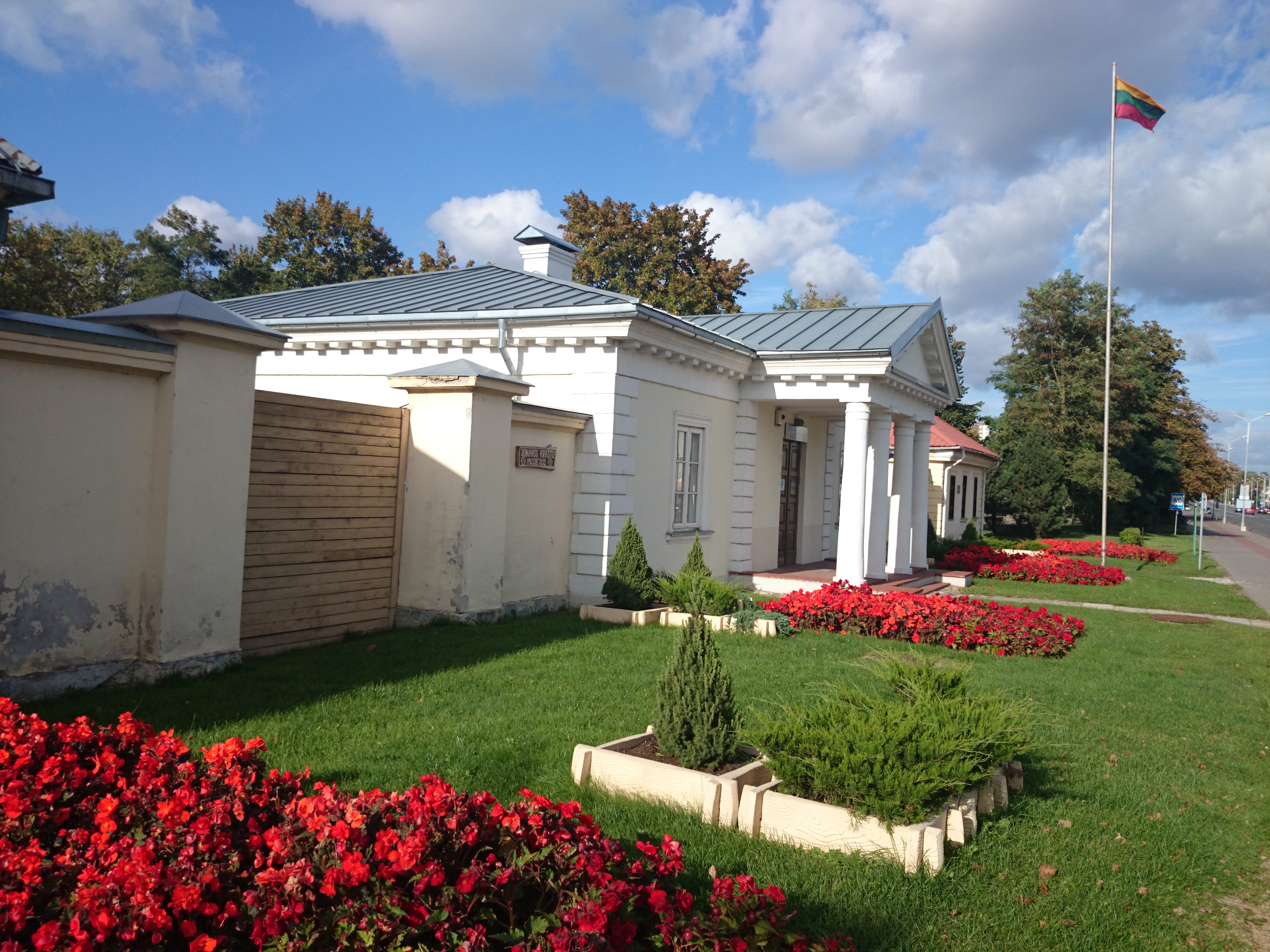
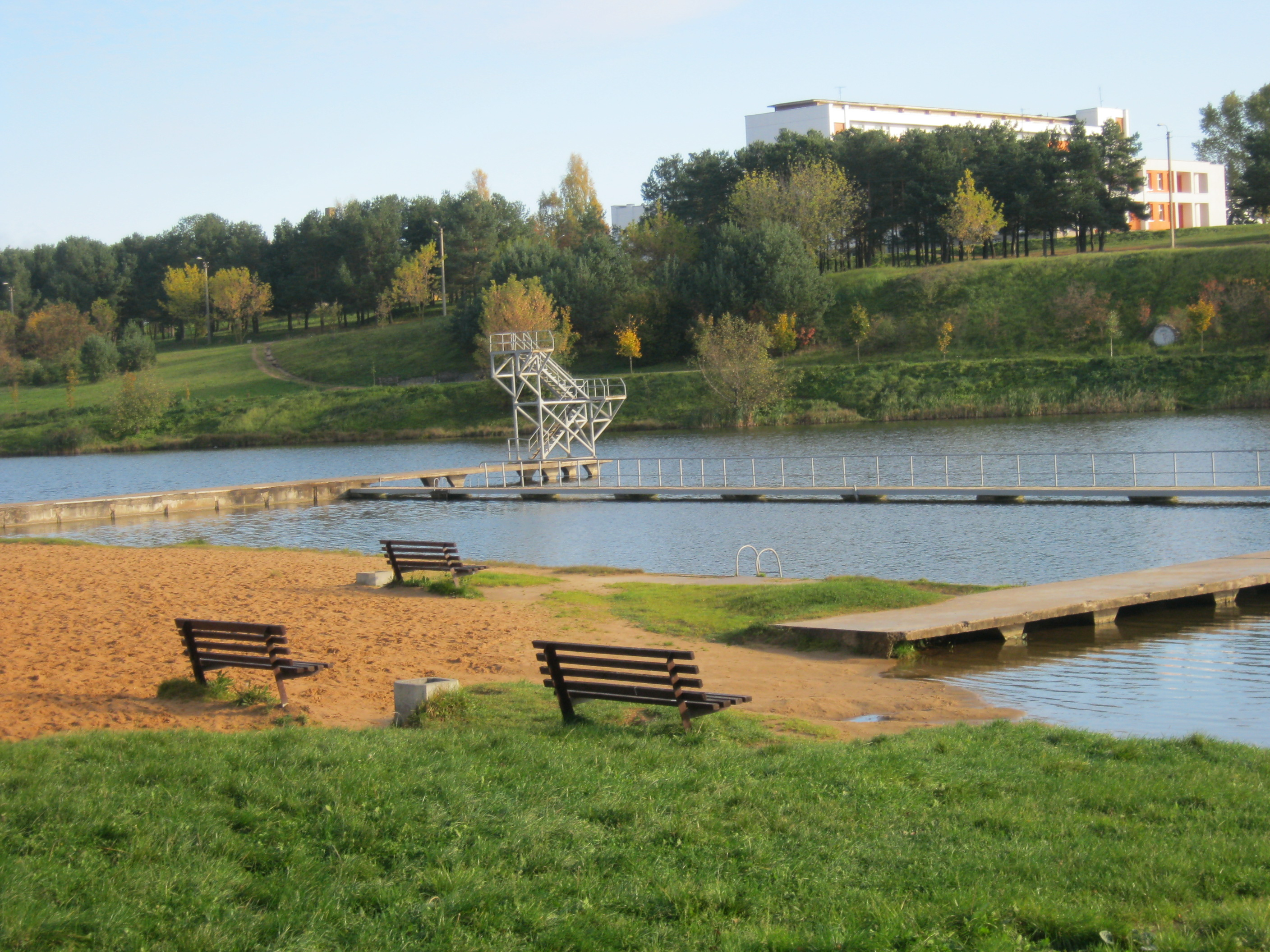
- Panorama of Jonava Church of St. Anne and its belfry Church of St. James the Apostle The former Trinitarians Monastery Jonava City Council Building and Abraomas Kulvietis Monument Jonava Regional Museum Jonava Beach

- Flag Coat of arms Brandmark
- Nickname: Jonų ir Janinų sostinė (The capital of Jonai and Janinos)
- Location of Jonava in Lithuania Location of Jonava within the Baltics Location of Jonava in Europe
- Coordinates: 55°4′20″N 24°16′50″E
- Country: Lithuania
- Ethnographic region: Aukštaitija
- County: Kaunas County
- Municipality: Jonava district municipality
- Eldership: Jonava City Eldership
- Capital of: Jonava district municipality Jonava town eldership
- First mentioned: 1740
- Granted city rights: 1864

Area
  - Total: 13.6682 km^{2} (5.2773 sq mi)
- Elevation: 65 m (213 ft)

Population (2020)
  - Total: 26,423
  - Density: 1,933.2/km^{2} (5,006.9/sq mi)
- Demonym(s): Jonavan(s) (English) jonaviečiai (Lithuanian)
- Time zone: UTC+2 (EET)
  - Summer (DST): UTC+3 (EEST)
- Postal code: 55xxx
- Website: jonava.lt

Jonava is the ninth largest city in Lithuania with a population of c. 30,000. It is located in Kaunas County in central Lithuania, 30 km (19 mi) north east of Kaunas, the second-largest city in Lithuania. It is served by Kaunas International Airport. Achema, the largest fertilizer factory in the Baltic states, is located nearby the city.

The city is sometimes called "the capital of midsummer holiday" (Lithuanian: Joninės). Thousands of locals and visitors annually celebrate the midsummer festival in Jonava. Each year during the midsummer holiday Jonava is declared a one-day 'Republic of Johns' (Lithuanian: Jonų Respublika). The Jonava's Republic of Johns has thousands of citizens not only from Lithuania, but also from many foreign countries (e.g. Poland, Croatia, Austria, Mexico, Italy, United States, etc.). Only those who provide documents proving that their names are John (Lithuanian: Jonas) or Janina are eligible to apply for the citizenship of the Republic of Johns.

== Etymology ==
Dominik Kossakowski, the founder of the town of Jonava and the Stalininkas of Samogitia, named the town "Janów" in honour of his father Jan Mikołaj Kossowski when he established the town next to the Skaruliai Manor. In other languages the town is known as: Yiddish: יאָנאווא, romanized: Yonava; Polish: Janów; German: Janau.

== History ==
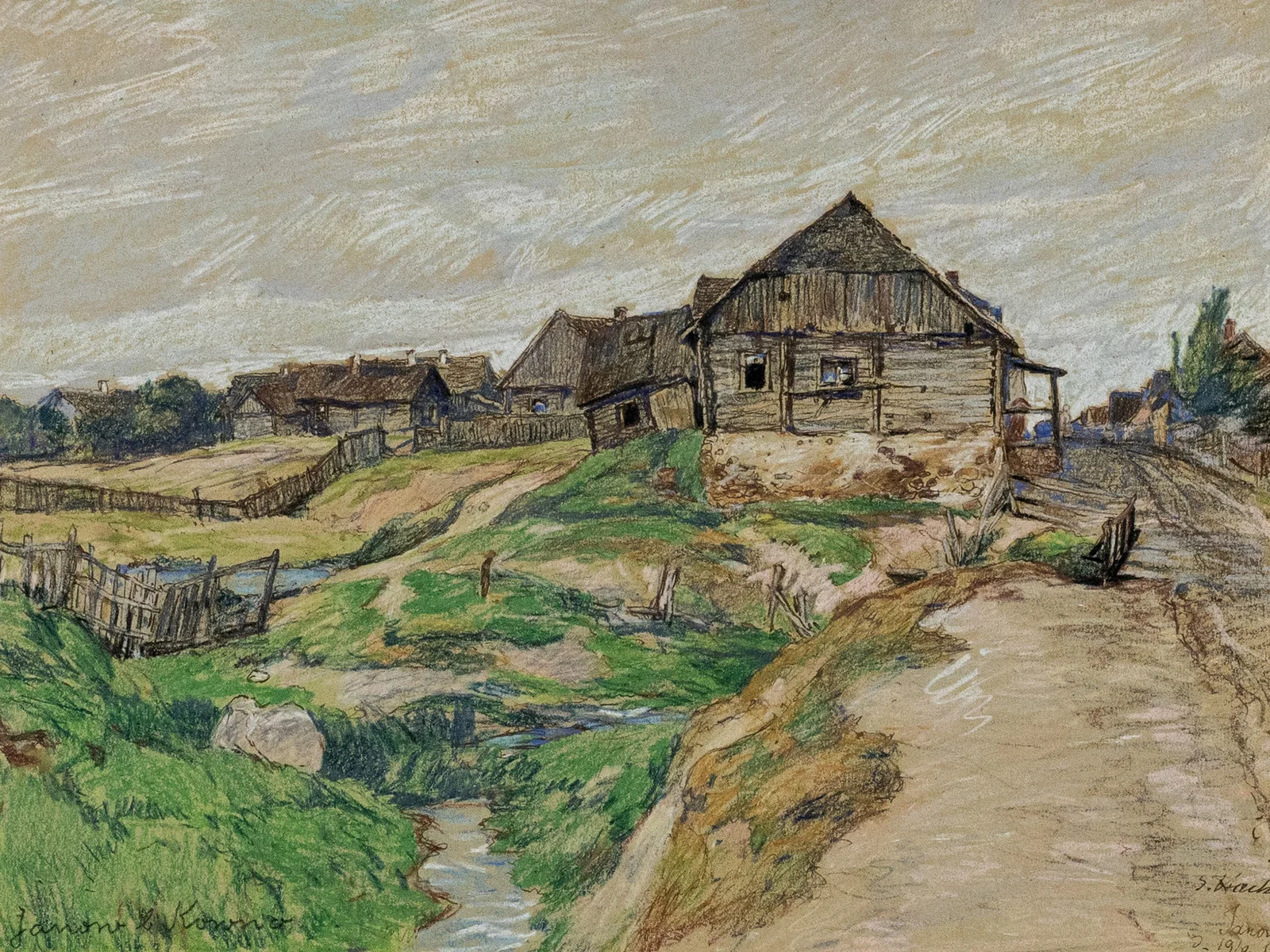
Depiction of Jonava in 1915

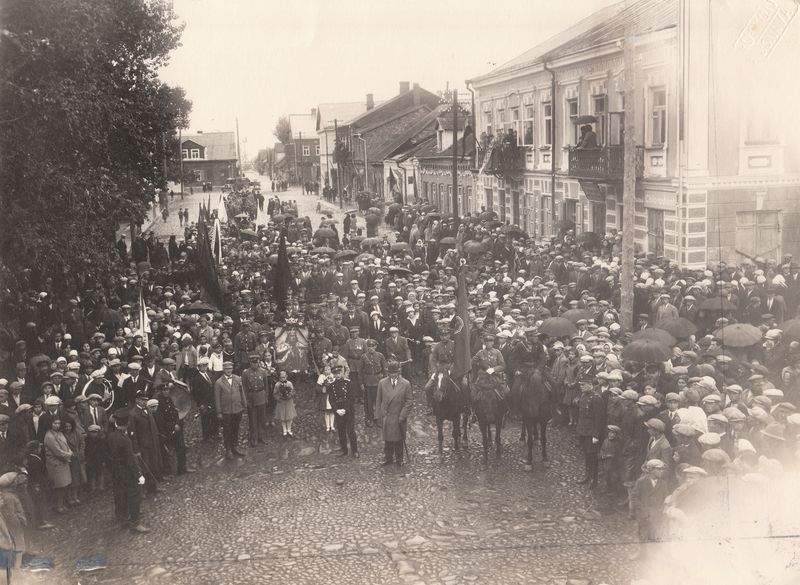
Commemoration of the 500th anniversary of the death of Vytautas the Great in Jonava in 1930

Jonava was officially established as a city in the 18th century during the times of the Polish–Lithuanian Commonwealth. In 1750, the first wooden church was built in Jonava. In 1778, a beer brewery was operating in the town. Around 1812, Napoleon and his army invaded the town and its surrounding villages. In 1923, Jonava was officially recognised as a city-status settlement and in 1950 it became the centre of the municipality.

The city had a large Jewish population before World War II. In 1893, 92% of the population was Jewish and in 1941 it was 80%. In 1932 there were 250 shops owned by Jewish families, a Jewish bank, 7 synagogues and a Jewish school. During World War II Jonava was attacked by Nazi Germany. A Christian church and five Jewish synagogues were destroyed. The Jews of the city were killed in two massacres, in August and September 1941. A total of 2,108 people were executed by an Einsatzgruppen of Germans and Lithuanian Self-Defence Units. 200 remaining Jews were kept prisoners at the Kaunas ghetto.

After the war, the city built the largest fertilizer factory in the Baltic states and Jonava become one of the 4 biggest industrial cities in Lithuania.

== Environmental catastrophe ==
Pool in Jonava

Janina Miščiukaitė School of Art

An explosion occurred in the chemical fertilizers factory on 20 March 1989, causing a leakage of nearly 7,500 tonnes of liquid ammonia. The catastrophe developed further into a fire within the nitrophosphate facility and fertilizer storehouses polluting the atmosphere with products of their combustion, such as nitrous oxide and chlorine. The toxic cloud drifted towards Ukmergė, Širvintos and Kėdainiai. The concentration of ammonia surpassed the permissible level by a factor of 150 in Upninkai, at 10 km from the disaster site. One day after the accident, a toxic cloud 7 km wide and 50 km long was recorded between Jonava and Kėdainiai. Seven people died during the fire and leakage of ammonia immediately afterward, 29 people became handicapped, and a large number of people suffered from acute respiratory and cardiac attacks. The true extent of damages and health impact from the event is however unknown. What is known is that exposure to ammonia prenatally, especially at a young age can cause serious brain damage.

== Administrative divisions ==
Jonava is divided into 13 city regions:

- Senamiestis
- Girelė
- Miškų ūkis
- Paneriai
- Lietava
- Lakštingalos
- Juodmena
- Geležinkelio stotis
- Baldininkai
- Rimkai
- Kosmonautai
- Skaruliai
- Virbalai

== Demography ==
=== Population ===
According to the 2021 census, the city population was 27,381 people, of which:

- Lithuanians – 88.03% (24,104)
- Russians – 7.14% (1,956)
- Poles – 1.19% (327)
- Ukrainians – 0.76% (207)
- Belarusians – 0.59% (161)
- Others / did not specify – 2.28% (624)

Historical population

Year	Pop.	±% p.a.
1823	600	—
1851	1,560	+3.47%
1897	5,000	+2.56%
1904	5,622	+1.69%
1923	4,115	−1.63%
1959	5,005	+0.55%

Year	Pop.	±% p.a.
1970	14,563	+10.20%
1979	28,413	+7.71%
1989	36,520	+2.54%
2001	34,954	−0.36%
2011	30,777	−1.26%
2020	26,423	−1.68%

Source: 1902, 1923, 1959 & 1970, 1979, 1989, 2001, 2011

== Sport ==
The city has its own "physical culture and sports center" with stadium, swimming pool and indoor arena. It has already been announced that the city is going to build a new large indoor arena "BC Jonava".

=== Football ===
Jonava has 2 soccer teams

- FK Jonava is playing in the A Lyga – First Football Division of Lithuania
- FK Jonava B - second team of FK Jonava, playing in the Third Division of Lithuania

=== Athletics ===
The marathon runners sport club Maratonas won 4 medals at Vilnius Marathon.

=== Basketball ===
Jonava Arena

Jonava has a basketball team, founded in 1969; Jonava SK Malsta playing in the National Basketball League (Nacionalinė Krepšinio Lyga). There is also a women's basketball team called BC Jonava which won bronze medals in the women's Second Basketball Division (Nacionalinė moterų krepšinio lyga).

=== Volleyball ===
Jonava has a strong women's volleyball team Achema-KKSC that playing in the highest league A Grupė. In 2010 Jonava held the international "Alfredas Ogonauskas Memorial Volleyball Championship".

=== Competitions ===
Jonava also hosts some less regular competitions. During the traditional midsummer holiday there was "Jonas's Republic President Cup" of Rally Slalom events. In summer seasons there are some occasional cycling tournaments or cross country competitions.

== Education ==
- Jonava adult education center
- Jonava Jeronimas Ralys Gymnasium
- Jonava Justinas Vareikis Progymnasium
- Jonava Lietava comprehensive school
- Jonava Neris comprehensive school
- Jonava Raimundas Samulevičius Progymnasium
- Jonava Old Town Gymnasium
- Janina Miščiukaitė art school

== Twin towns – sister cities ==
Jonava is twinned with:

- Děčín, Czech Republic
- Jõgeva, Estonia
- Kędzierzyn-Koźle, Poland
- Riihimäki, Finland
- Pucioasa, Romania
- Smila, Ukraine
- Tainan, Taiwan
- Vadul lui Vodă, Moldova
- (Georgia (country)) Zugdidi, Georgia

== Notable residents ==
- Linas Balčiūnas, (born 1978), olympic cyclist
- Arnoldas Burkovskis (born 1967), manager
- Vydas Dolinskas, (born 1970), art scientist
- Israel Davidson (1870–1939), writer
- Dominykas Galkevičius (born 1986), footballer
- S. J. Goldsmith (1915–1995), journalist and editor
- Sara Reveka Gourvitch or Gurvičaite (1860–1940), scientist who worked in Marie Curie's laboratory in Paris in 1920s
- Laurynas Gucevičius, architect
- Andrius Janukonis, (born 1971), businessman
- Grigorijus Kanovičius, (1929–2023), Jewish writer
- Dainius Kreivys, (born 1970), politician, Minister of Economy
- Juozapas Antanas Kosakovskis, general, Napoleon aide
- Darius Maskoliūnas, (born 1971), basketball player
- Abra Abrahamas Meirsonas, Harvard professor of neurosurgery
- Janina Miščiukaitė (1948–2008), singer
- Abraham Myerson, (1881–1948), neurologist, psychiatric, sociologist
- Jeronimas Ralys (1876–1921), translator and medic
- Ričardas Tamulis (1938–2008), boxer
- Artūras Zuokas, (born 1968), businessman, former Vilnius mayor

== Gallery ==
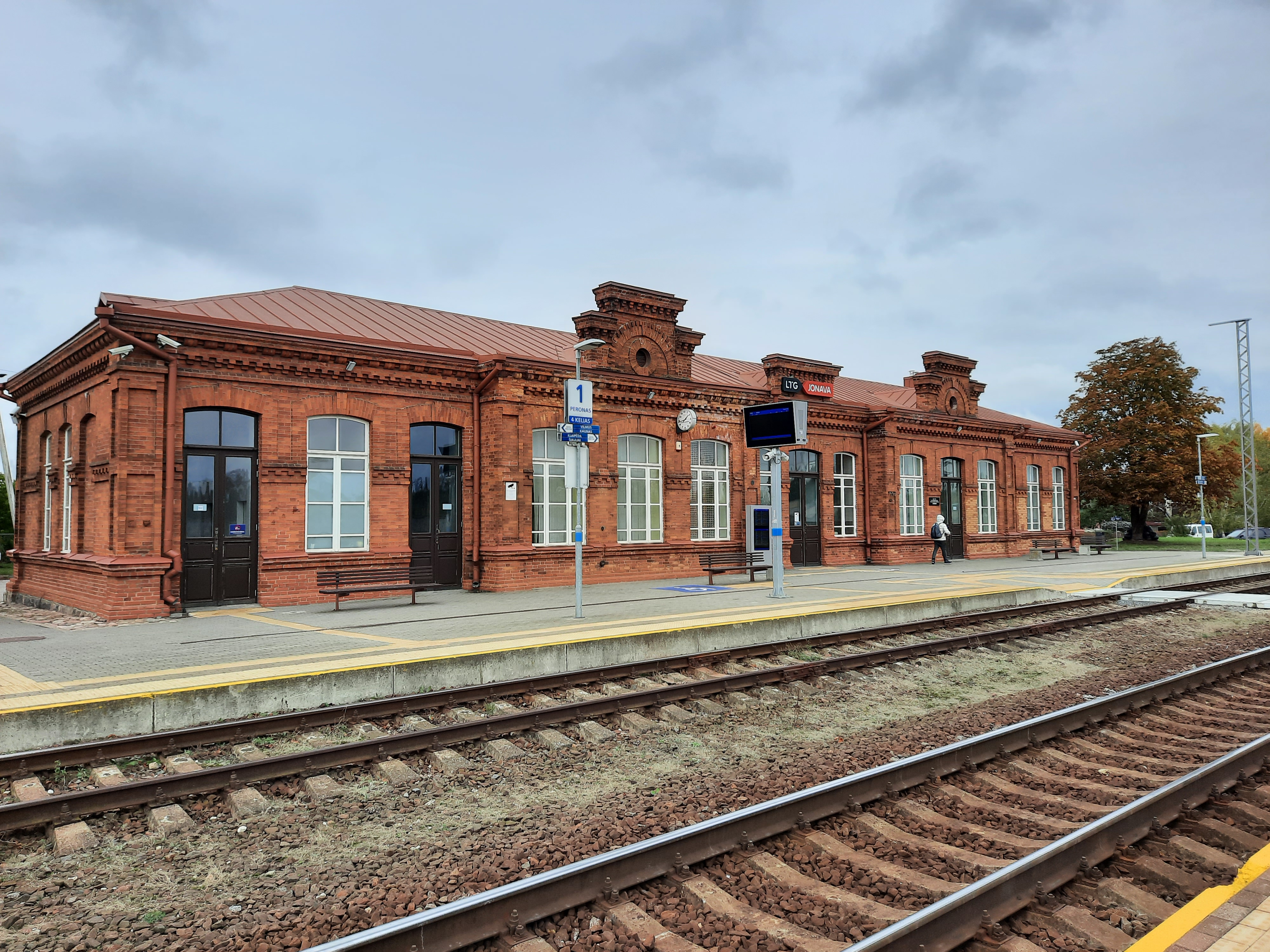
Jonava Railway Station

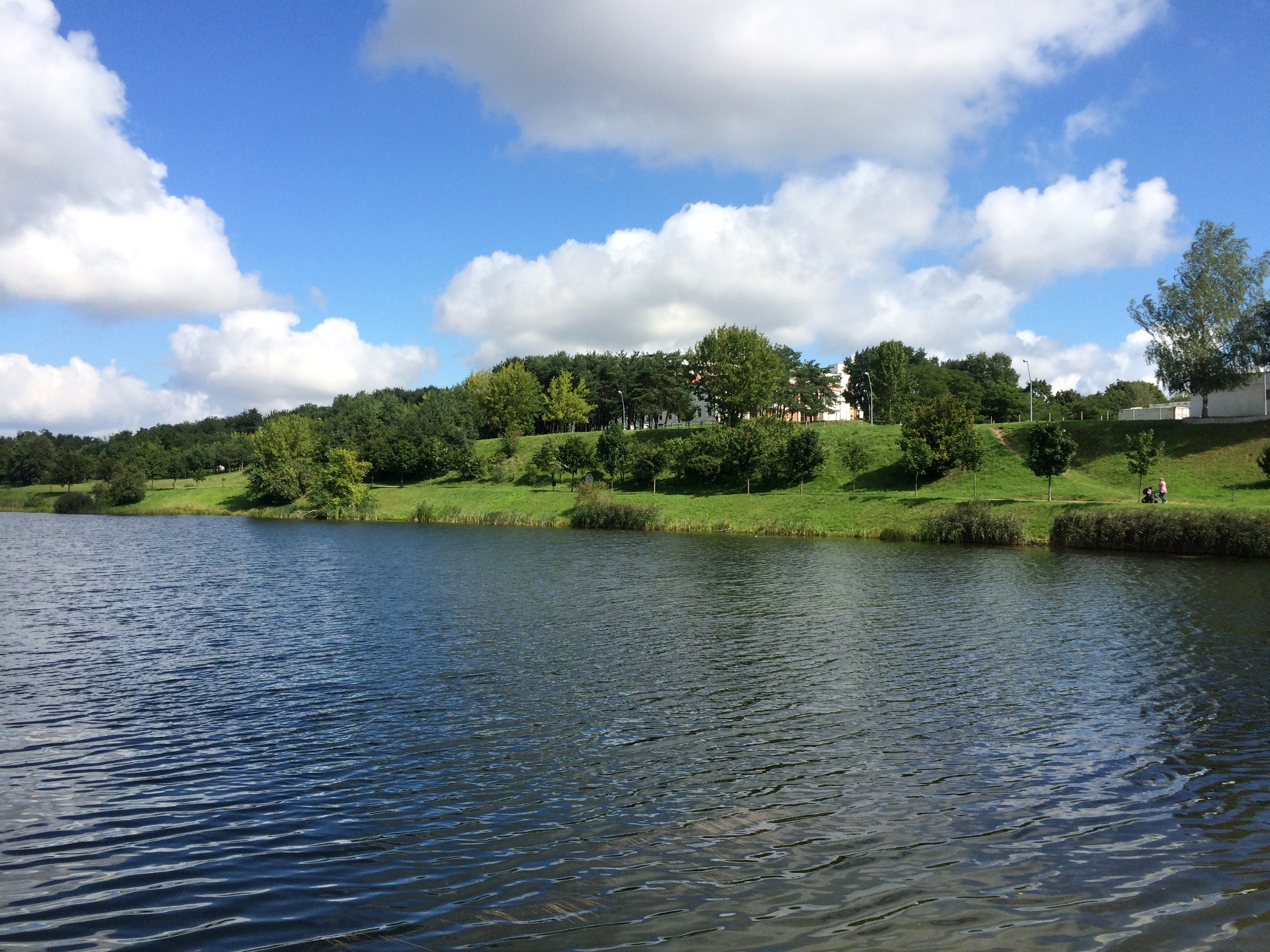
Pond in Jonava

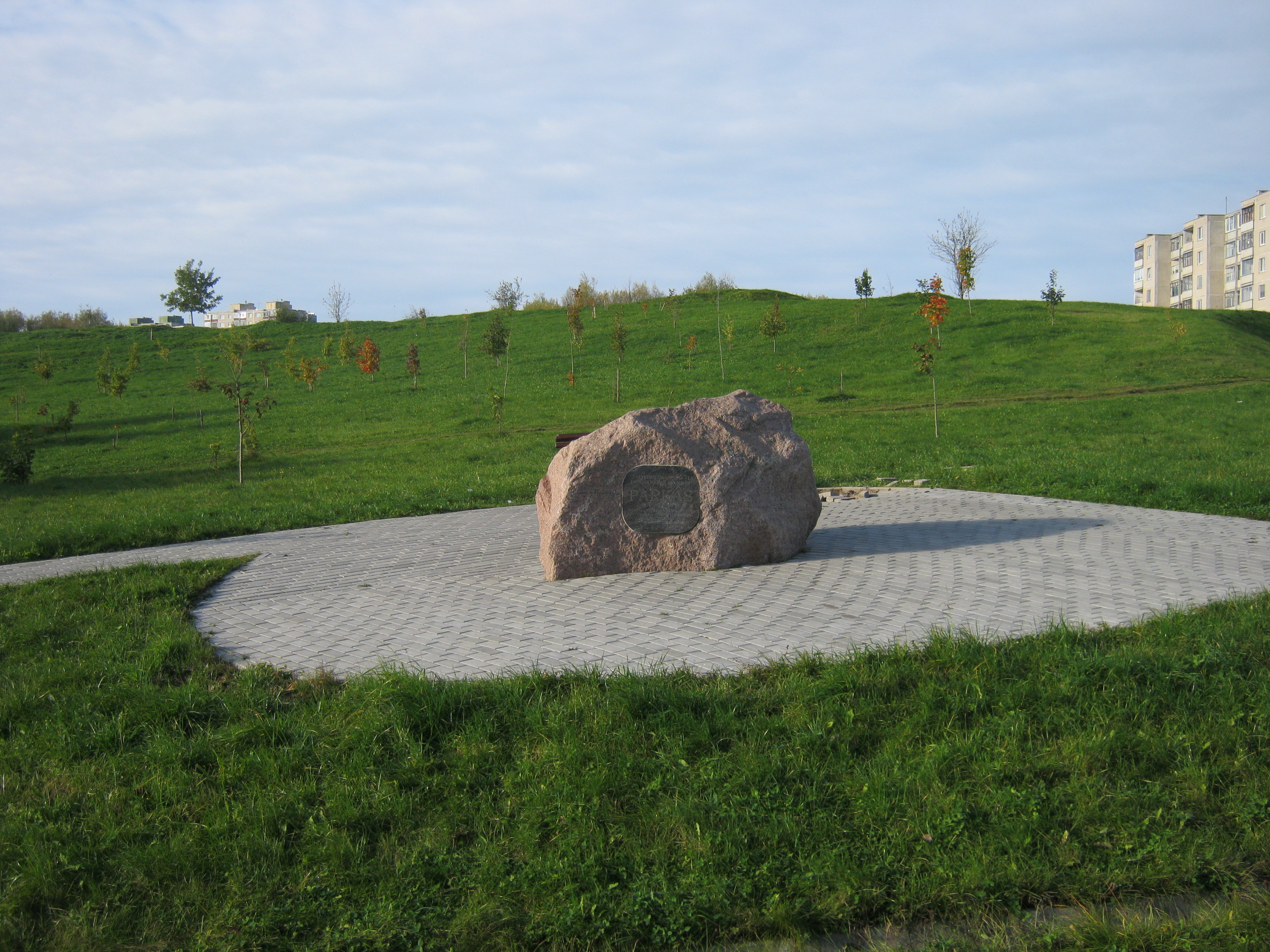
Bike lane with a monument

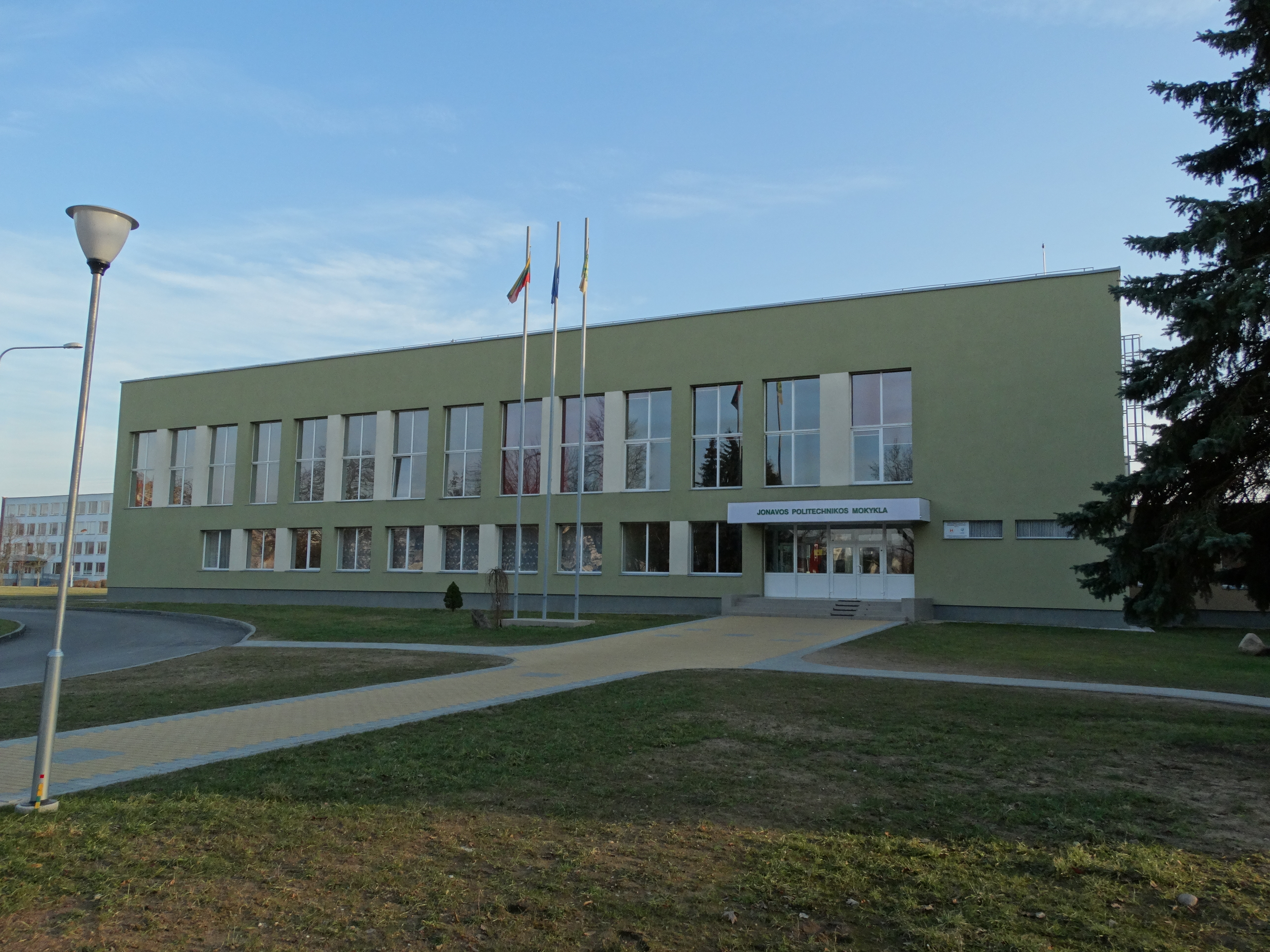
Polytechnic School of Jonava

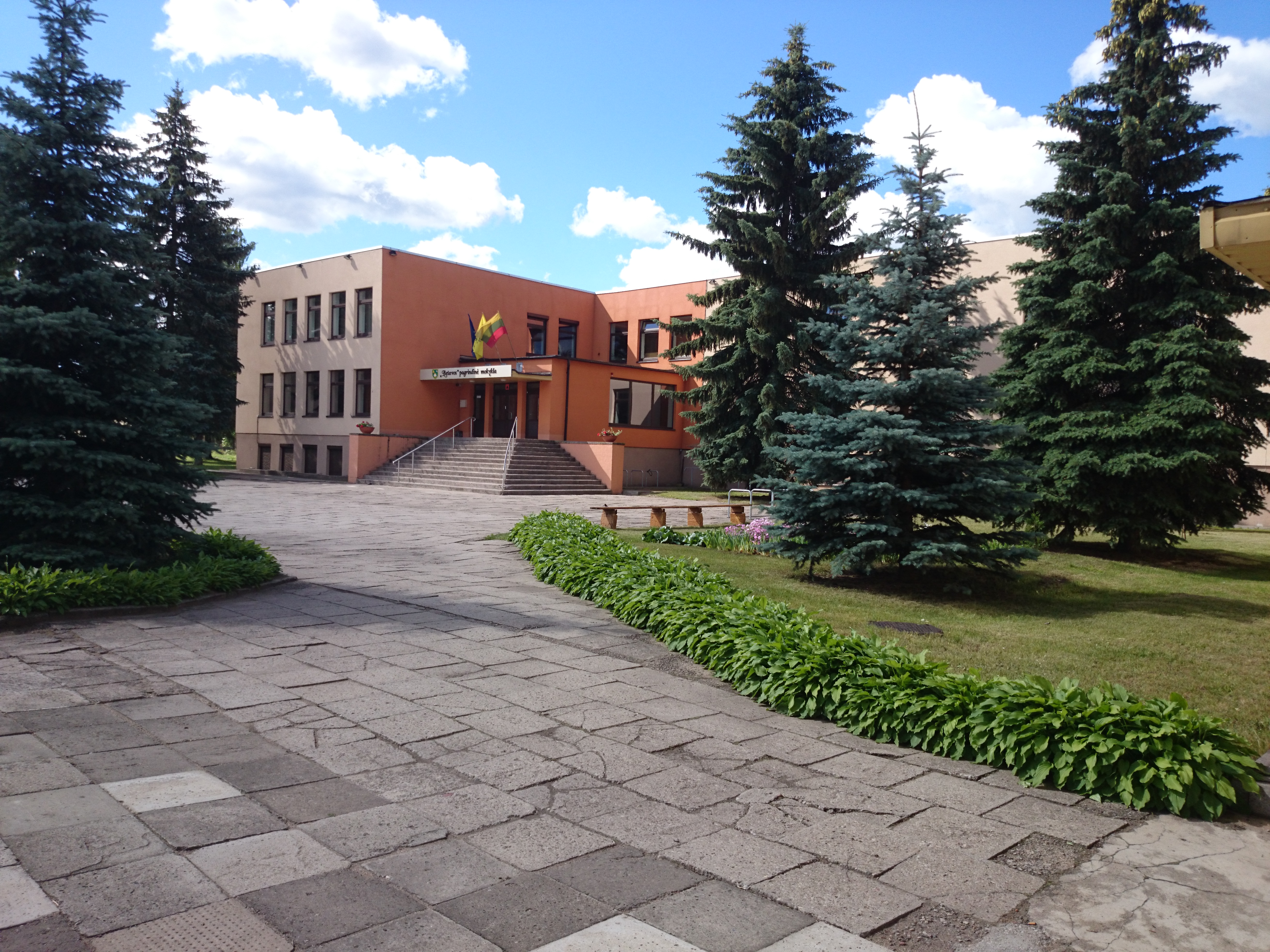
"Lietava" Secondary School

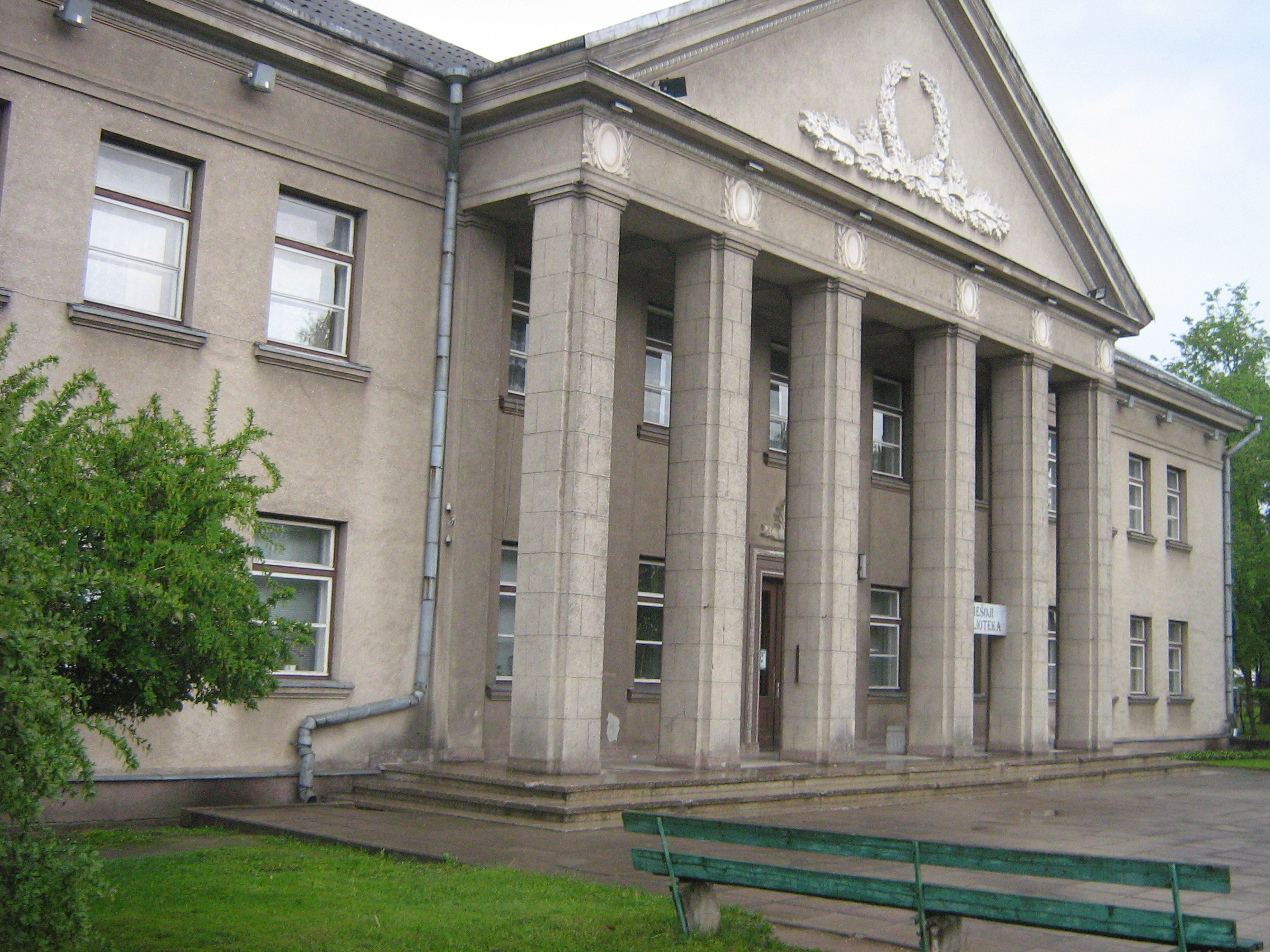
Library of Jonava

Jonava Culture Center

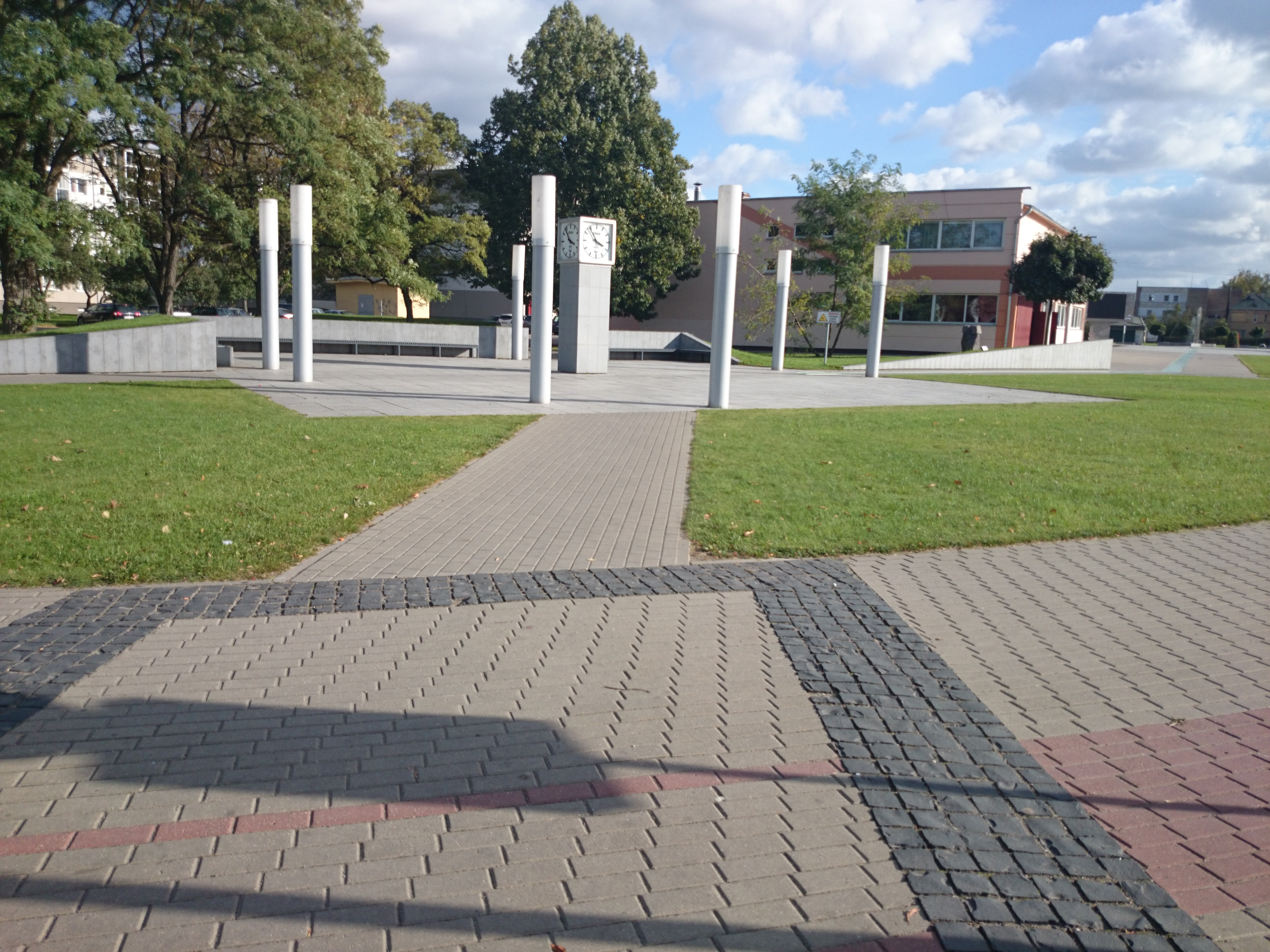
Jonas Basanavičius Street

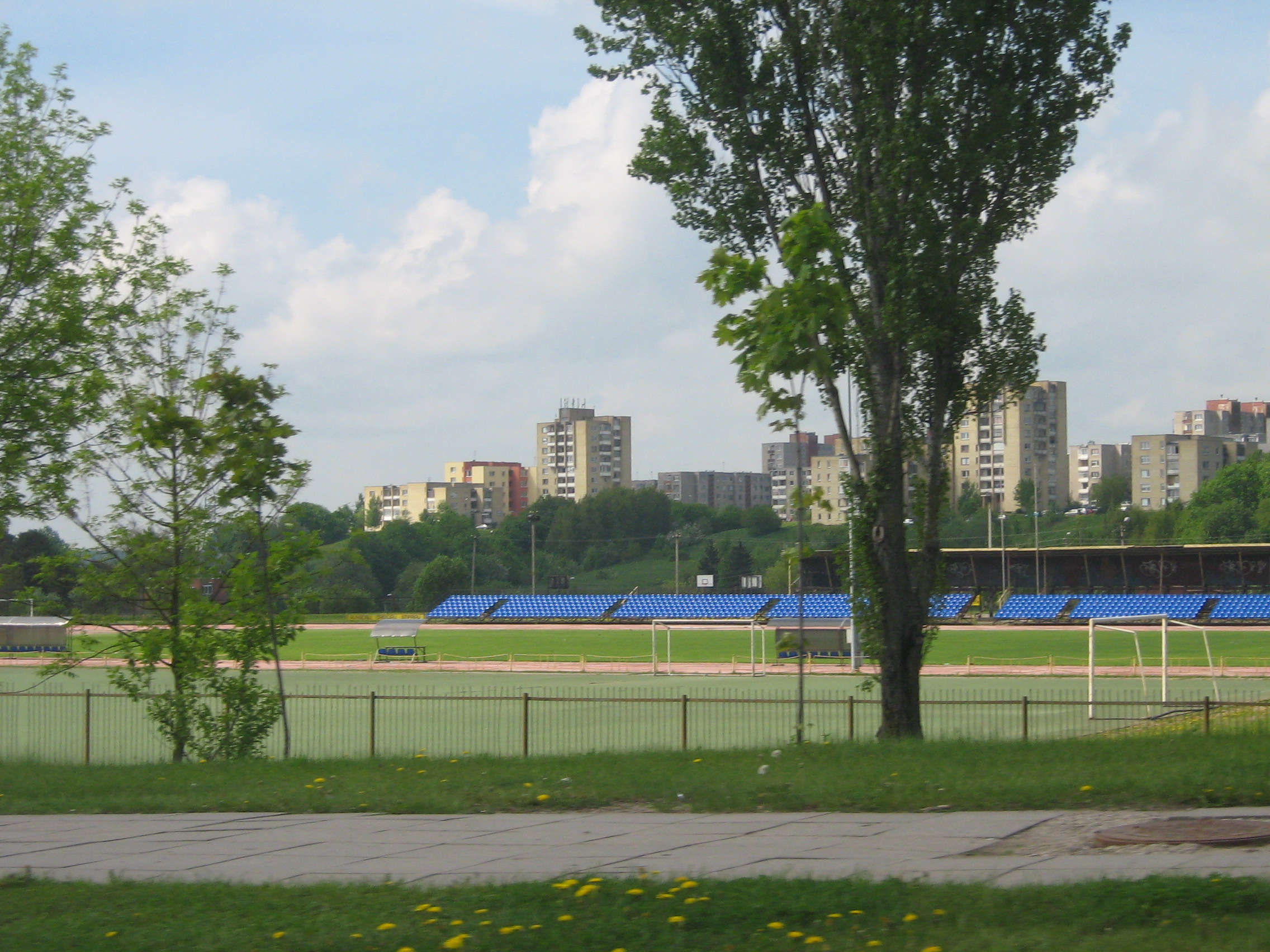
Central stadium of Jonava

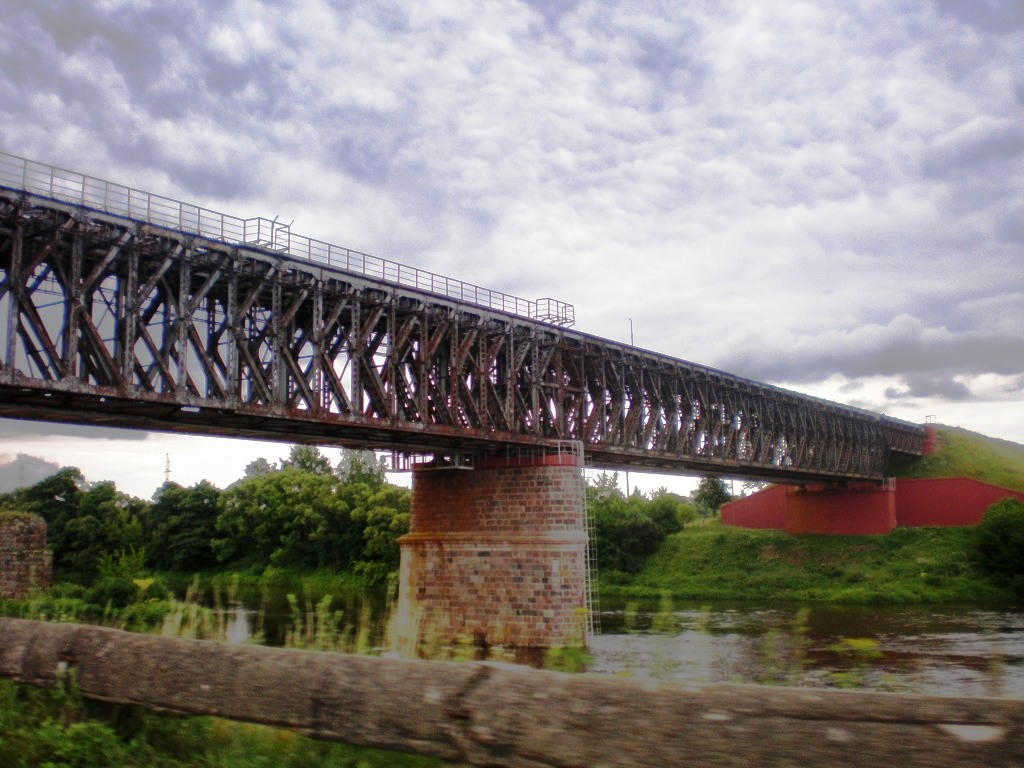
Railway bridge over Neris

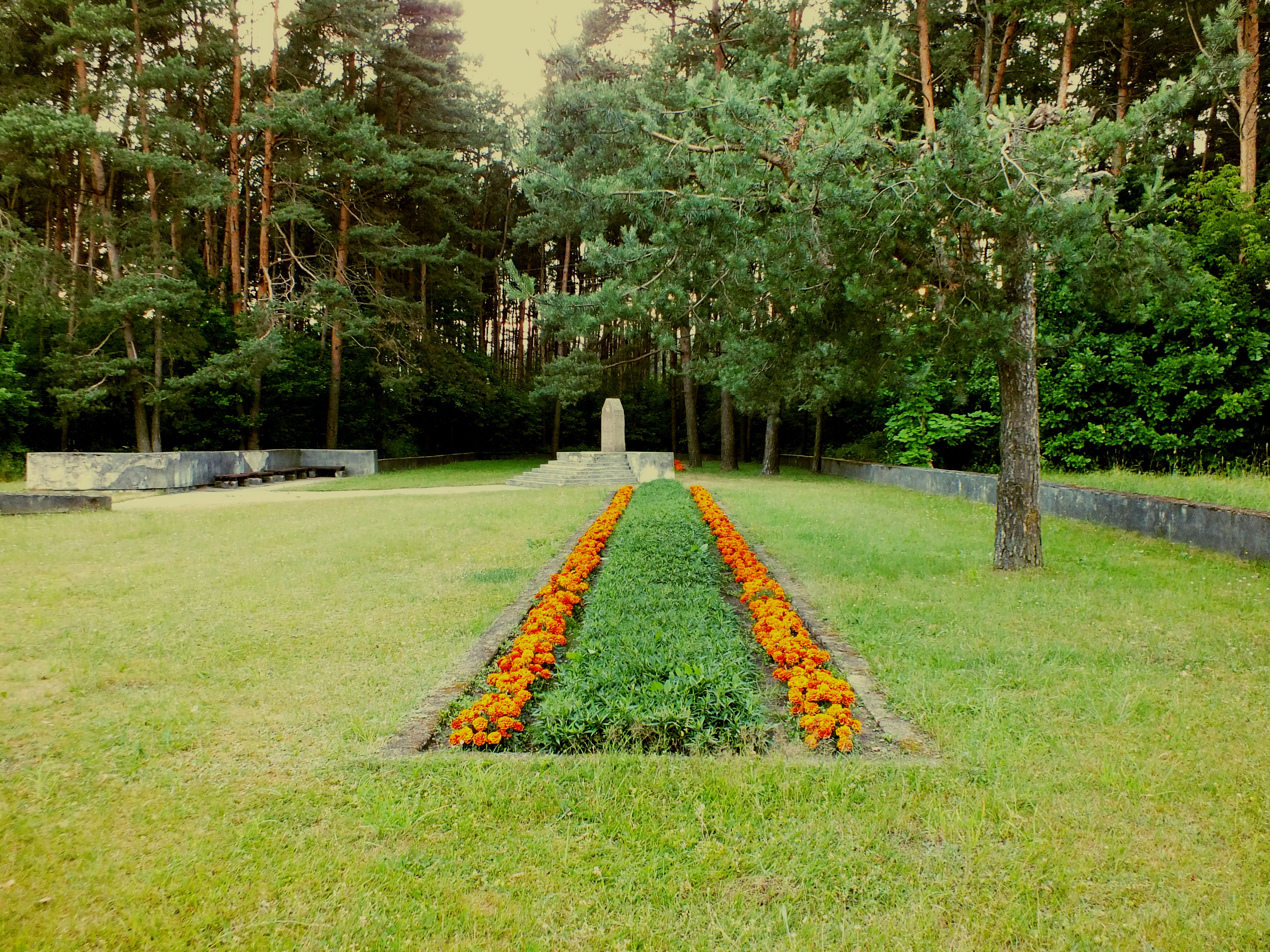
Monument for the Holocaust victims in Girelė village

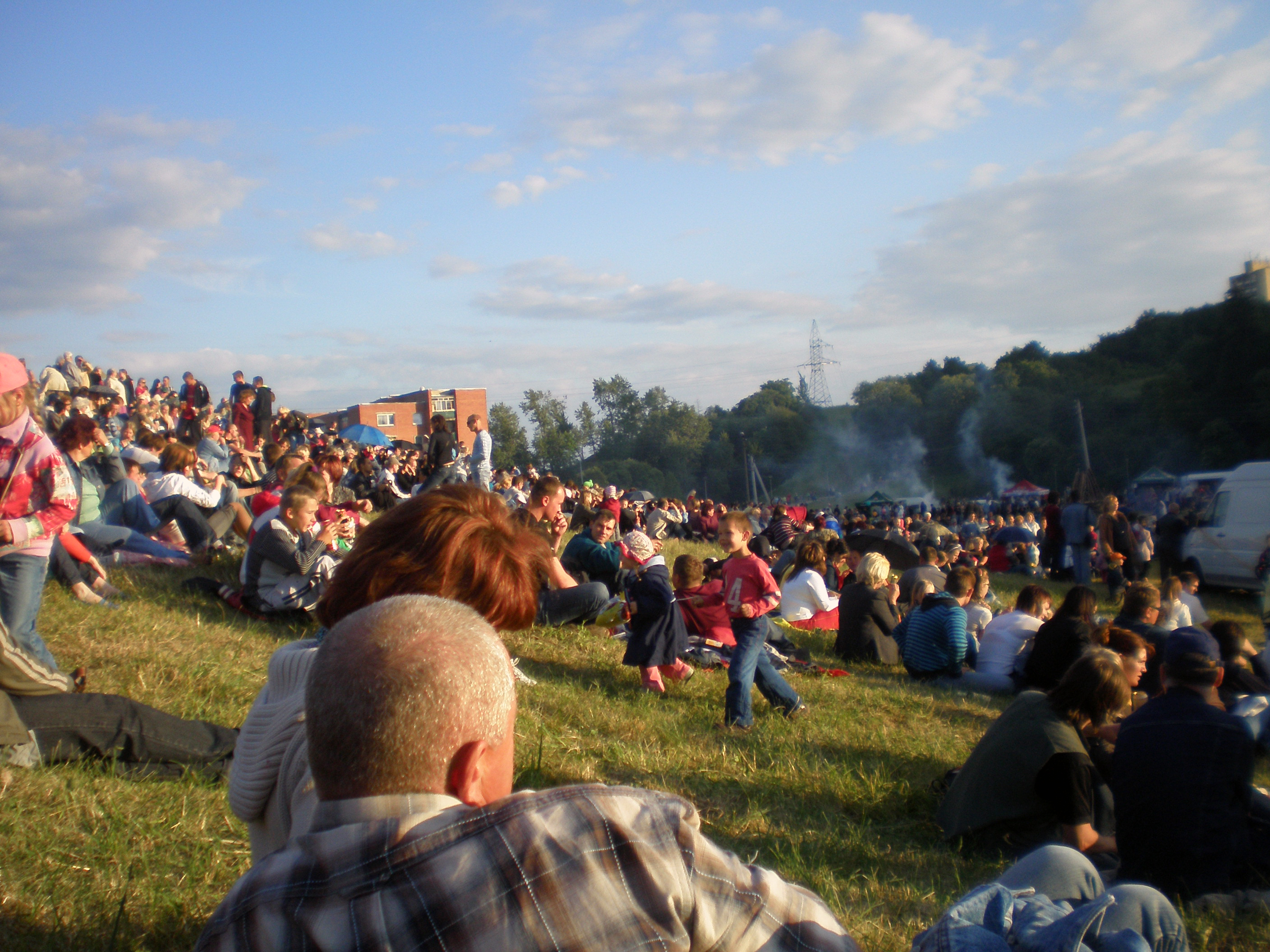
Celebration of Saint Jonas's Festival in Jonava

== See also ==
- Jonava Bridge
- Jonava Market
