= A19 highway (Lithuania) =

Road in Lithuania

A19
- Vilniaus pietinis aplinkkelis

Route information
- Length: 7.9 km (4.9 mi)

Major junctions
- From: Gariūnai, Vilnius
- A 1 Gariūnai Lentvaris; A 4 / A 16 Marijampolė, Druskininkai; Kirtimų gatvė K 106 Paneriai
- To: Paneriai, Vilnius

Location
- Country: Lithuania
- Major cities: Vilnius

Highway system
- Transport in Lithuania

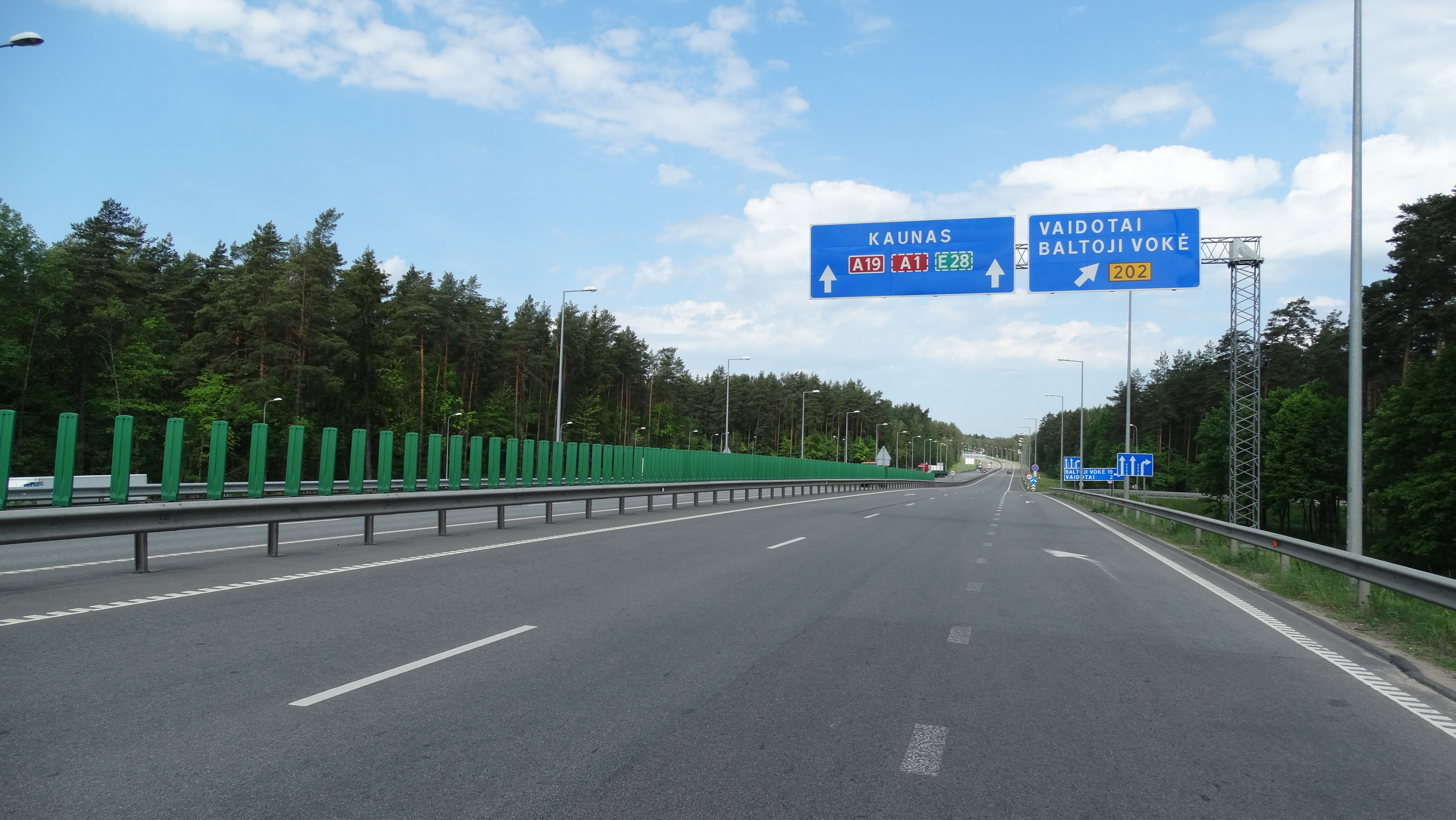
A19 road near junction with roads 106 and 202

The A19 highway is a highway in Lithuania (Magistralinis kelias). Route in its current phase mainly runs through suburb of Aukštieji Paneriai in Vilnius. The length of the road is 7.9 km. The road is incomplete yet. It is planned that, the road will serve as Greater Southern bypass of Vilnius. It will connect roads A15 and A3. The profile of the new planned road will be 1+1.

Road in its current phase has 2+2 profile. It is a result of the widening works of an old narrow 1+1 profile road, that was part of the route 106. Works completed in 2013.
