= A2 highway (Lithuania) =

Highway in Lithuania

A2
- Vilnius-Panevėžys Highway

Route information
- Part of E272
- Length: 135.92 km (84.46 mi)

Major junctions
- From: Vilnius
- A 6 A6 near Ukmergė; A 8 A8 near Panevėžys
- To: Panevėžys

Location
- Country: Lithuania
- Major cities: Vilnius, Širvintos, Ukmergė, Panevėžys

Highway system
- Transport in Lithuania

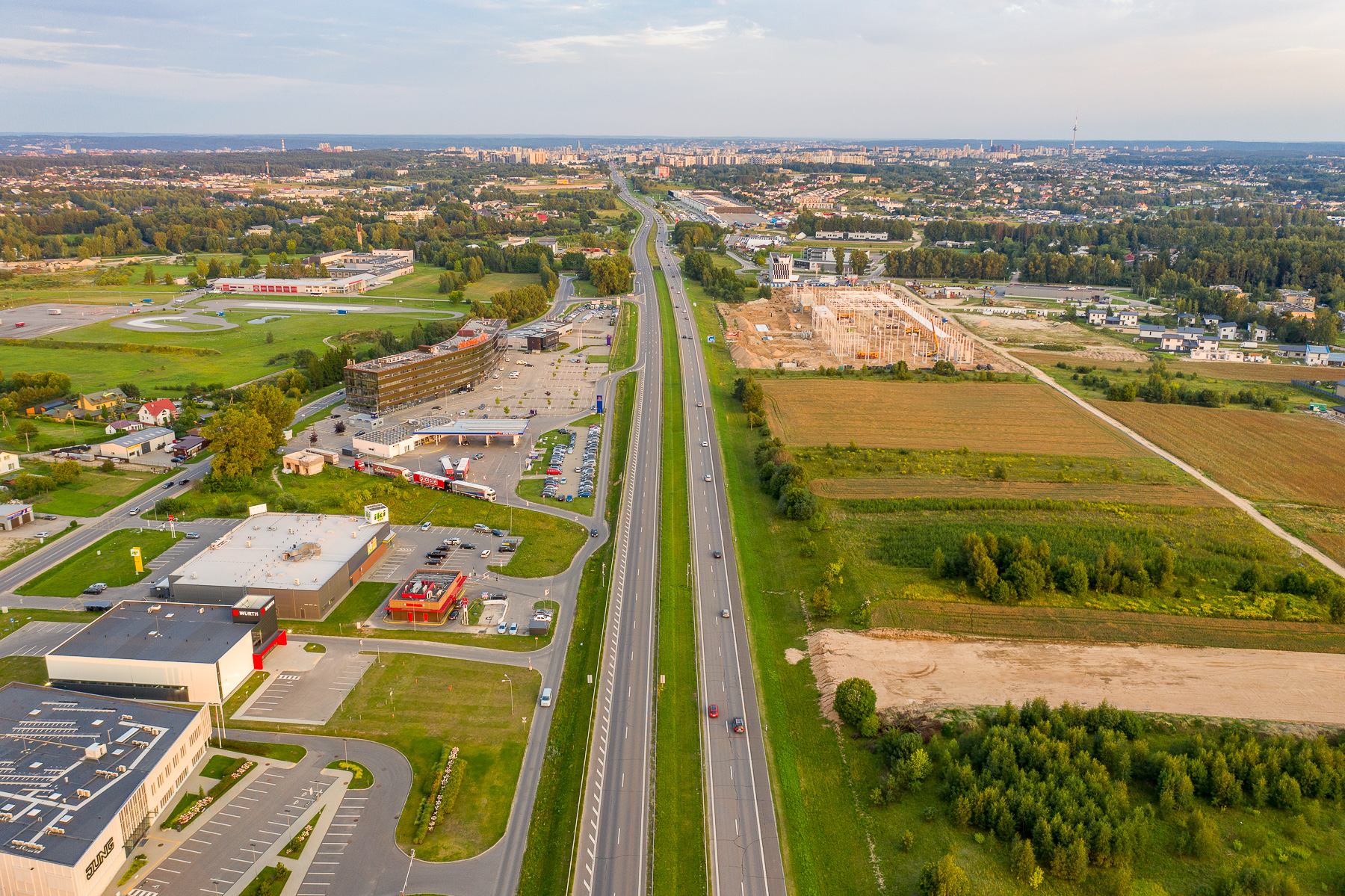
Start of the A2 near Vilnius

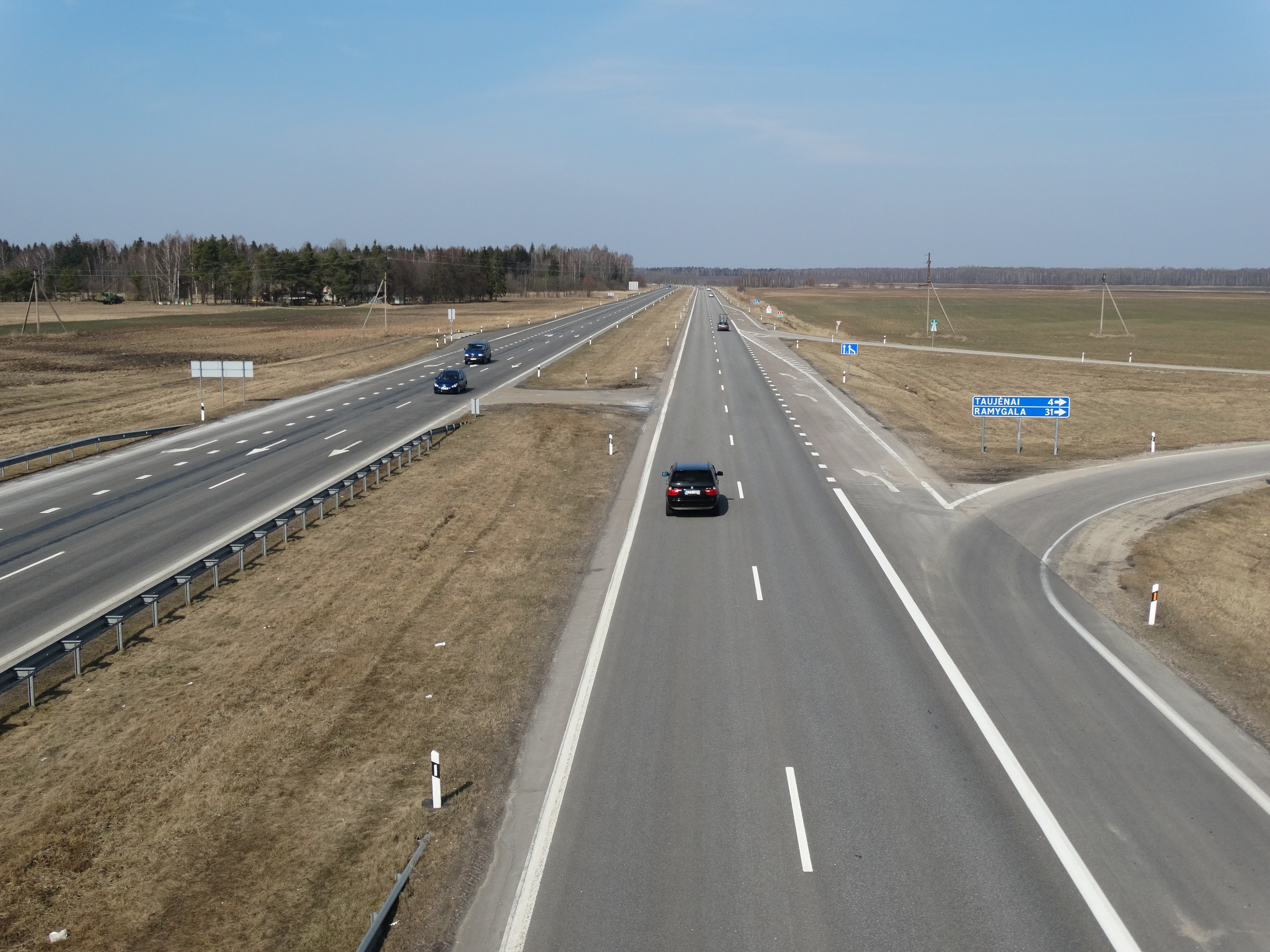
Typical scenery of the road. A2 highway near Taujėnai

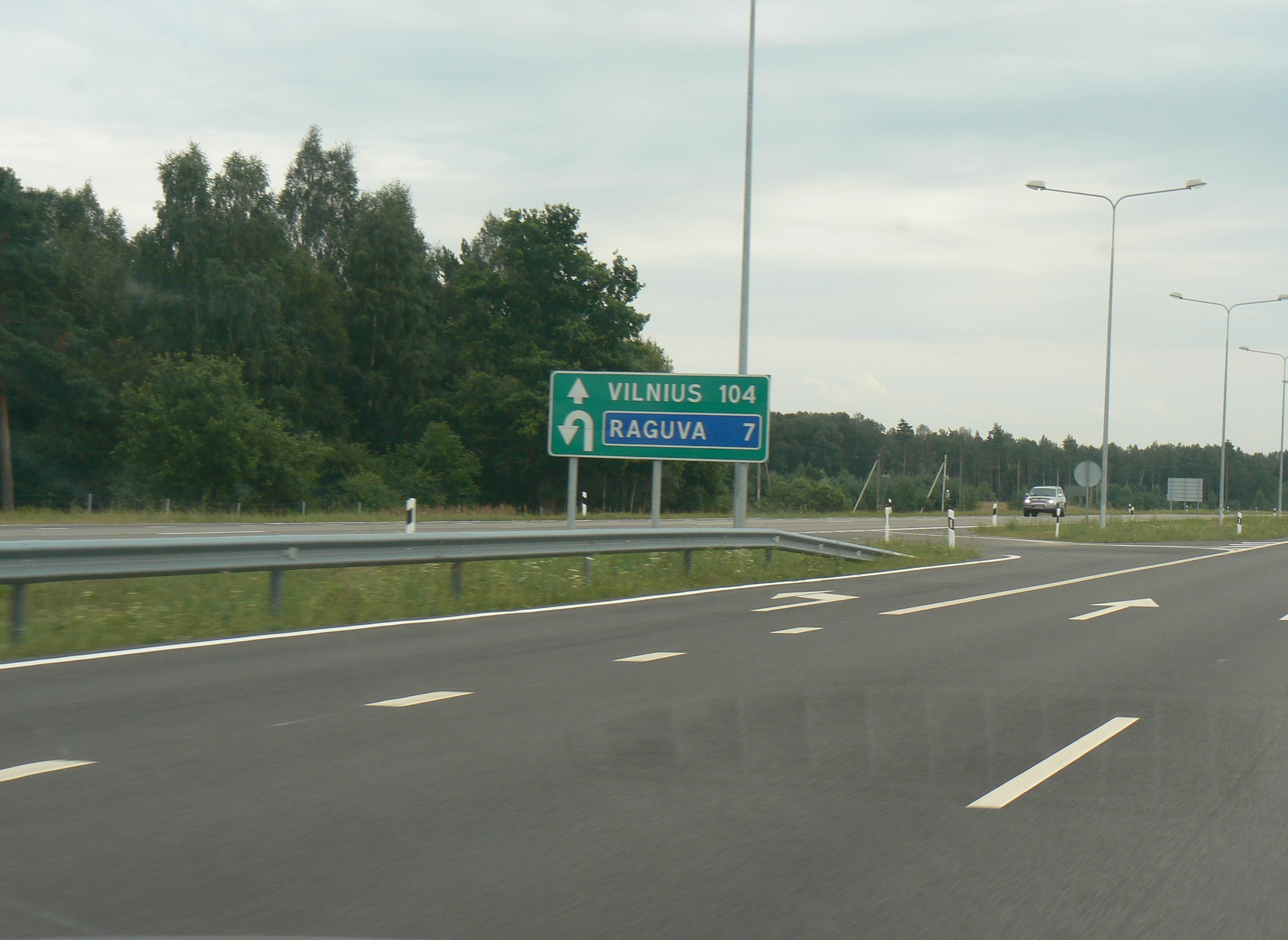
Motorway junction with U-turns. Highway near Raguva

The A2 motorway is a highway in Lithuania (Magistralinis kelias). It connects the capital city of Vilnius with Panevėžys, via Ukmergė.

Its length is over 130 kilometres (81 mi). It is a motorway for almost its whole length. Planning for the highway started in 1969-1970 and the first part, from Vilnius to Ukmergė was opened in 1980, largely following a new route, bypassing the towns and settlements along the way. The highway was extended to Panevėžys, with one side opening in 1990 and the other ultimately completed in 1998.

There are in total six at-grade junctions with U-turns in this motorway. Five out of six of these junctions have automatic detecting systems with variable electronic road signs implemented which indicate a lower speed limit (usually 110 km/h instead of 130 km/h in summer time) if a U-turn or surrounding infrastructure is being used (excluding transit traffic of A2 highway). One section with a U-turn, but without this system has standard signs with the lowered speed limit of 110 km/h. Agricultural vehicles cannot enter either the main road or the U-turns just to get to the other side since motorway signs are implemented near the junctions which restrict entry for any agricultural or slow vehicle.

The A2 highway has 4 lanes (two lanes each way) separated by a wide grass line and, in many parts, safety rails. The highway follows European route E272 for its entire length.

The most notable event in the highway was the peaceful political demonstration of the Baltic Way during the Singing Revolution in the late 1980s. Approximately two million people joined their hands to form a human chain spanning 675.5 kilometres (419.7 mi) across the three Baltic states then being part of USSR. The event was commemorated on the highway in 2019, and the highway was officially named "Baltic Way" by the Lithuanian government in 2020. Before early 1990s, the road was part of the Soviet Union's route signing system and was part of the Minsk-Vilnius-Riga-Tallinn.
