= E262 =

E262 may refer to:

- Sodium acetate – sodium salt of acetic acid;
- European route E262 – road from European road system.
