= A13 highway (Lithuania) =

Road in Lithuania

A13
- Klaipėda-Palanga-Liepoja

Route information
- Part of E272
- Length: 45.15 km (28.05 mi)

Major junctions
- From: Jakai junction near Klaipėda
- To: Būtingė (border with Latvia) A 11

Location
- Country: Lithuania
- Major cities: Klaipėda, Palanga

Highway system
- Transport in Lithuania

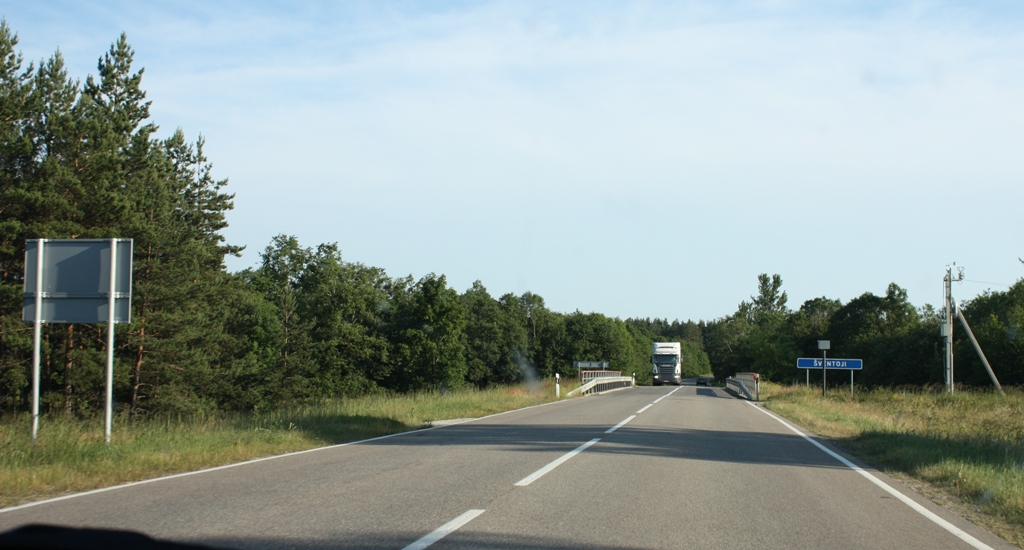
Road section near Šventoji

The A13 highway is a highway in Lithuania (Magistralinis kelias). It connects Klaipėda with the Latvian border near Būtingė. From there, the road continues to Liepāja as the A11. The length of the road is 45.15 km.

The section between Jakai (A1) junction and Palanga (A11) junction is dual-carriageway. The section between the junction with 168 and Palanga is planned to be refurbished to limited-access expressway with a default speed limit of 120 km/h. From A11 junction to the Latvian border, the road continues as a single carriageway.

This route is a part of the International E-road network (part of European route E272).
