= Samogitian highway =

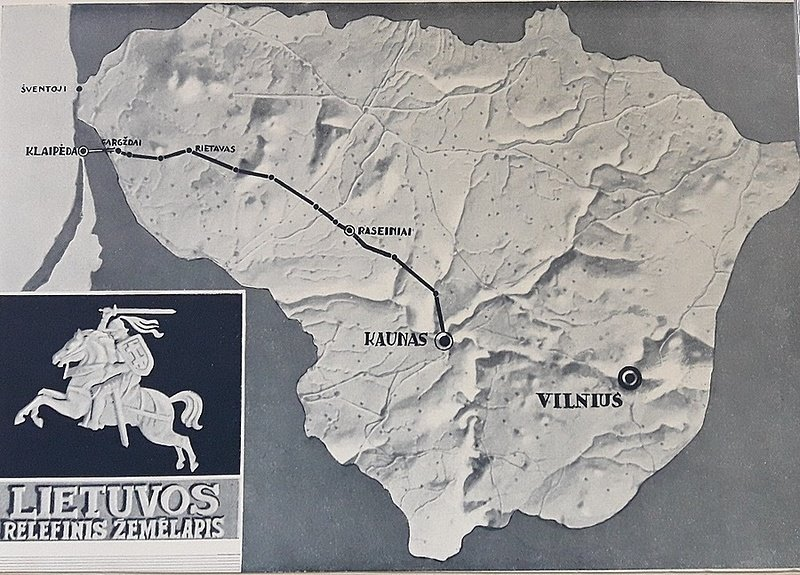
- Route of the Samogitian Highway, 1940

Route information
- Length: 195 km (121 mi)
- Existed: 1939–1987

Major junctions
- From: Kaunas
- To: Klaipėda

Location
- Country: Lithuania
- Major cities: Kaunas, Raseiniai, Rietavas, Gargždai, Klaipėda

Highway system
- Transport in Lithuania

Samogitian highway (Lithuanian: Žemaičių plentas) was a highway that connected Kaunas and Klaipėda. Completed in 1939 and stretching 195 kilometres (121 mi), it was the longest highway constructed in Lithuania since its independence in 1918. It was intended to improve access to Klaipėda, which had become part of Lithuania in 1923. The highway was replaced by the modern Kaunas–Klaipėda highway in 1987.

== History ==
After Lithuania declared independence in 1918, the roads in the country were in poor condition. In addition, they were very unevenly laid out: the highways were arranged mostly north to south, passing through Šiauliai–Tauragė and Zarasai–Kaunas–Marijampolė, but with no connection between them. Samogitia, the northern part of Lithuania, the Klaipėda Region and its port had no connection with Kaunas – the temporary capital of Lithuania at the time. The development of the new highway was seen as a priority, but faced challenges due to lack of funds.

The design for the new road was led by the Land Road Directorate of the Road Board of the Ministry of Transport and Communications, and was carried out by local contractors. The Samogitian highway was constructed with macadam pavement, based on rubble and sand, asphalted, with drainage. Unlike the older roads, it was adapted for motor vehicles: it followed a straighter route, the turns had a larger radius, the carriageway was tilted to the inside of steeper curves. Three large bridges were built: over the Nevėžis, Dubysa and Minija. At the intersection with the Šiauliai–Tauragė highway, the first modern viaduct in Lithuania was built.

The opening ceremony took place on 9 July 1939 at Dievytis Lake, on Šiauduva Hill, attended by the President Antanas Smetona and other guests. The ceremony received broad coverage in local press. By that time, Klaipėda Region was annexed to Nazi Germany and the highway terminated at Gargždai. After the loss of Klaipėda, the Lithuanian government decided to develop the port of Šventoji. In the section between Rietavas and Vėžaičiai, the foundation of the road to Šventoji was started. A voluntary youth work and recreation camp was organized under the auspices of the Ministry of Transport and Communications. On the eve of the Second World War, construction stopped.

With the growth of traffic flows after the war, the Samogitian highway no longer met the transport needs. In 1971, the construction of the modern Kaunas–Klaipėda highway was started, running along a new, straightened route. For about 40 kilometres (25 mi) from Kaunas, the route of the old highway coincides with the newly built highway. After the new highway was completed in 1987, the rest of the old Samogitian highway is used for local traffic between nearby towns and settlements.

== Monument ==
During the construction of the Samogitian highway, it was decided to erect a monument to commemorate this historic event. A site on Milikonys Hill at the start of the highway in Kaunas was selected, which offered a view of the city below. A 7.20-metre (23.6 ft) high obelisk "Horses of Thunder" was designed by sculptor Vytautas Kašuba. It was constructed of light grey angular and round-shaped granite blocks, topped with a composition of two horses' heads and a man holding the horses. The coats of arms of Kaunas and Klaipėda were engraved on the sides, and near the pedestal there is an inscription: "Samogitian highway Kaunas–Klaipėda 220 km 1933–1938". During the Second World War, the obelisk suffered almost no damage.

In 2004, the monument was relocated a little further from the road, in order to make room for an observation deck. During the relocation, a brass capsule placed in a wooden round case was found. The capsule contained 21 coins of different denominations minted between 1925 and 1936, and a deed written on parchment listing the engineers who led the construction of the road. The well-preserved parchment, which had been placed in the glass case in the capsule, is decorated with the coats of arms of Lithuania, Vilnius, and Klaipėda. The observation deck was completed in 2008.
