= A1 highway (Lithuania) =

Highway in Lithuania

A1
- Vilnius-Kaunas-Klaipėda Highway

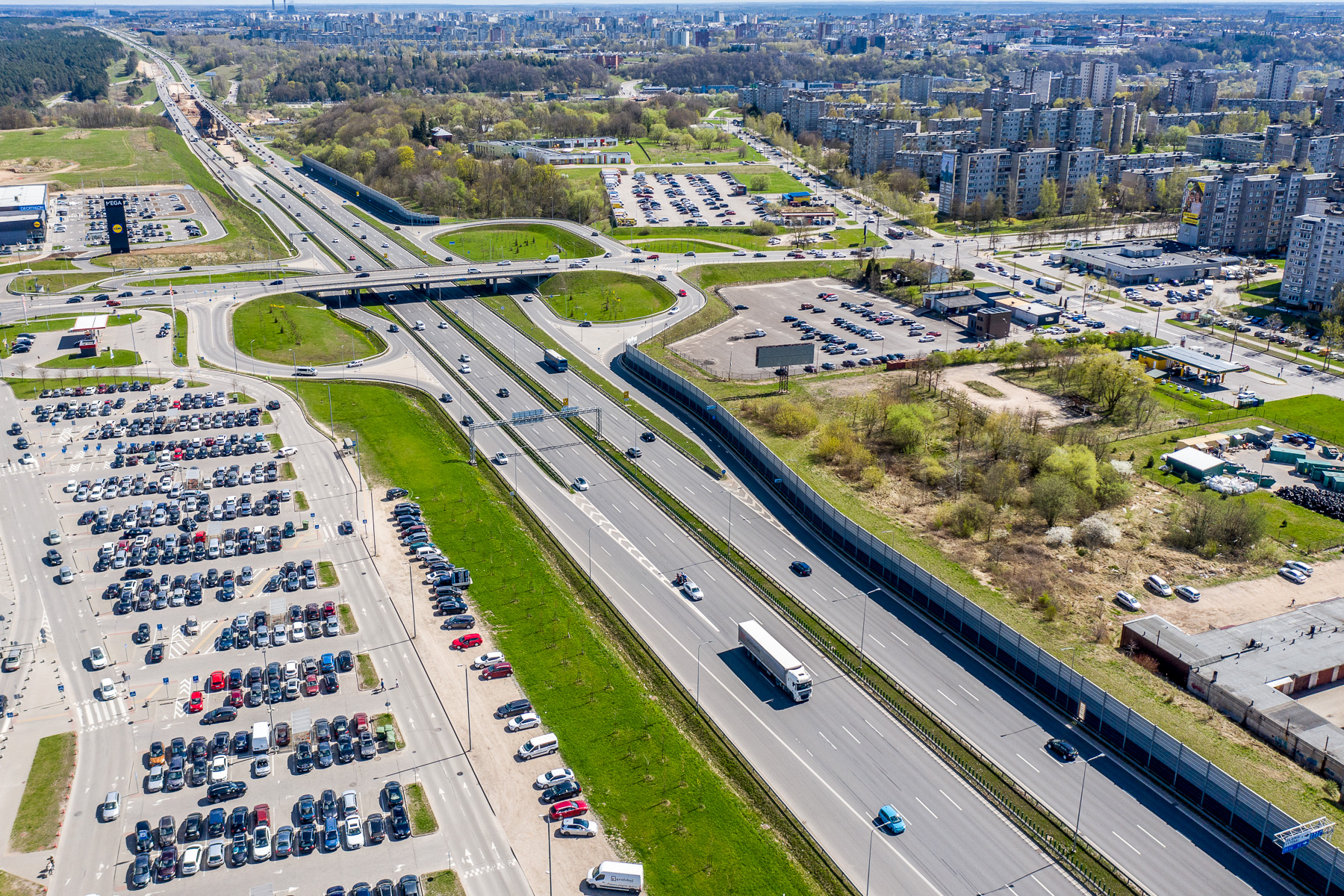

Route information
- Part of E28 E67 E85
- Length: 311.40 km (193.49 mi)
- Existed: 1987–present

Major junctions
- East end: Vilnius
- A 4 A 16 A4 and A16 in Vilnius A 6 A6 in Kaunas; A 5 A5 in Kaunas; A 8 A8 near Sitkūnai; A 12 A12 near Kryžkalnis A 13 A13 near Klaipėda
- West end: Klaipėda

Location
- Country: Lithuania
- Major cities: Grigiškės, Vievis, Elektrėnai, Kaišiadorys, Kaunas, Raseiniai, Klaipėda

Highway system
- Transport in Lithuania

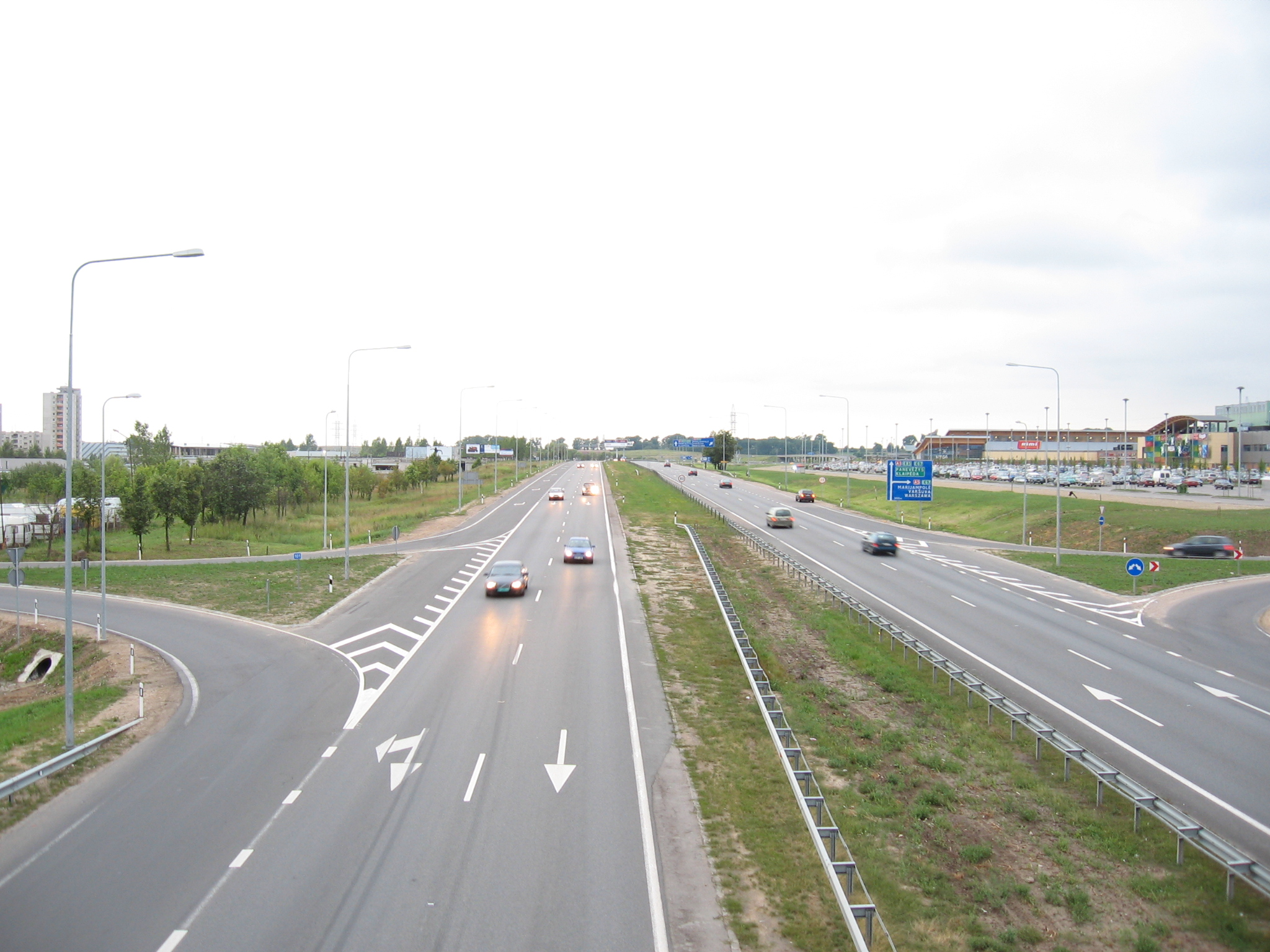
Highway A1 in Kaunas before widening works that were held

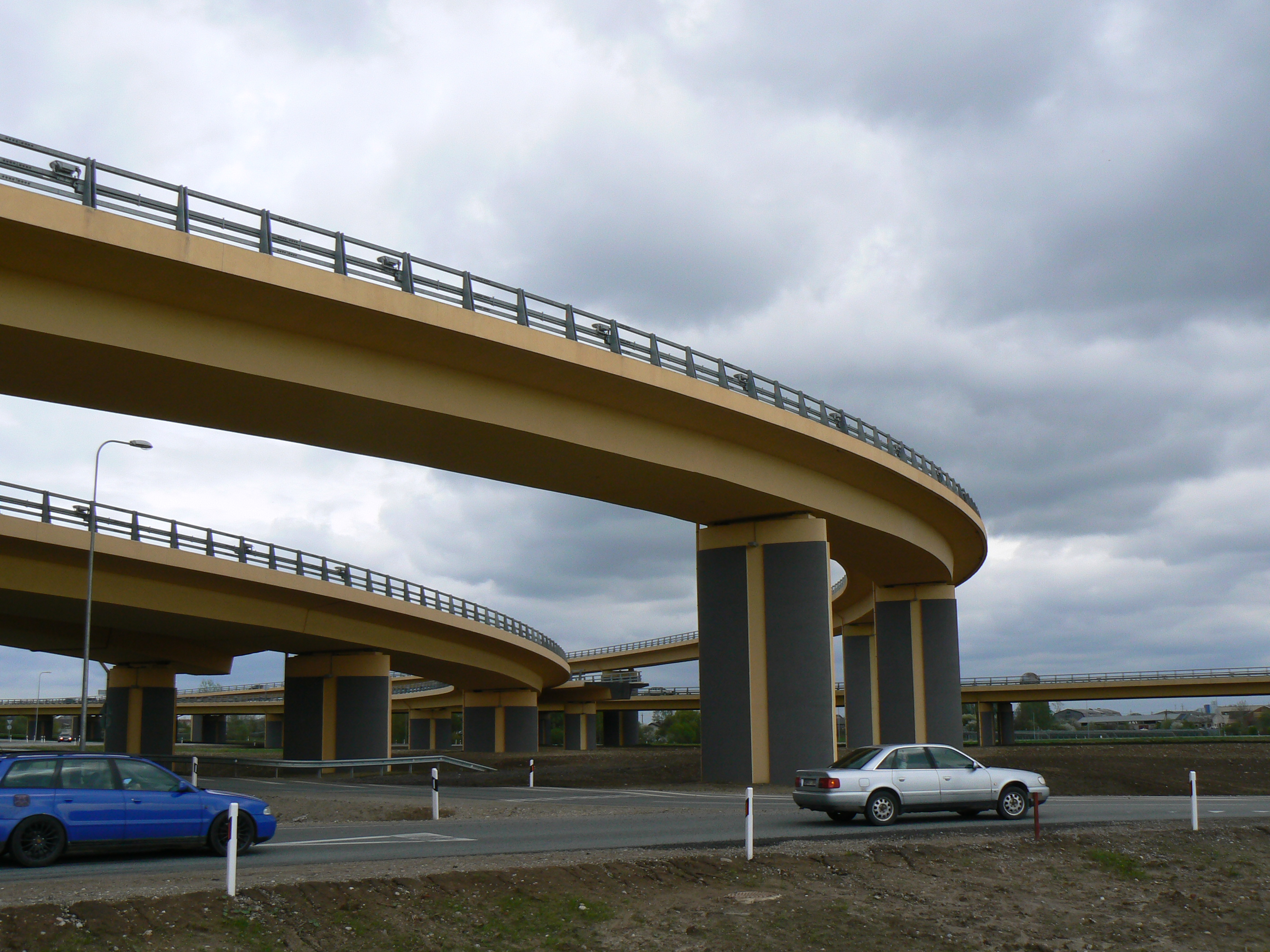
Jakai junction near Klaipėda. A1 is one straight bridge in the distance

The A1 highway is a highway in Lithuania, connecting the three largest cities in the country: Vilnius, Kaunas, and Klaipėda. The highway is 311.4 kilometres (193.5 mi) long, making it the longest highway route in Lithuania.

Highway is indicated as motorway between municipal borders of Vilnius and Klaipėda. This excludes sections that crosses Vievis, Kaunas and Sujainiai (which has one-level junction that is used by agricultural vehicles at times). The highway has two carriageways with two lanes each for the entire section. This excludes section near Kaunas between junctions with A5 and A6 highways. It's now undergoing reconstruction where the road will be widened to have four carriageways with two lanes each with one short section with four lanes which is already refurbished. Two outer carriageways will be used for connecting densely located local junctions with speed limit of 90 km/h, while two inner carriageways will avoid connections with local junctions and the speed limit will be higher with 110 km/h. Inner carriageways will be connected via slip roads from outer carriageways. The main reason why the road is now under construction is that the section has highest AADT in Lithuania of all roads outside urban areas.

Before 2021, only section Kaunas-Klaipėda was considered to be a motorway while section Kaunas-Vilnius was considered to be an expressway from 2006. Kaunas-Vilnius had too many substandard features for receiving motorway status. Reconstruction took place in 2020 on which many minor elements of the highway were renovated to fulfil the standards for safe 130 km/h traffic. This includes reconstruction of lanes near junctions, reducing amount of some slipways, removing possibility of pedestrian crossing at grade, building pedestrian underpasses and overpasses. New motorway will remain not completely grade separated since there are some points where the highway can be accessed via right ins and outs whom doesn't form parts of grade-separated junctions. This is not usual for motorway in Europe, since most motorways here are accessed via grade separated junction.

The highway follows E85 for its entire length with the relatively short section of E67 northwest of Kaunas also known as the Via Baltica.

The Vilnius–Kaunas highway was completed on 3 November 1970 and Kaunas–Klaipėda was completed on 1 September 1987. It replaced the first 40 kilometers of the 1930s-built Samogitian Highway stretching from Kaunas.

== History ==
=== Sitkūnai Viaduct Reconstruction ===
Located at kilometre 113.6 of the A1 motorway (Vilnius–Kaunas–Klaipėda), the Sitkūnai Viaduct (Sitkūnų viadukas) serves as a vital dual-level interchange intersecting the core national transport artery. Originally constructed over 50 years ago, the aging reinforced concrete structure had degraded significantly. A 2023 technical evaluation assigned the viaduct a critical structural condition rating of 2.1 out of 5, identifying a near-emergency state caused by severely deflected box girder systems, cracked asphalt coatings, and obsolete surface water drainage systems.

To eliminate long-term safety hazards, national road administration Via Lietuva commissioned a total €2.9 million demolition and reconstruction campaign executed by the construction enterprise UAB Autokausta.

==== Phase 1: Structural Demolition and Temporary Bypass (February 2026) ====
Because the section handles an average density exceeding 45,000 vehicles per day, structural engineers rejected complete long-distance regional detours. In early February 2026, the construction zone was integrated with a specialized parallel asphalt bypass loop running between kilometres 112.98 and 114.21.

Overnight from February 21 to February 22, 2026, the main arterial lanes of the A1 were entirely closed to accommodate heavy demolition machinery. During this 10-hour framework, all intercity traffic was routed onto the single temporary bypass road under strict speed restrictions:

- Speed Management: Transit velocities approaching the demolition sector were dropped from the standard 110 km/h limit to 70 km/h, further bottlenecking to 50 km/h directly through the central detour loop.
- Post-Demolition Traffic Flow: Following the removal of the old deck structure, the main A1 lanes were reopened under compressed widths while the 50–70 km/h speed restrictions remained active for the duration of the build.

==== Phase 2: Girder Installation and Target Completion (June 2026) ====
Between June 22 and June 25, 2026, the project reached a critical engineering milestone with the progressive mounting of the new superstructure's precast concrete span girders. Organized in strict phases to minimize transit disruptions, the operation utilized directional overnight closures and single-carriageway cross-overs:

- June 22–23: The Klaipėda–Kaunas carriage block was closed, with all maritime-bound and inbound traffic organized in a shared 1+1 schema on the opposing lanes.
- June 25: The Kaunas–Klaipėda carriage tracks were closed to allow cranes to install the third-span beams over the highway.

The complete modern structural layout—featuring an expanded length of 91 metres (299 ft), dual 3.5-metre (11 ft) travel lanes, enhanced safety margins, and a 2.3-metre (7.5 ft) dedicated pedestrian path—is designated to achieve full operational status by the end of December 2026.

=== Ašigalio Street Interchange ===
The Ašigalio Street Interchange (Ašigalio gatvės transporto mazgas) is a strategic multi-level junction located on the Islandijos plentas section of the A1 motorway in northern Kaunas. Positioned between the Eiguliai and Kalniečiai microdistricts, the project was developed via an infrastructure partnership between the Kaunas City Municipality and national road administration Via Lietuva. The completed grade-separated overpass officially opened to public traffic in June 2026.

Designed to resolve severe bottlenecks at the northern entry points of the city, the infrastructure introduced a dedicated overpass spanning the high-speed A1 transit corridor, supported by newly integrated acceleration and deceleration lanes. The completion of the interchange introduced several structural modifications to regional traffic patterns:

- Traffic Decentralization: The interchange establishes an alternative connection for inbound vehicles arriving from the direction of Vilnius, enabling them to bypass saturated arterial routes and filter directly into northern municipal zones.
- Congestion Alleviation: By distributing local commuter flows, the project successfully reduced traffic volumes at the heavily gridlocked Savanorių Avenue and A1 intersection (the Murava junction), significantly lowering travel delays during morning and evening peak hours.
- Outbound Logistics: In addition to urban distribution, the newly built ramps provide safe, high-speed acceleration lanes for outbound city traffic merging onto the A1 westward toward Klaipėda and the Baltic coast.
- Pedestrian Infrastructure: The project reconnected localized spaces previously severed by the motorway corridor, incorporating grade-separated pedestrian sidewalks and cycling pathways to link peripheral residential quarters with urban transport hubs.

The opening in mid-2026 marked a key developmental phase in Via Lietuva's master plan to systematically separate domestic municipal traffic from international freight transit along the E67 and A1 European transport networks.

=== Gariūnai Interchange Viaduct Reconstruction ===
Located at kilometre 12.3 of the A1 motorway near the western gateway of Vilnius, the Gariūnai Viaduct (Gariūnų viadukas) spans across the Kirtimų Street alignment (the Vilnius Southern Bypass corridor). Erected in 1981, the original structure carried over 44,000 vehicles per day, including more than 4,600 heavy goods vehicles (HGVs). Due to decades of severe structural loading, the viaduct suffered extensive degradation, culminating in a critical condition rating that required immediate intervention to protect the international E28 transport corridor.

In March 2026, national road administrator Via Lietuva launched a comprehensive €6.5 million complete demolition and reconstruction initiative, with the contract awarded to the specialized engineering contractor UAB Tilsta.

To minimize gridlock on one of Lithuania's highest-volume transport arteries, the infrastructure campaign was structurally divided into two primary construction phases utilizing strategic contraflow and overnight lane restrictions:

- Phase 1 (March – September 2026): Physical works commenced on March 23, 2026. Controlled overnight bridge demolition blocks were conducted between April 3 and April 5, 2026, restricting A1 traffic down to single lanes while completely shutting Kirtimų Street underneath. Following clearing operations, all dual-directional vehicle flows were funneled entirely onto the northern (right-hand) side of the structure. This phase focuses on the complete rebuilding of the southern (Vilnius-bound) deck and is slated for structural completion by September 15, 2026.
- Phase 2 (September 2026 – Summer 2027): Upon completion of the southern segment, vehicular traffic will be reassigned to the newly laid deck. Engineering crews will subsequently begin the complete demolition and replacement of the remaining northern (Kaunas-bound) section.

The engineering footprint of the replacement bridge preserves the original configuration of two functional traffic lanes in each direction. However, the updated 2027 layout incorporates modern high-durability load spans engineered to adhere to current structural safety protocols and international military mobility requirements. The entire interchange corridor is projected to achieve full operational status by the summer of 2027.

== Junctions and infrastructure ==
=== Jakai Viaduct (Jakai Ring) ===
The Jakai Viaduct (Jakų viadukas) is located at the critical junction of the A1 motorway, A13 highway, and A141 road outside Klaipėda. Measuring 610 metres (2,000 ft) in length, it is officially recognized as the longest viaduct in Lithuania. Built to alleviate severe bottlenecks at the historical Jakai Ring (Jakų žiedas), the multi-level flyover system routes continuous, high-speed transit traffic over the intersection. Despite the construction of the overhead viaduct paths, the ground-level Jakai Ring itself remains configured as a standard, high-capacity traditional roundabout to distribute local and regional movements.

=== Banginis Viaduct and Ring ===
Further inbound toward the Klaipėda urban boundary sits the Banginis Ring (Banginio žiedas), named after the adjacent shopping center complex. As part of an urban modernization scheme, the intersection was completely overhauled from a standard, high-friction roundabout into a specialized 1/1/1 multi-lane turbo roundabout.

The structural reconstruction introduced several key design parameters to improve traffic flow and urban integration:

- Filter Lane: A dedicated, physically separated right-turn slip/filter lane was constructed to route vehicles seamlessly from Šilutės Plentas directly onto the A1 access lanes, facilitating continuous flow toward Palanga, Šilutė, and Kaunas without entering the central roundabout matrix.
- Urban Integration: The design repurposed the internal and surrounding structural margins of the junction to incorporate a designated green square and public park zone, blending heavy infrastructure with pedestrian-accessible landscaping.

== See also ==
- Transport in Lithuania
