= Speed limits in Lithuania =

Speed limit traffic sign for Lithuania

As per Lithuanian traffic act §15, the general maximum speed limits in Lithuania are:

- 20 km/h in residential areas, yards and car parks.
- 50 km/h in urban areas / built-up areas.
- 70 km/h on non-urban areas with unpaved (e.g. gravel or dirt) or cobblestone roads.
- 90 km/h on non-urban areas asphalt or concrete roads.
- 110 km/h on both motorway and expressway during period between 1 November and 31 March.
- 120 km/h on expressway (Lithuanian: greitkelis) during period between 1 April and 31 October.
- 130 km/h on motorway (Lithuanian: automagistralė) during period between 1 April and 31 October.

The limits shown above apply unless otherwise stated, as road signs may prescribe a lower or a higher speed limit (e.g. electronic variable signs during lower speed period on motorways showing higher speed limit if driving conditions are satisfactory).

New drivers, anyone with two or less years of driving experience, and learner drivers have to adhere to reduce maximum speed limits. 90 km/h on motorways and highways and 70 km/h on other roads.

Different limits apply to cars towing trailers, trucks and buses.

== See also ==
- Transport in Lithuania
