= European route E272 =

Road in trans-European E-road network

E272

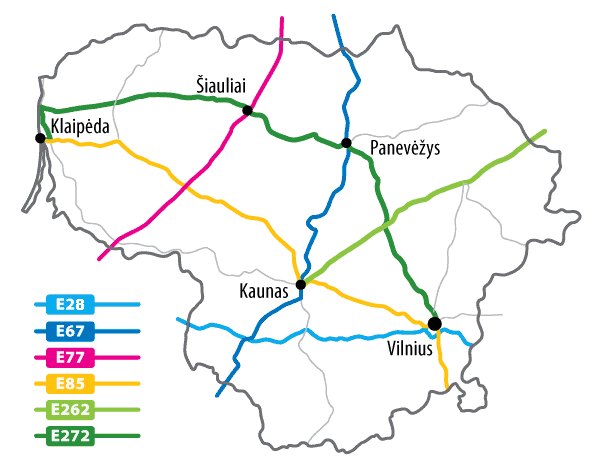

Major junctions
- From: Klaipėda
- To: Vilnius

Location
- Countries: Lithuania
- Major cities: Klaipėda; Palanga; Šiauliai; Panevėžys; Ukmergė; Vilnius

Highway system
- International E-road network; A Class; B Class

European route E272 is a Class B road part of the International E-road network. It runs only through Lithuania, begins in Klaipėda and ends in Vilnius.

Route: Klaipėda–Palanga–Šiauliai–Panevėžys–Ukmergė–Vilnius.

From Klaipėda to Palanga it follows the route of Lithuanian highway A13, A11 from Palanga to Šiauliai, A9 from Šiauliai to Panevėžys, A17 just outside Panevėžys and A2 from Panevėžys to Vilnius.
