= A14 highway (Lithuania) =

Road in Lithuania

A14
- Vilnius-Utena

Route information
- Length: 95.60 km (59.40 mi)

Major junctions
- From: Vilnius
- To: Utena

Location
- Country: Lithuania
- Major cities: Molėtai

Highway system
- Transport in Lithuania

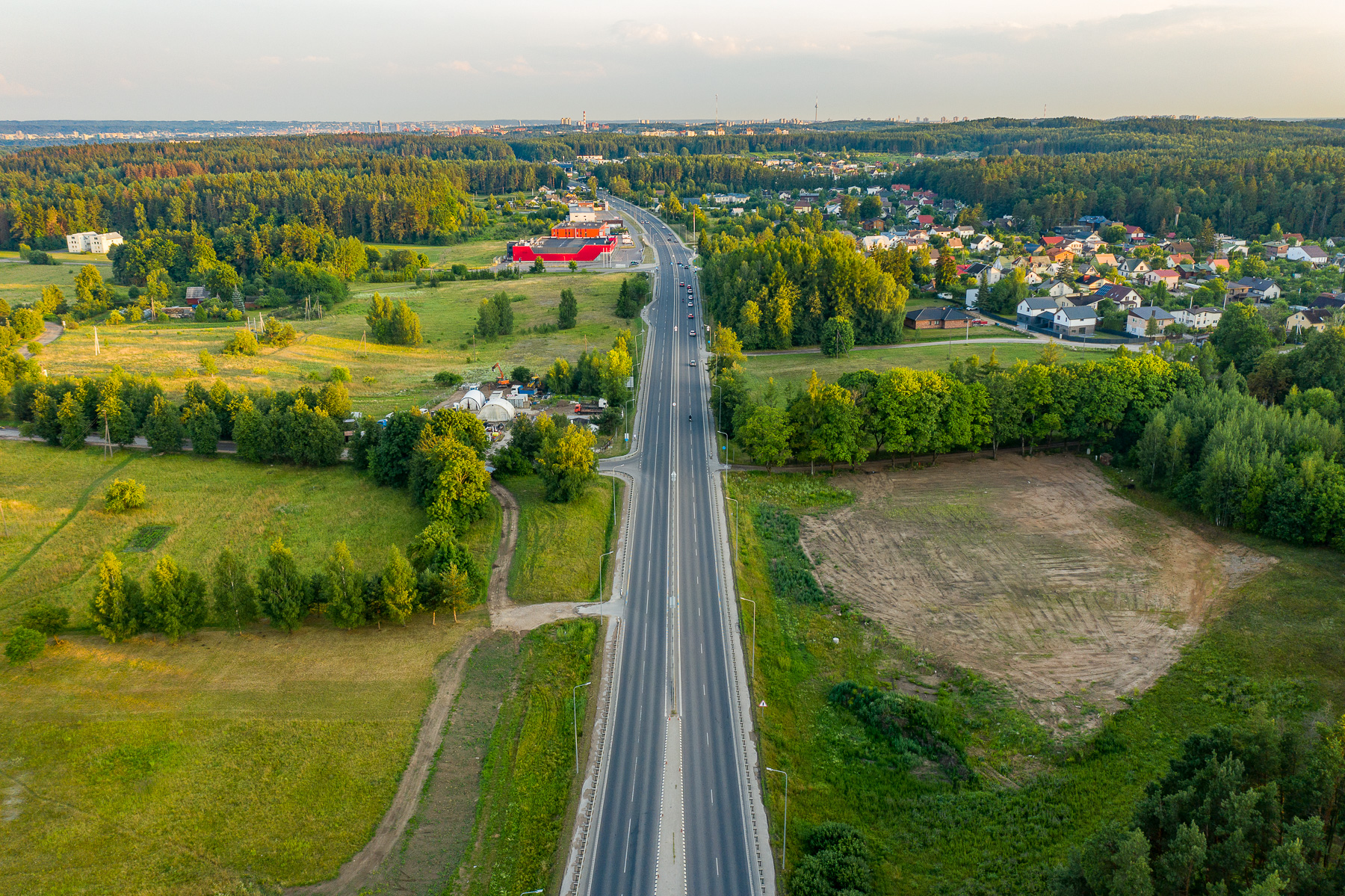

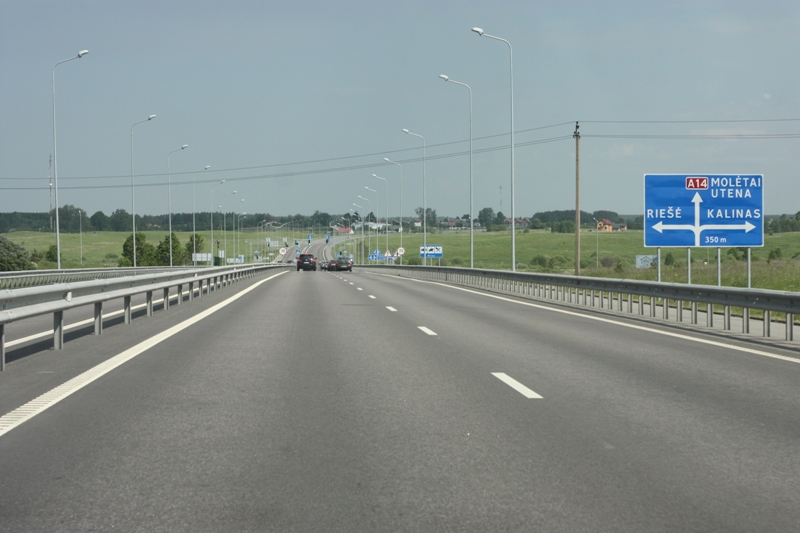
Dual-carriageway section off limits of Vilnius

The A14 highway is a highway in Lithuania (Magistralinis kelias). It connects Vilnius and Utena. The length of the road is 95.60 km.

A 6 km section north of Vilnius city limits is refurbished to 2+2 with at-grade junctions and traffic lights. Another 5 km section with turbo roundabouts up to junction with 108 road is planned to be refurbished in 2018 at the latest.
