= A16 highway (Lithuania) =

Road in Lithuania

A16
- Vilnius-Marijampolė

Route information
- Part of E28
- Length: 137.51 km (85.44 mi)

Major junctions
- From: Vilnius
- To: Marijampolė

Location
- Country: Lithuania
- Major cities: Birštonas, Prienai

Highway system
- Transport in Lithuania

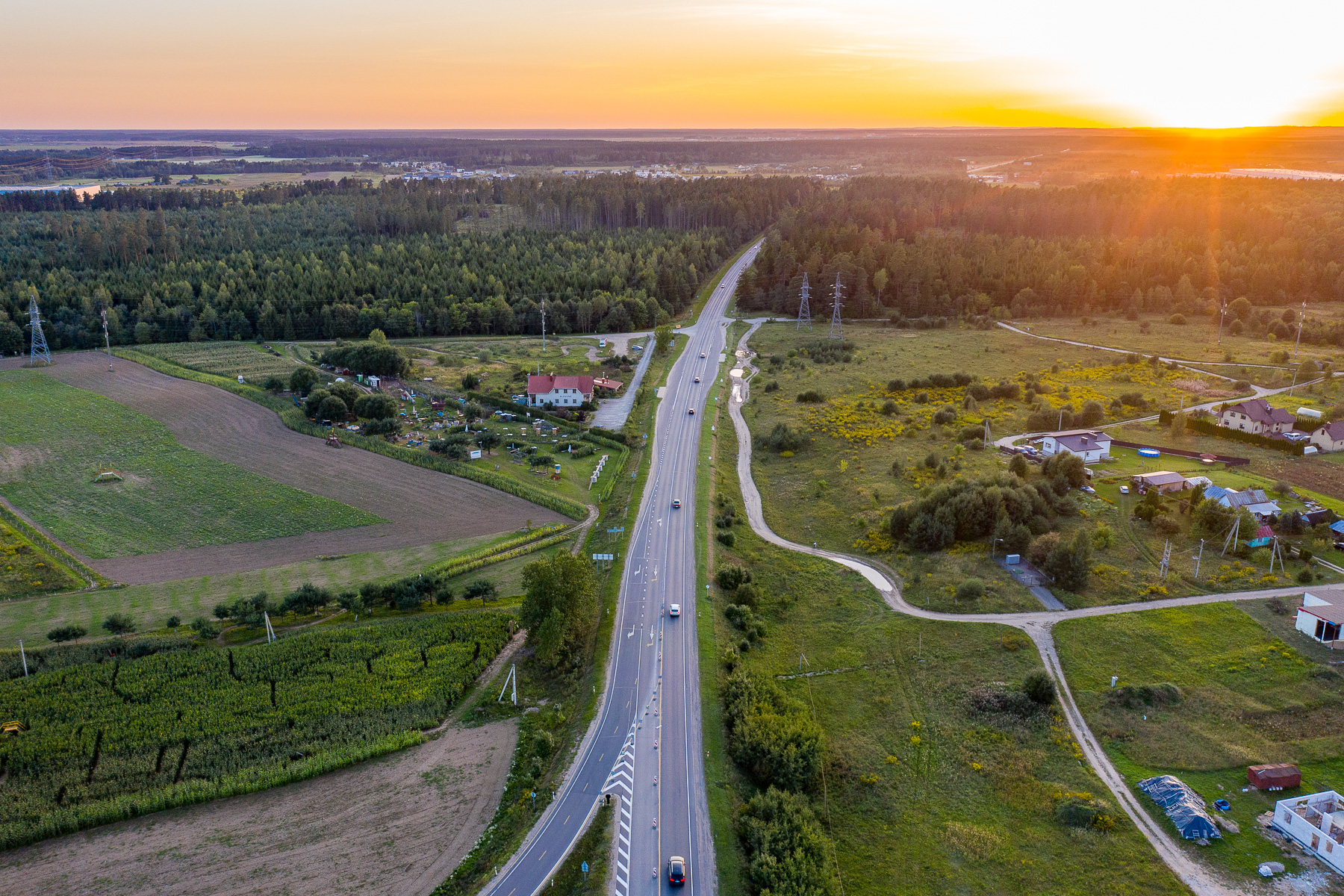
Aerial view of the highway strip

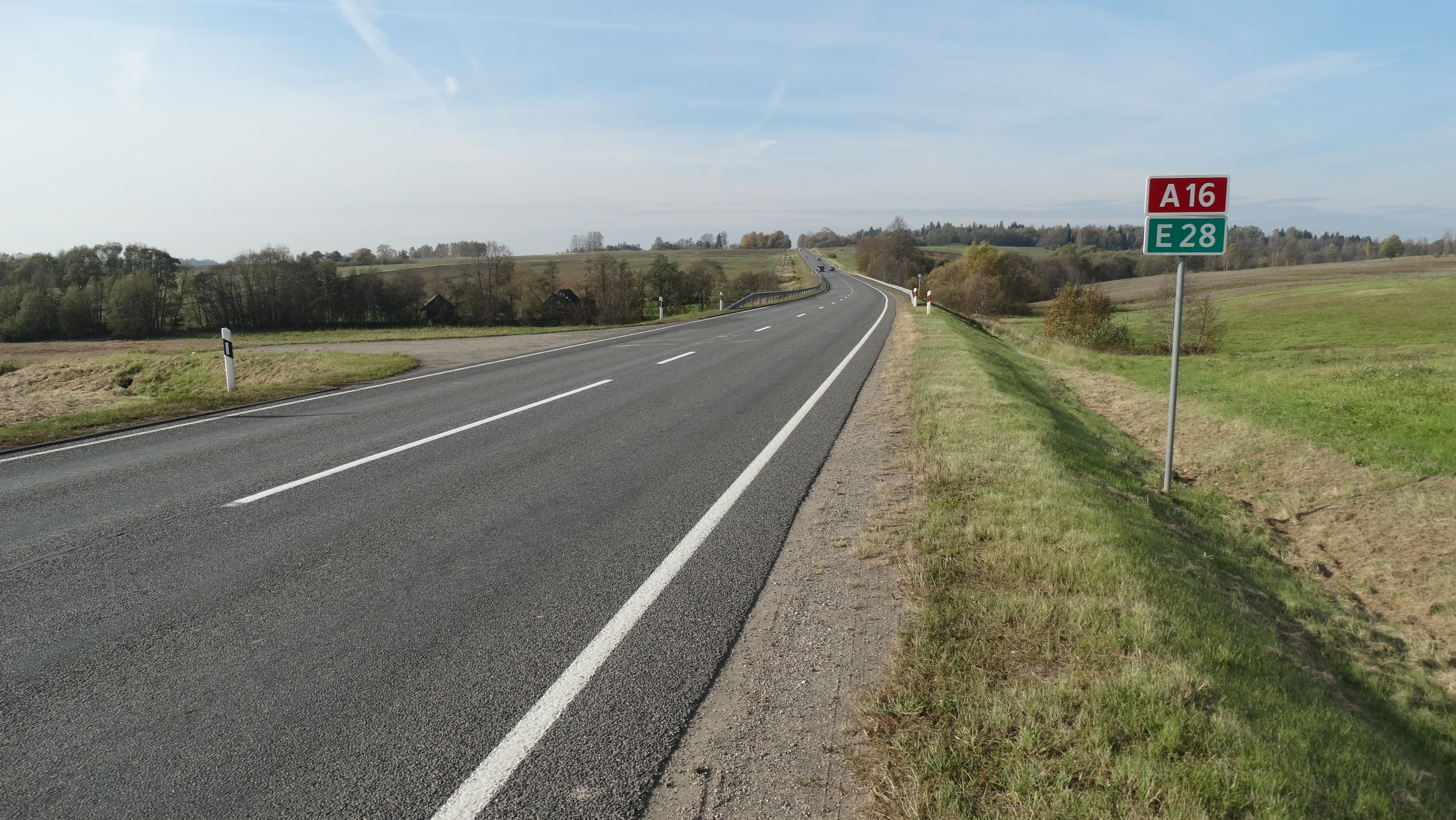
Highway in the vicinity of Jieznas

The A16 highway is a highway in Lithuania (Magistralinis kelias). It connects Vilnius, Prienai and Marijampolė. The length of the road is 137.51 km.

The road is part of European route E28.

Section between junction with Savanorių prospektas (part of A1 highway) in Vilnius and Trakai is planned to be refurbished to dual carriageway. Section between A4 junction and Trakai is planned to be controlled-access.

Short section between Birštonas and Prienai is converted to dual carriageway. Turbo roundabout was implemented near Birštonas.
