= A9 highway (Lithuania) =

Road in Lithuania

A9
- Šiauliai-Radviliškis-Panevėžys Highway

Route information
- Part of E28
- Length: 78.94 km (49.05 mi)

Major junctions
- From: Panevėžys
- To: Šiauliai

Location
- Country: Lithuania
- Major cities: Radviliškis, Šeduva

Highway system
- Transport in Lithuania

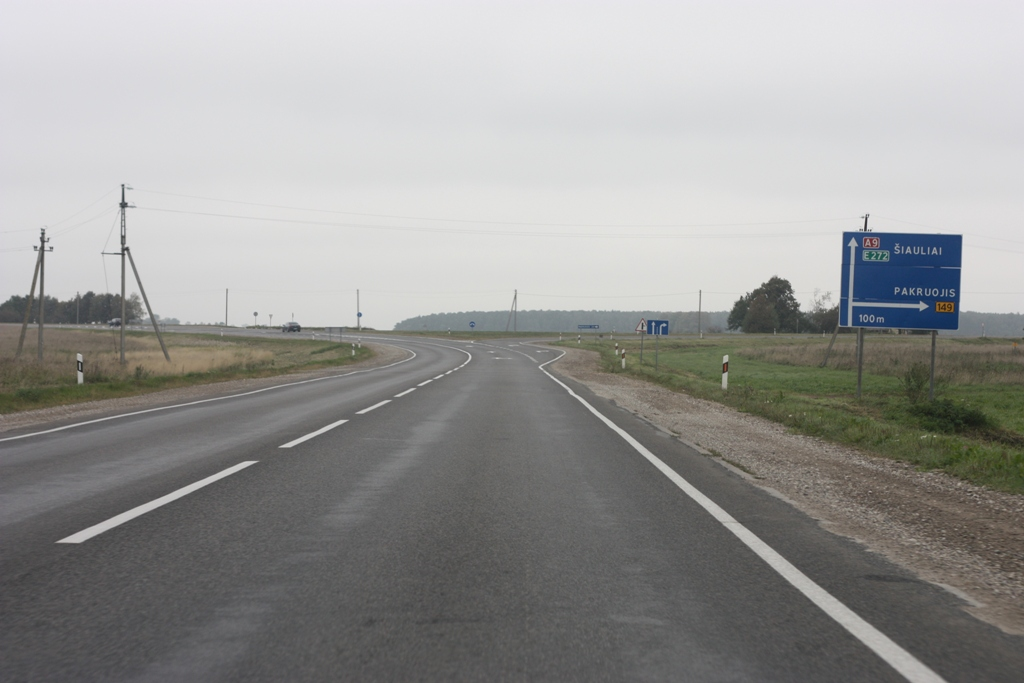
Highway near Smilgiai

The A9 highway is a highway in Lithuania (Magistraliniai keliai). It runs from Panevėžys, through Radviliškis to Šiauliai. The length of the road is 78.94 kilometres. The speed limit for most of the road's length is 90 km/h. This route is a part of International E-road network (part of European route E272).

The major reconstruction of the A9 section—which converted the Radviliškis–Šiauliai highway into a modern 4-lane expressway and built the Kairiai Bypass—took place in the early 2010s:

• Construction Start: Phase II construction, which specifically built the new bypass to route traffic around the town of Kairiai, officially began in the summer of 2011.

• Completion: The completed bypass project was finished, opened to traffic, and subsequently won Lithuania's "Product of the Year" gold medal for infrastructure in 2014.

The stretch of the road between Radviliškis and Šiauliai is modern expressway, with limited access and a 120 km/h speed limit. There are also distant plans to build an expressway to Šeduva, bypassing Radviliškis.
