= European route E67 =

Road in trans-European E-road network

E67

Route information
- Length: 1,722 km (1,070 mi)

Major junctions
- South end: Prague, Czech Republic
- North end: Helsinki, Finland

Location
- Countries: Czech Republic; Poland; Lithuania; Latvia; Estonia; Finland

Highway system
- International E-road network; A Class; B Class

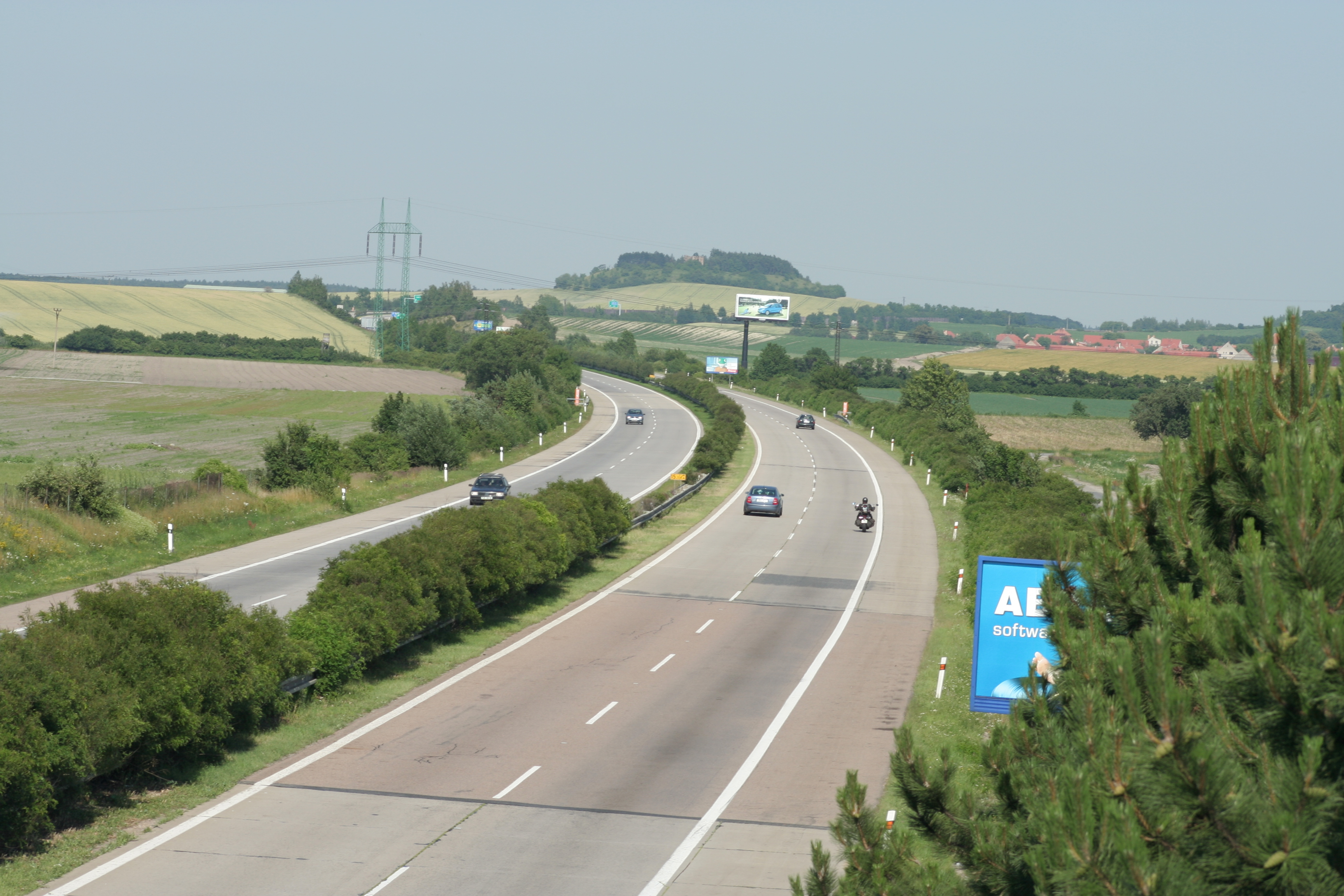
The E67 near Bříství, Czech Republic

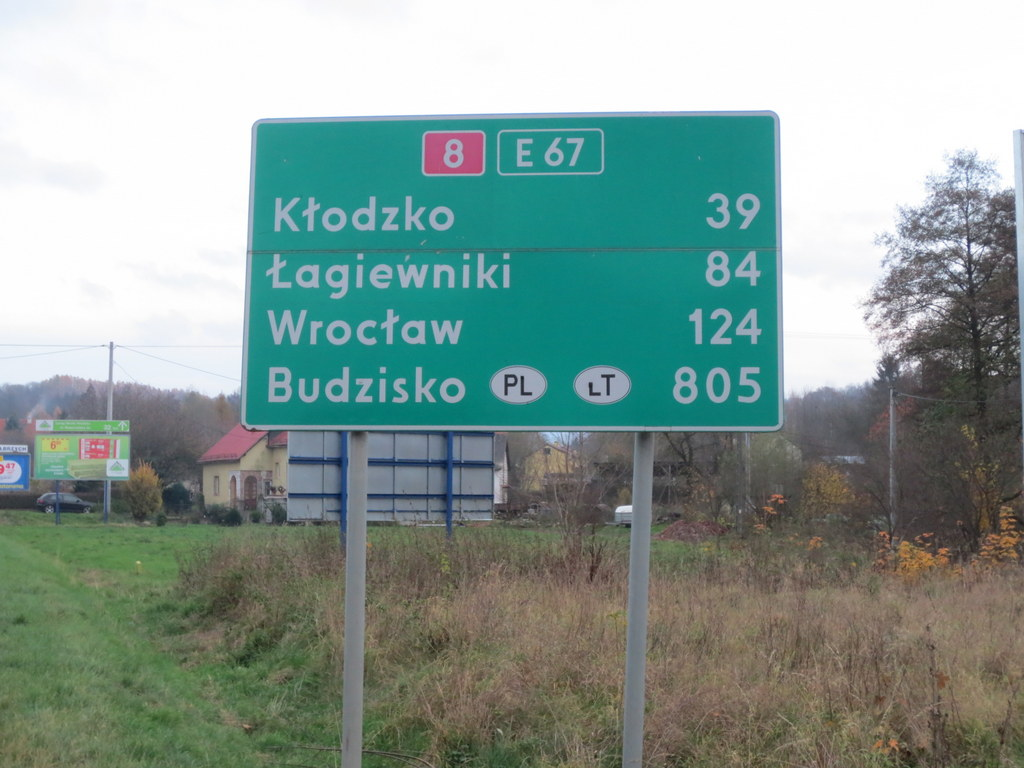
Distance sign behind the Czech border in Poland

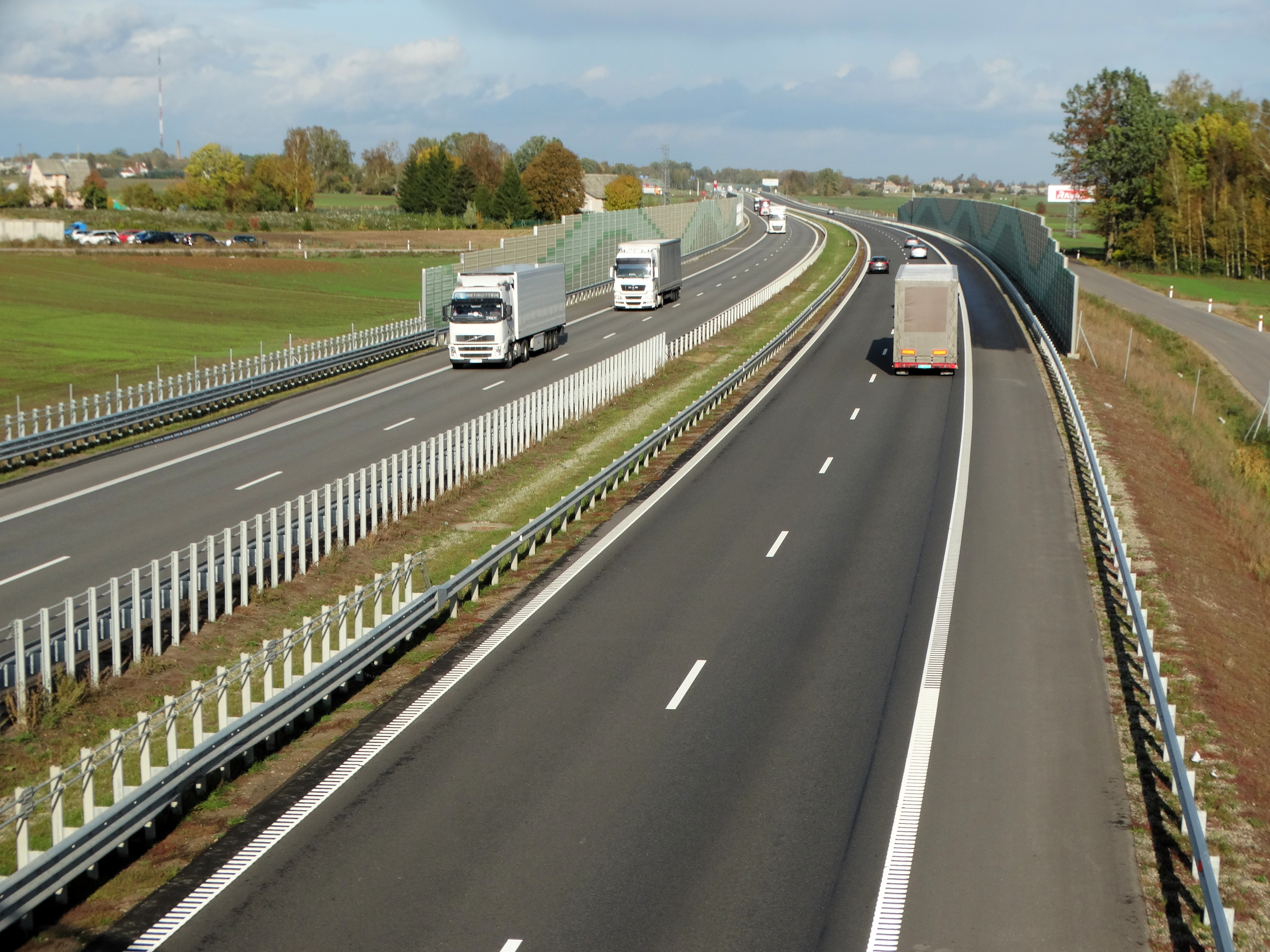
E67 near Veiveriai, Lithuania

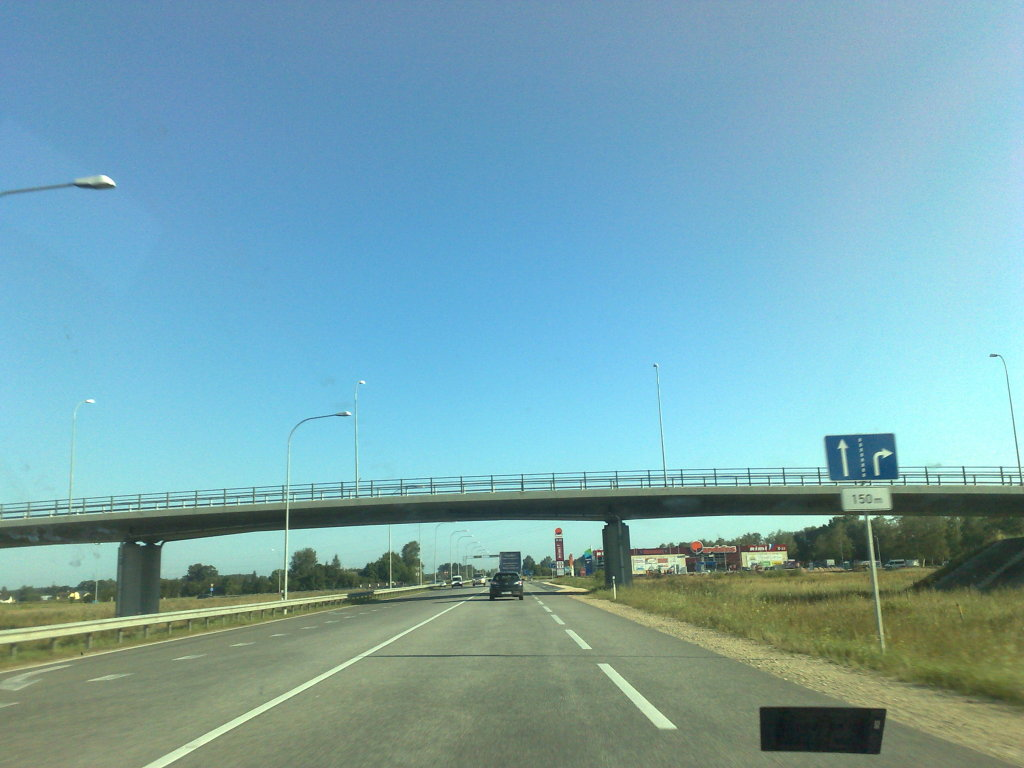
E67 near Ādaži, Latvia

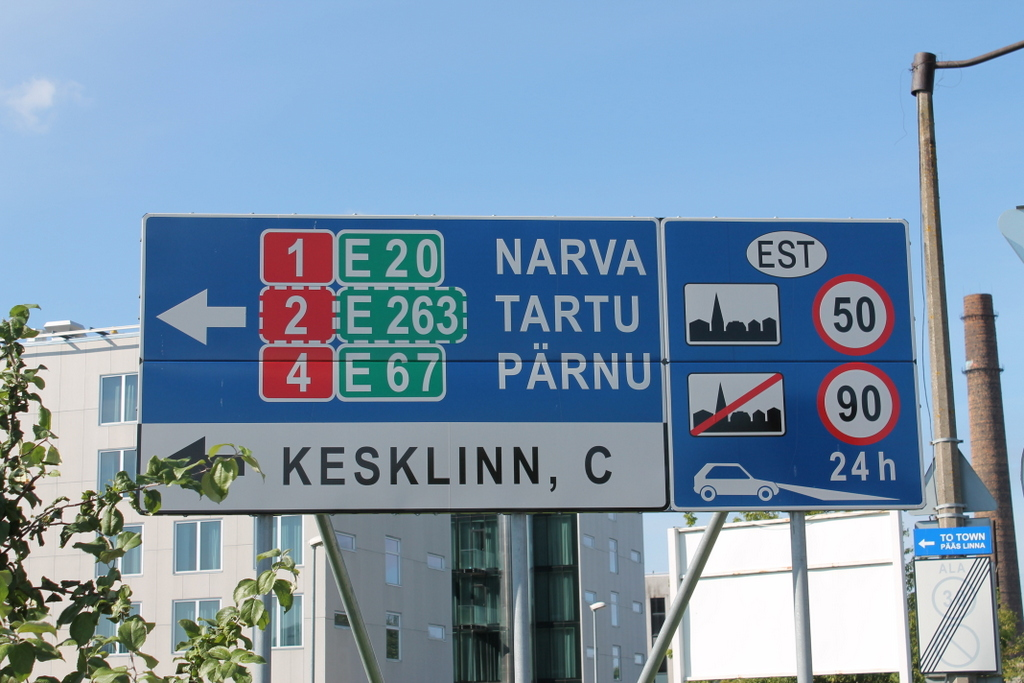
At the Northern beginning at the port of Tallinn

European route E 67 is an E-road running from Prague in the Czech Republic to Estonia and by ferry to Finland. It goes via Prague, Wrocław, Warsaw, Kaunas, Panevėžys, Riga, Tallinn, Helsinki.

The route is known as the Via Baltica between Warsaw and Tallinn, with a distance of 970 kilometres (600 mi). It is a significant road connection between the Baltic states and Poland. The Kaunas - Ełk section is a shared segment of Via Baltica and Via Carpatia.

The route is mostly a motorway or expressway with some sections of a 2+1 road and single carriageway. Along the Via Baltica highway, the stretch of European route E67 between Warsaw and Tallinn, a 5G mobile network will be built in order to facilitate self-driving vehicles and expand opportunities for freight carriers.

== Environmental concerns ==
The Via Baltica attracted great controversy in 2007, as its planned new express road was to take it through several areas in Poland of great natural value. Most controversial was the Augustów bypass, which would take the route through the wetlands of the Rospuda Valley, the last area of its kind remaining in Europe, and an area protected by EU law as part of the European Natura 2000 Network. In July 2007 Polish Prime Minister Jarosław Kaczyński halted work on the bypass after the European Commission applied for an immediate injunction. After an intense campaign of protests in Poland and abroad and also counter-protests by the local community, the plans have been changed, and now the highway has been rerouted to completely avoid the wilderness area. The road was inaugurated on 20 October 2025 in a ceremony led by Lithuanian President Gitanas Nausėda and Polish president Karol Nawrocki at the Lithuania–Poland border.

== Route ==
Finland

- Helsinki

: Helsinki – Tallinn

Estonia

- T4: Tallinn – Laagri – Märjamaa – Pärnu-Jaagupi – Pärnu – Häädemeeste – Ikla – (Estonia) / (Latvia) border crossing

Latvia

- A 1: (Estonia) / (Latvia) border crossing – Ainaži – Salacgrīva – Saulkrasti – Ādaži – Riga
- A 4: Riga
- A 6: Riga
- A 5: Riga
- A 7: Riga – Iecava – Bauska – Grenctāle – (Latvia) / (Lithuania) border crossing

Lithuania

- A 10: (Latvia) / (Lithuania) border crossing – Pasvalys – Panevėžys
- A 17: Panevėžys
- A 8: Panevėžys – Kėdainiai – Juodoniai
- A 1: Juodoniai (Start of Concurrency with E85) – Kaunas (End of Concurrency with E85)
- A 5: Kaunas – Marijampolė – (Lithuania) / (Poland) border crossing

Poland

- S 61: (Lithuania) / (Poland) border crossing – Suwałki – Łomża – Ostrów Mazowiecka
- S 8: Ostrów Mazowiecka – Wyszków – Warsaw (Short concurrency with E30 and E77) – Paszków – Nadarzyn – Radziejowice – Mszczonow – Rawa Mazowiecka – Tomaszów Mazowiecki – Piotrków Trybunalski
- A 1: Piotrków Trybunalski (Start of Concurrency with E75) – Rokszyce – Łódź
- S 8: Łódź (End of Concurrency with E75) – Łask – Zduńska Wola – Sieradz – Kepno – Olesnica – Wrocław – Domasław
- DK 8: Domasław – Kobierzyce – Jordanów Śląski – Łagiewniki – Ząbkowice Śląskie – Klodzko – Kudowa-Zdrój – (Poland) / (Czech Republic) border crossing

In Poland, the E67 road is a dual carriageway expressway for most of its route, with two lanes in each direction.

Czech Republic

- I/33: (Poland) / (Czech Republic) border crossing – Náchod – Česká Skalice – Jaroměř
- D11: Jaroměř – Smiřice – Hradec Králové – Chlumec nad Cidlinou – Poděbrady – Prague

== See also ==
- Rail Baltica
- Estonian national road 4
- A1 road (Latvia)
- A4 road (Latvia)
- A6 road (Latvia)
- A5 road (Latvia)
- A7 road (Latvia)
- A5 highway (Lithuania)
- Expressway S61 (Poland)
- Expressway S8 (Poland)
- D11 motorway (Czech Republic)
- Suwałki Gap, which the route crosses
