= A8 highway (Lithuania) =

Highway in Lithuania

A8
- Panevėžys-Aristava-Sitkūnai

Route information
- Part of E67
- Length: 87.86 km (54.59 mi)

Major junctions
- From: Panevėžys
- To: Sitkūnai

Location
- Country: Lithuania
- Major cities: Kėdainiai

Highway system
- Transport in Lithuania

The A8 highway is a highway in Lithuania (Magistraliniai keliai). It runs from Panevėžys, through Kėdainiai bypass to the interchange with A1 highway near Sitkūnai. From there, the road continues to Kaunas, Vilnius, Klaipėda or Warsaw. The length of the road is 87.86 km.

The speed limit along most of the road length is 90 km/h. It is one of the most important transit roads in the Baltic States (part of Via Baltica corridor).

This route is part of International E-road network (part of European route E67).

There are distant plans to reconstruct most of the road as a motorway. Currently, 2+1 road is planned.

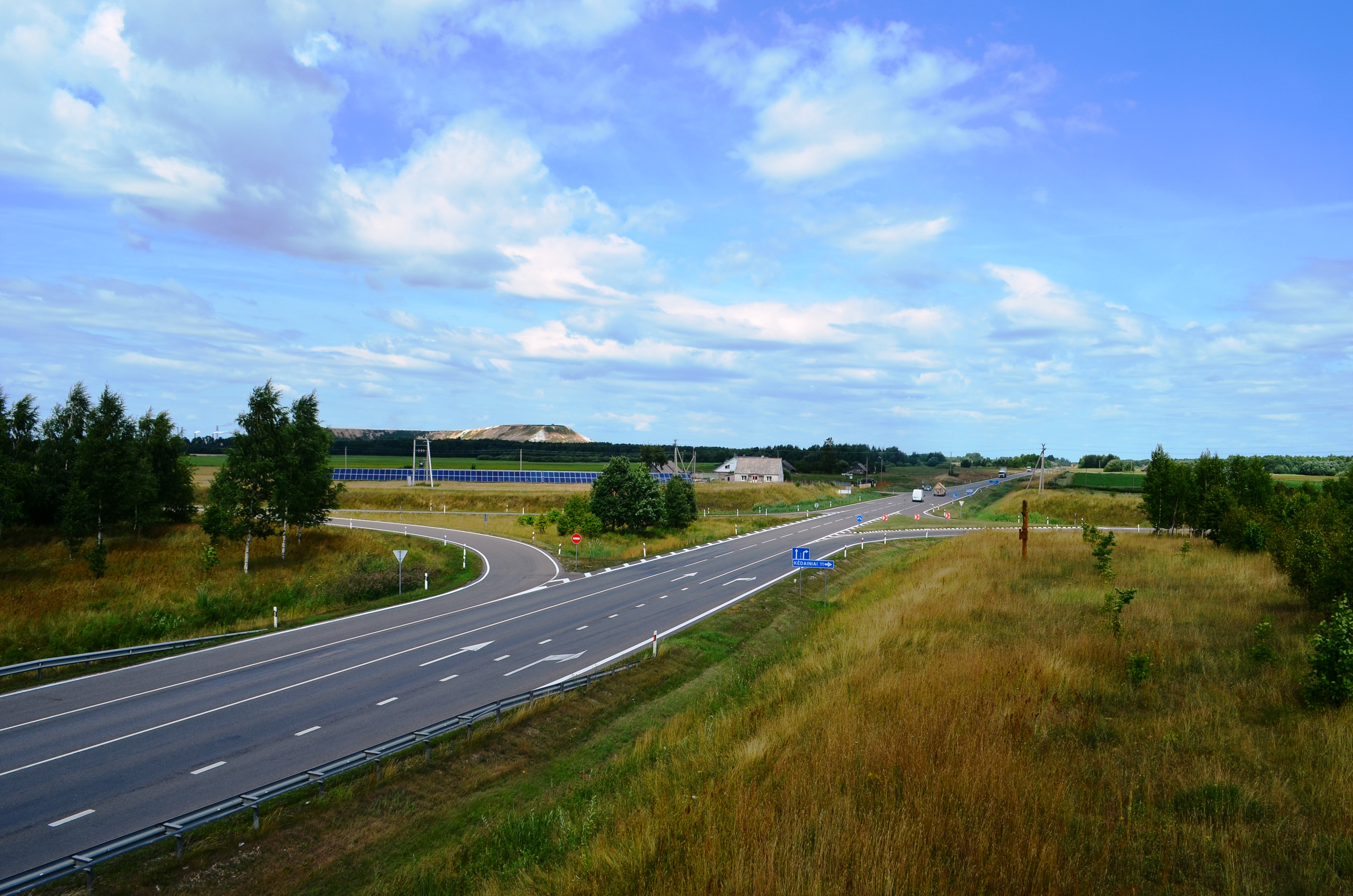
A8 road section near Kėdainiai
