= European route E262 =

Road in trans-European E-road network

E262

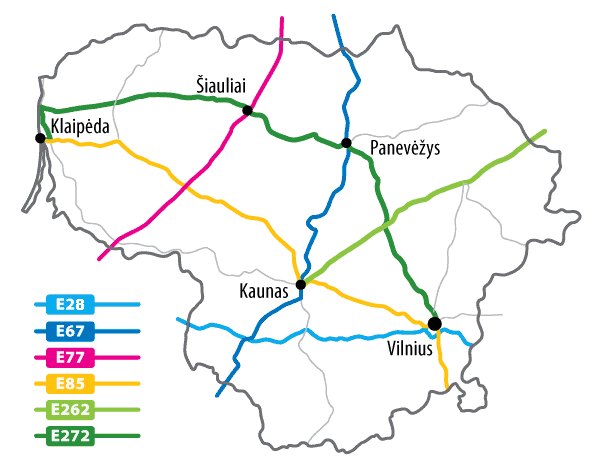

Major junctions
- From: Kaunas (Lithuania)
- To: Ostrov (Russia)

Location
- Countries: Lithuania; Latvia; Russia
- Major cities: Kaunas; Ukmergė; Daugavpils; Rēzekne; Ostrov

Highway system
- International E-road network; A Class; B Class

European route E 262 is a road part of the International E-road network. It begins in Kaunas, Lithuania and ends in Ostrov, Pskov Oblast, Russia.

== Route ==
Lithuania

- A 6: Kaunas - Ukmergė - Zarasai

Latvia

- A 13 A 14 A 15: Daugavpils - Rēzekne - Grebņeva

Russia

- 58K-306: Vyshgorodok - Ostrov

== Gallery ==
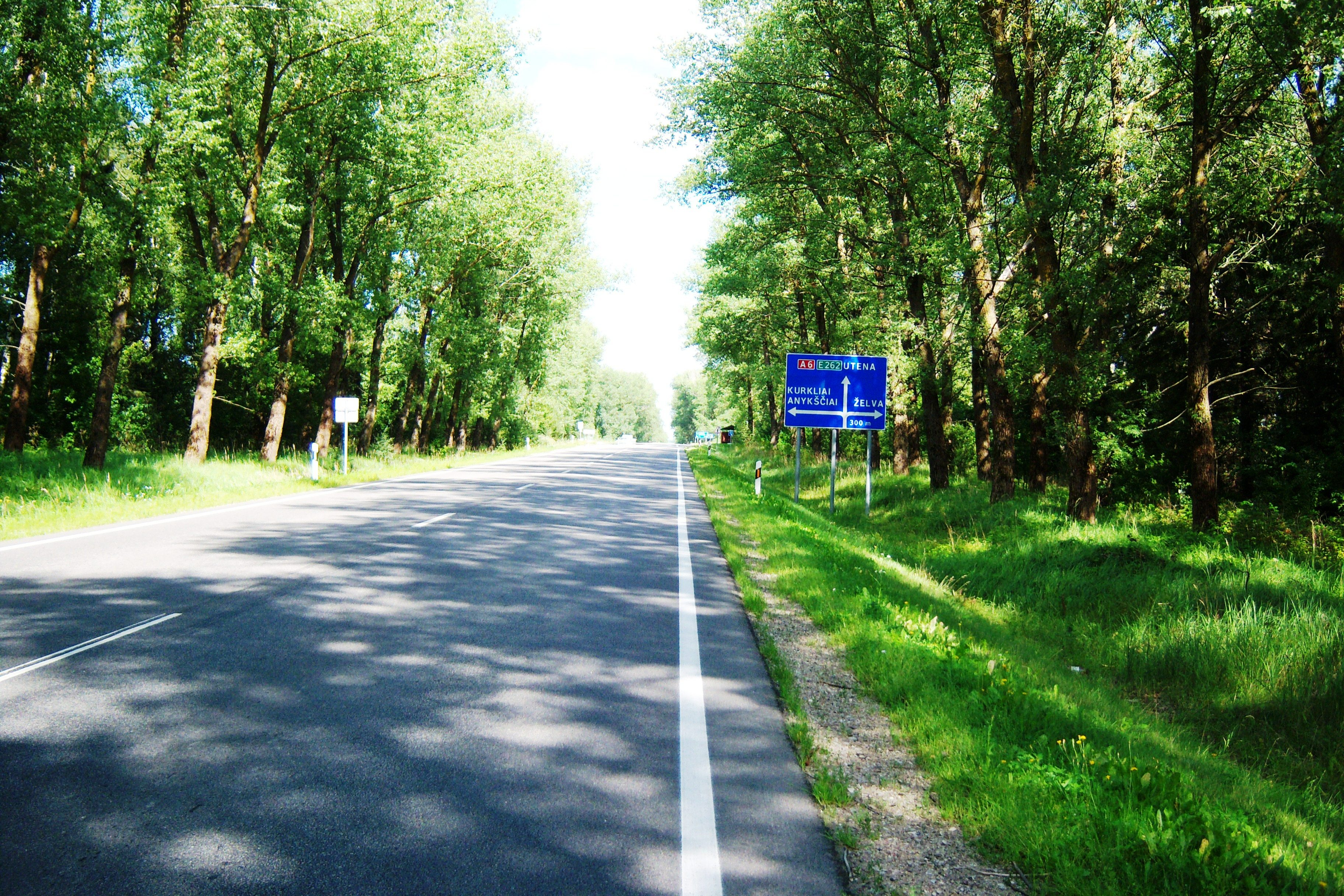
A6 highway near Kurkliai, Lithuania

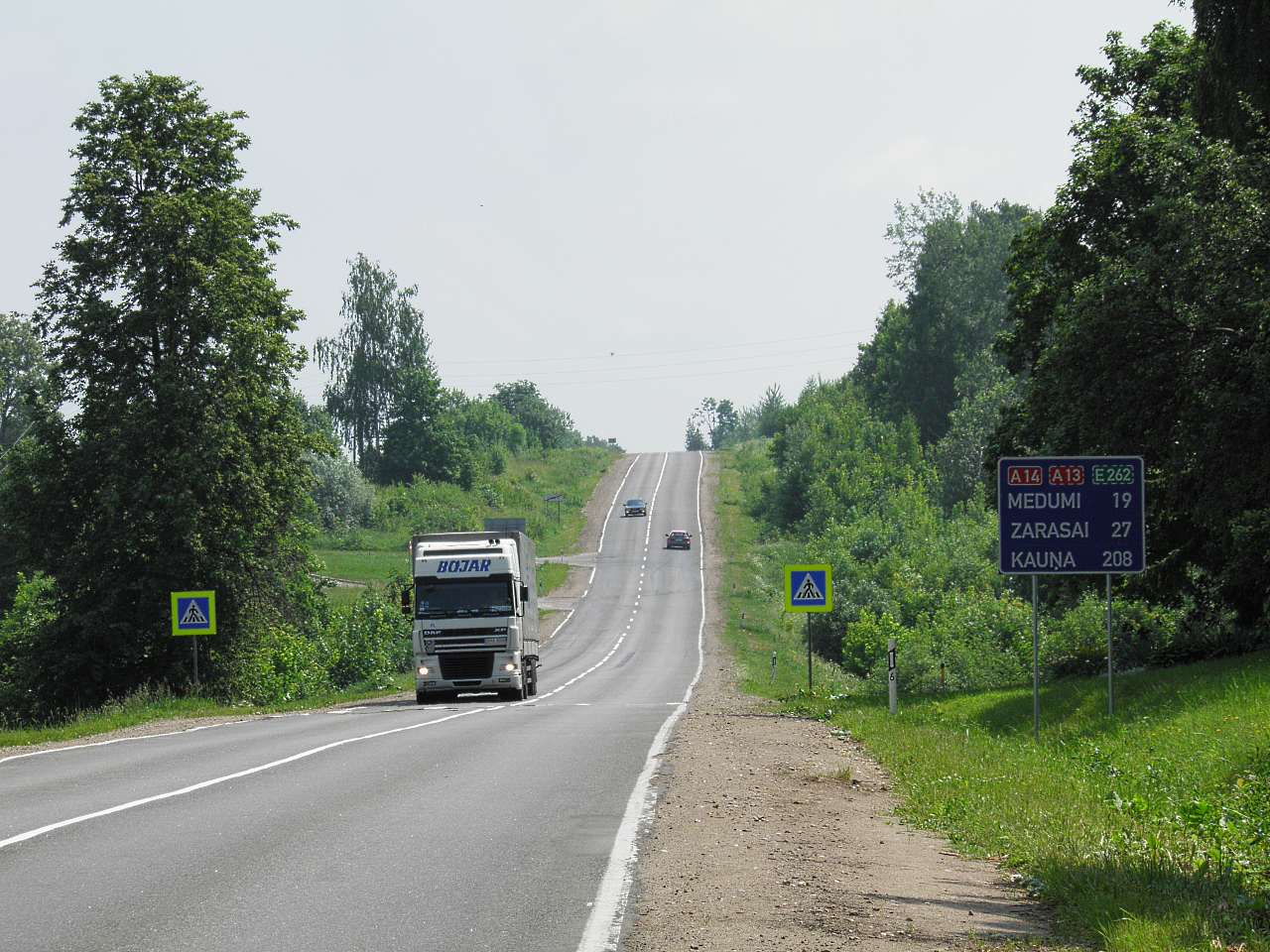
A14 in Svente Parish, Latvia

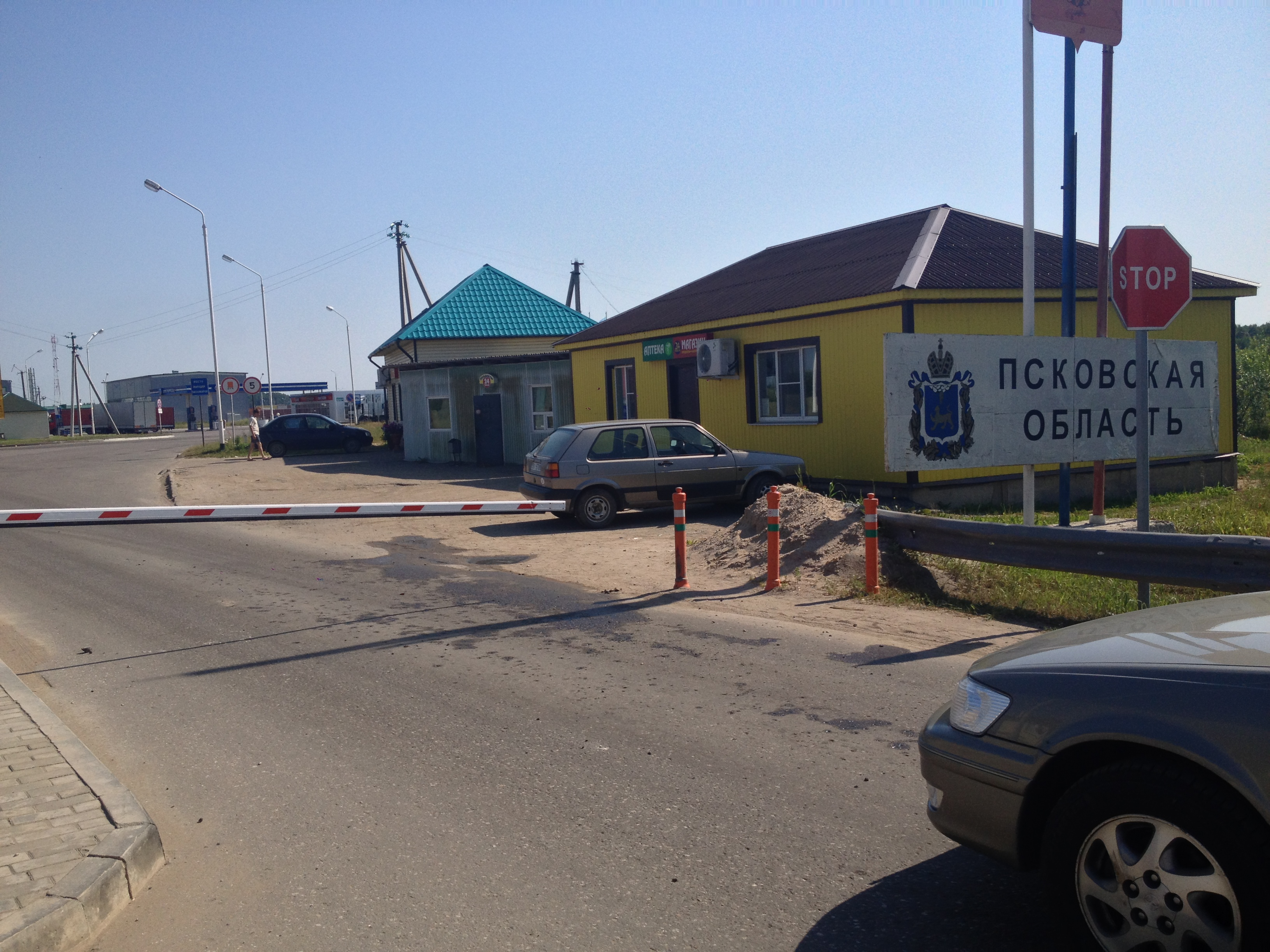
Latvia–Russia border crossing (2013)
