= A11 highway (Lithuania) =

Road in Lithuania

A11
- Šiauliai-Palanga

Route information
- Part of E272
- Length: 146.85 km (91.25 mi)

Major junctions
- From: Šiauliai
- To: Palanga

Location
- Country: Lithuania
- Major cities: Kuršėnai, Telšiai, Plungė, Kretinga

Highway system
- Transport in Lithuania

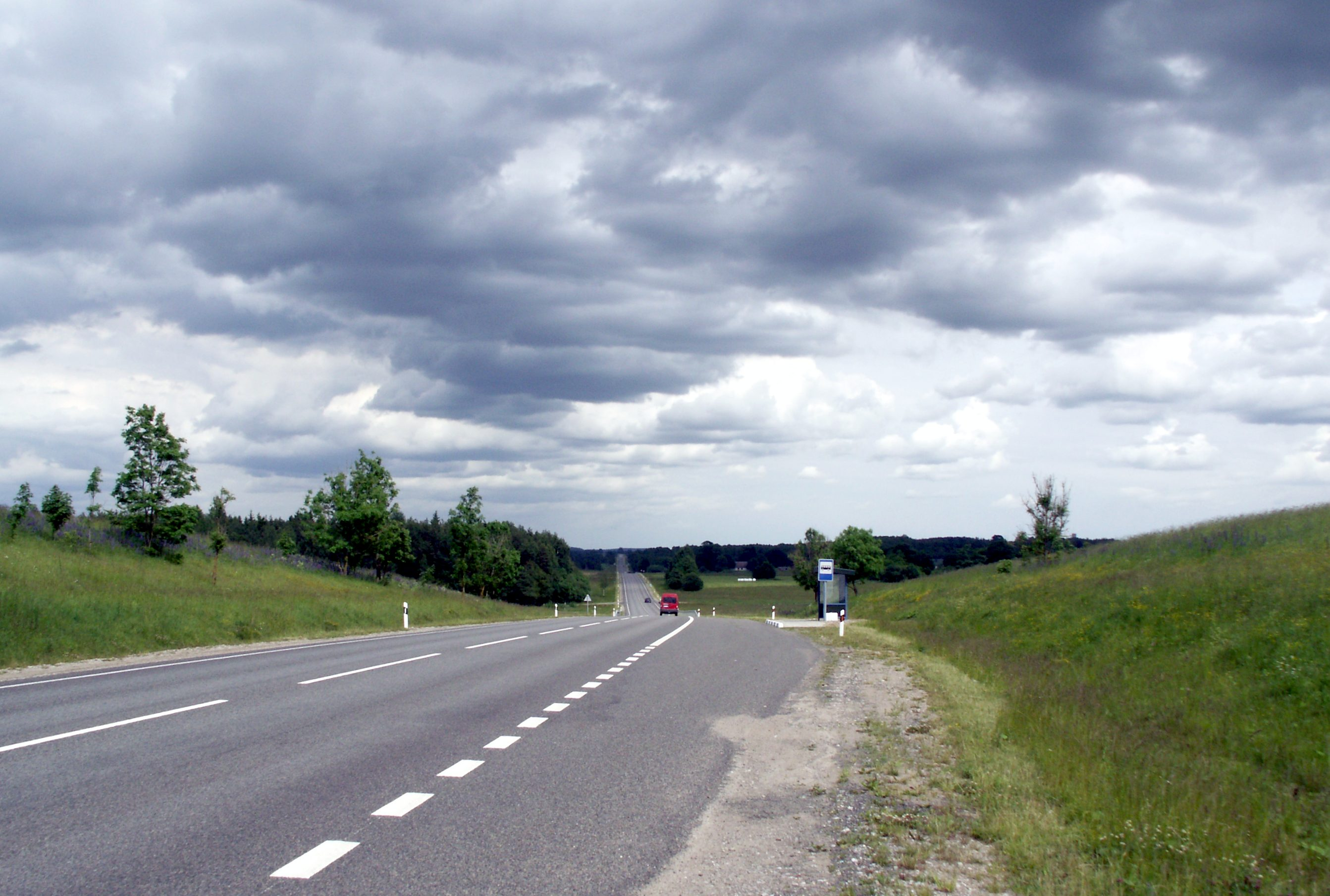
Highway near Plungė

The A11 highway is a highway in Lithuania (Magistralinis kelias). It runs from Šiauliai to the seaside resort town Palanga. The length of the road is 146.85 km.

The speed limit for most of the road length is 90–110 km/h. It's the most important road in the Northern Samogitia, connecting major towns of that region: Kuršėnai, Telšiai, Plungė, Kretinga.

Road section between Šiauliai and A18 road (Šiauliai bypass) is refurbished to 2+1 profile with guard rail dividing both directions. First rural modern 2+1 profile section in Lithuania. Road section between A18 junction and Kuršėnai is dual-carriageway with at-grade crossings and traffic lights. Remaining section is regular 1+1 with speed limits varying from default urban speed limits up to 50 km/h, and up to 90 km/h in rural areas.

This route is a part of the International E-road network (part of European route E272).
