= A5 highway (Lithuania) =

Highway in Lithuania

A5
- Kaunas-Marijampolė-Suwałki Highway

Route information
- Part of E67
- Length: 97.86 km (60.81 mi)
- Existed: 19th century - (new parts 1997-2002)–present

Major junctions
- From: Kaunas; Lithuania
- To: Suwałki; Poland; Expressway S61

Location
- Country: Lithuania
- Major cities: Marijampolė, Kalvarija

Highway system
- Transport in Lithuania

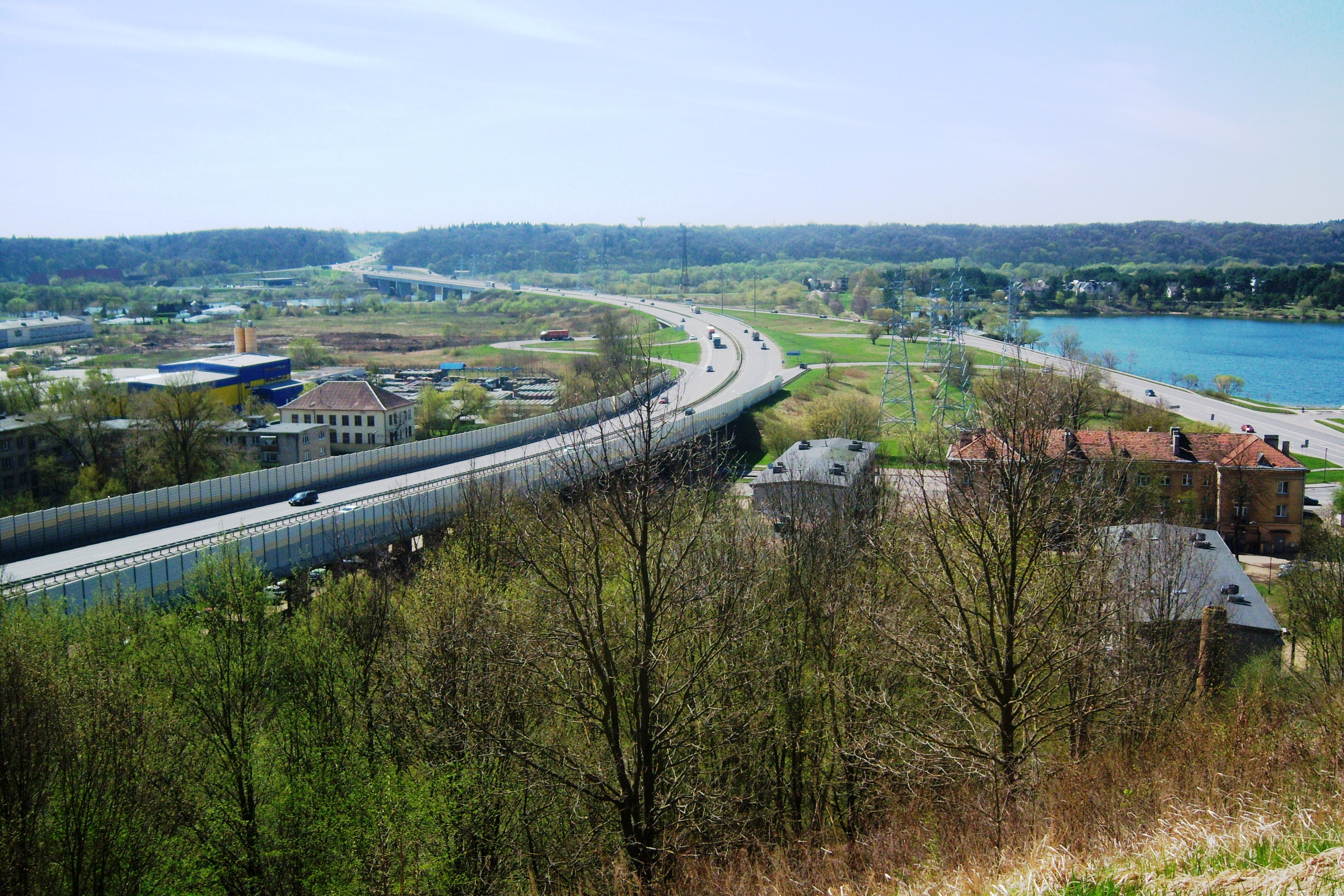
Western Bypass of Kaunas near Lampėdžiai. Lampėdžiai Bridge is visible in the distance

The A5 highway is a highway in Lithuania (Magistralinis kelias). It runs from Kaunas to the Polish border, toward Suwałki and ultimately Warsaw. The length of the road is 97.86 km (60.81 mi). A section of the A5 highway - Kaunas-Marijampolė, has been upgraded to a motorway, accessed only via grade-separated junctions, and completed in 2017/18. It is the first motorway built after Lithuania entered the European Union in 2004. Another 12.5 km (7.8 mi) between Marijampolė and Kalvarija were completed by December 2023.

The remainder of the road is being upgraded to motorway specifications. It will connect Kaunas with expressway S61 in Poland. The road will be only motorway connection between the Lithuanian motorway network and the rest of the European motorway network. The entire reconstruction up to the Polish border is due to be completed by the end of 2025. As of May 2024, 6 km (3.7 mi) in the Kaunas region and another 16 km (9.9 mi) in the Marijampolė region are under reconstruction.

== Old alignments and downgraded sections ==
=== Kalvarija–Polish Border section (KK201) ===
Following the completion of the modern A5 motorway expansion (part of the international Via Baltica corridor) between Kalvarija and the Lithuanian–Polish state border, the historical single-carriageway alignment was entirely decoupled from international transit. This legacy segment was subsequently downgraded in the national registry and reclassified as regional road KK201, operating under lowered speed limits to serve local and agricultural traffic.

==== Relocation of commercial services ====
The realignment of the primary A5 transit corridor prompted a significant restructuring of roadside commercial infrastructure near the border zone. To maintain access to high-volume international freight and passenger traffic, major fueling facilities relocated from the old bypassed segment to strategic plots flanking the newly opened expressway:

- Circle K Kalvarija I: Originally operating at the legacy address of Muitinės g. 13 in Trakėnai, the station was closed and rebuilt at Europos g. 13a (Salaperaugis), directly adjacent to the modern A5 alignment.
- Circle K Kalvarija II: Previously situated along the old highway route at Muitinės g. 22a in Trakėnai, the facility was relocated further inland to Muitinės g. 5b (Brazavas) to capture the shifted transit flows.

These newly constructed full-service hubs feature high-pressure heavy-goods vehicle (HGV) diesel pumps, expanded freight parking facilities, and automated checkout terminals tailored to modern cross-border logistics requirements.

== Principal cities along the route ==
- Kaunas
- Marijampolė
- Kalvarija
