= Transport in Lithuania =

Transport in Lithuania relies mainly on road and rail networks.

== Lithuanian road system ==
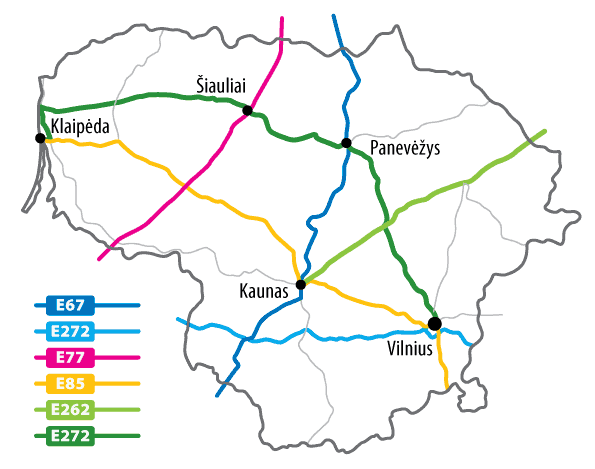
E-roads in Lithuania

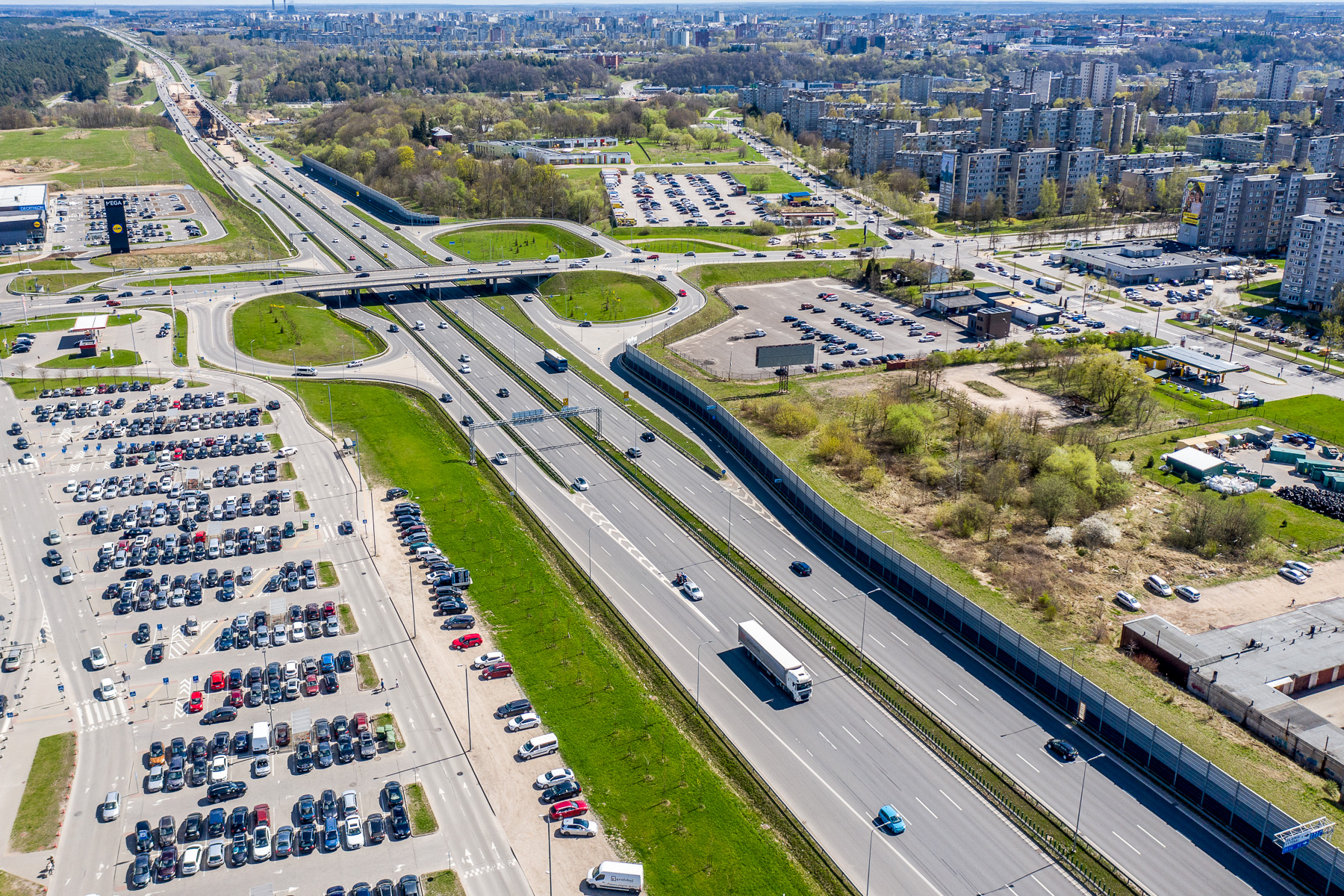
A1 motorway near Kaunas (98-101 km)

total: 21,238 kilometres (13,197 mi)
paved: 14,879 km (9,245 mi)
unpaved: 6,359 km (3,951 mi)

=== Controlled-access highways sections ===
There are two categories of controlled-access highways in Lithuania: expressways (Lithuanian: greitkeliai) with maximum speed 120 km/h and motorways (Lithuanian: automagistralės) with maximum speed 130 km/h.

==== Motorway sections ====
- A1 Kaunas – Klaipėda. Total length of the stretch: 195 km. The motorway ends for a short section near Sujainiai (Raseiniai district municipality) as the junction here is one-level and it is used by non-motorway vehicles.
- A2 Vilnius – Panevėžys. Total length of the stretch: 114 km.
- A5 Kaunas – Marijampolė. Total length of the stretch: 57 km.
- A1 Kaunas – Vilnius. There length of the stretch: 55 km (Kaunas – Vievis) and 16 km (Vievis – Grigiškės).

==== Expressway sections ====
- A9 Radviliškis – Šiauliai. Total length of the stretch: 10 km.

=== A road system ===
The A roads (Lithuanian: magistraliniai keliai) total 1,748.84 km (1,086.68 mi).

- A1 Vilnius – Kaunas – Klaipėda, 311.40 km (193.49 mi). Most important east to west corridor in Lithuania. Connects three largest Lithuanian cities: Vilnius, Kaunas and Klaipėda. Most of the road has motorway status.
- A2 Vilnius – Panevėžys, 135.92 km (84.46 mi). The stretch between Vilnius and Šilagalis has motorway status.
- A3 Vilnius – Medininkai Border Checkpoint, 33.99 km (21.12 mi). Continues to Belarus and connects Vilnius with the Belarusian capital of Minsk.
- A4 Vilnius – Raigardas Border Checkpoint, 134.46 km (83.55 mi). Continues to Grodno, Belarus.
- A5 Kaunas – border with Poland, 97.06 km (60.31 mi). The stretch from Kaunas to Marijampolė has motorway status. Continues towards Suwałki in Poland.
- A6 Kaunas – Daugavpils, 185.40 km (115.20 mi). Continues towards Daugavpils in Latvia.
- A7 Marijampolė – Kybartai Border Checkpoint, 42.21 km (26.23 mi). An important transit route to Kaliningrad Oblast.
- A8 Sitkūnai – Panevėžys, 87.86 km (54.59 mi).
- A9 Panevėžys – Šiauliai, 78.94 km (49.05 mi). Short 10 km expressway section.
- A10 Panevėžys – Bauska 66.10 km (41.07 mi). Continues to Bauska in Latvia. Important transit route to Riga.
- A11 Šiauliai – Palanga, 146.85 km (91.25 mi)
- A12 border with Latvia – Panemunė Border Checkpoint(with Kaliningrad), 186.09 km (115.63 mi)
- A13 Klaipėda – Liepaja, 45.15 km (28.05 mi)
- A14 Vilnius – Utena, 95.60 km (59.40 mi)
- A15 Vilnius – Lida, 49.28 km (30.62 mi)
- A16 Vilnius – Marijampolė, 137.51 km (85.44 mi)
- A17 Panevėžys Bypass, 22.28 km (13.84 mi).
- A18 Šiauliai Bypass, 17.08 km (10.61 mi)
- A19 Vilnius Southern Bypass, 7.9 km (4.9 mi)
- A20 Ukmergė Northern Bypass, 7.7 km (4.8 mi)
- A21 Panemunė Eastern Bypass, 4 km (2.5 mi)

=== Major highway projects in Interwar Lithuania ===
Before World War I, there were few isolated routes suitable for transit traffic e.g. present day A12 highway, connecting Riga with Kaliningrad, or present day A6 highway which was part of highway Warsaw–Saint Petersburg that ran through Kaunas. After Lithuania became an independent country in 1918, there was increased demand for new highways for inner needs. First long-distance highways built exclusively by the Lithuanian government were opened in the late 1930s. These are following:

- Samogitian highway – old highway built in the 1930s, connecting Kaunas and Klaipėda. Road section between Kaunas and Ariogala is now completely refurbished to motorway, and the road section from Ariogala to Klaipėda is serving as alternative road for a parallelly-built A1 motorway and connects local towns such as Ariogala, Raseiniai and Rietavas.
- Aukštaitian highway – old highway built in the 1930s. It connects Kaunas, Kėdainiai, Panevėžys and Biržai to Riga. After building an original route, new routes were built through the course of Soviet Union and after its dissolution. The road was gradually rerouted to avoid larger urban areas, and now runs from Sitkūnai, bypasses Kėdainiai, Panevėžys, Pasvalys, Biržai, and reaches Latvian border to Riga. Rerouted highway is now part of Via Baltica.

=== Museum ===
- Lithuanian Road Museum

== Railways ==
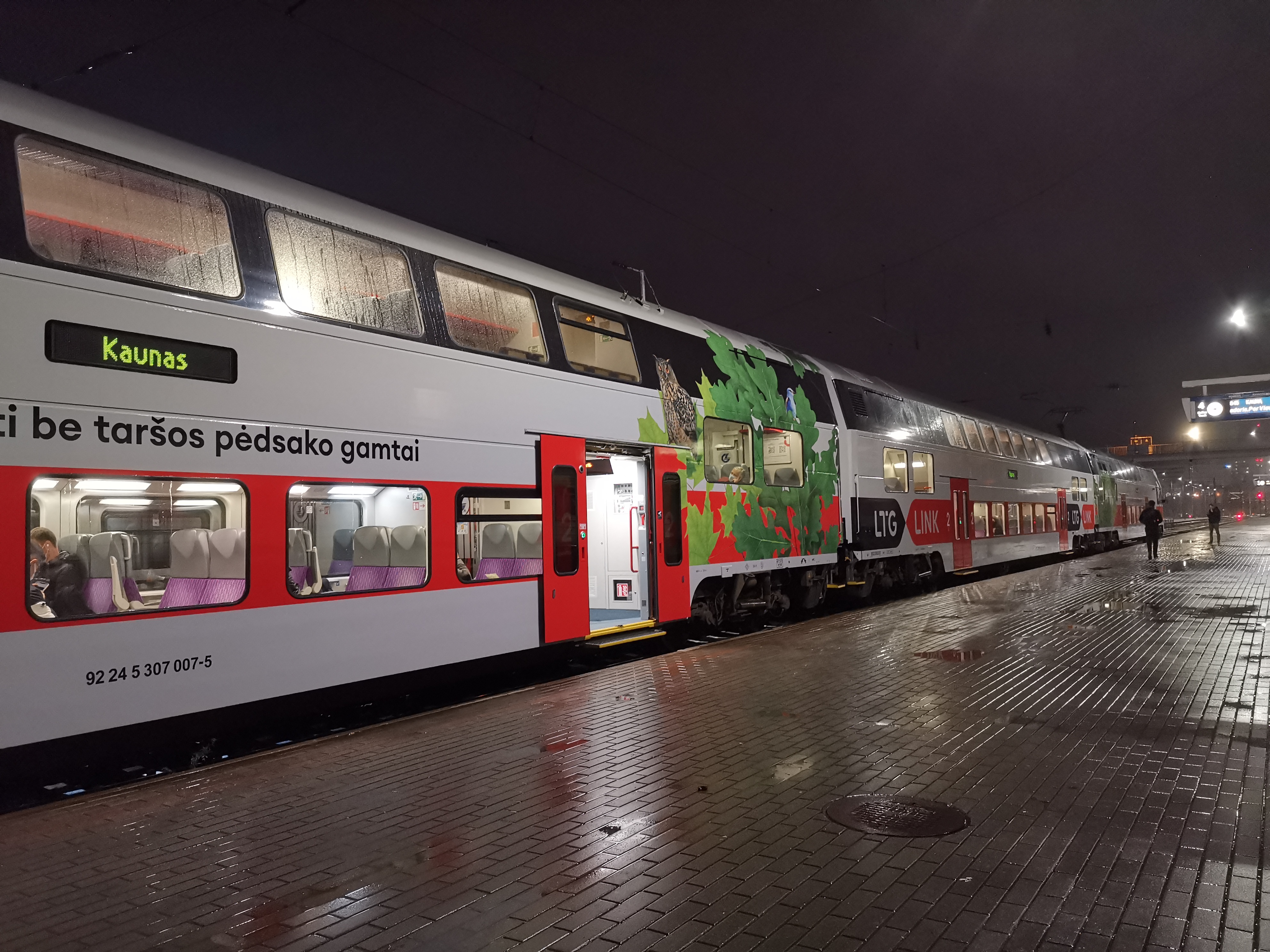
LTG Link train in Vilnius

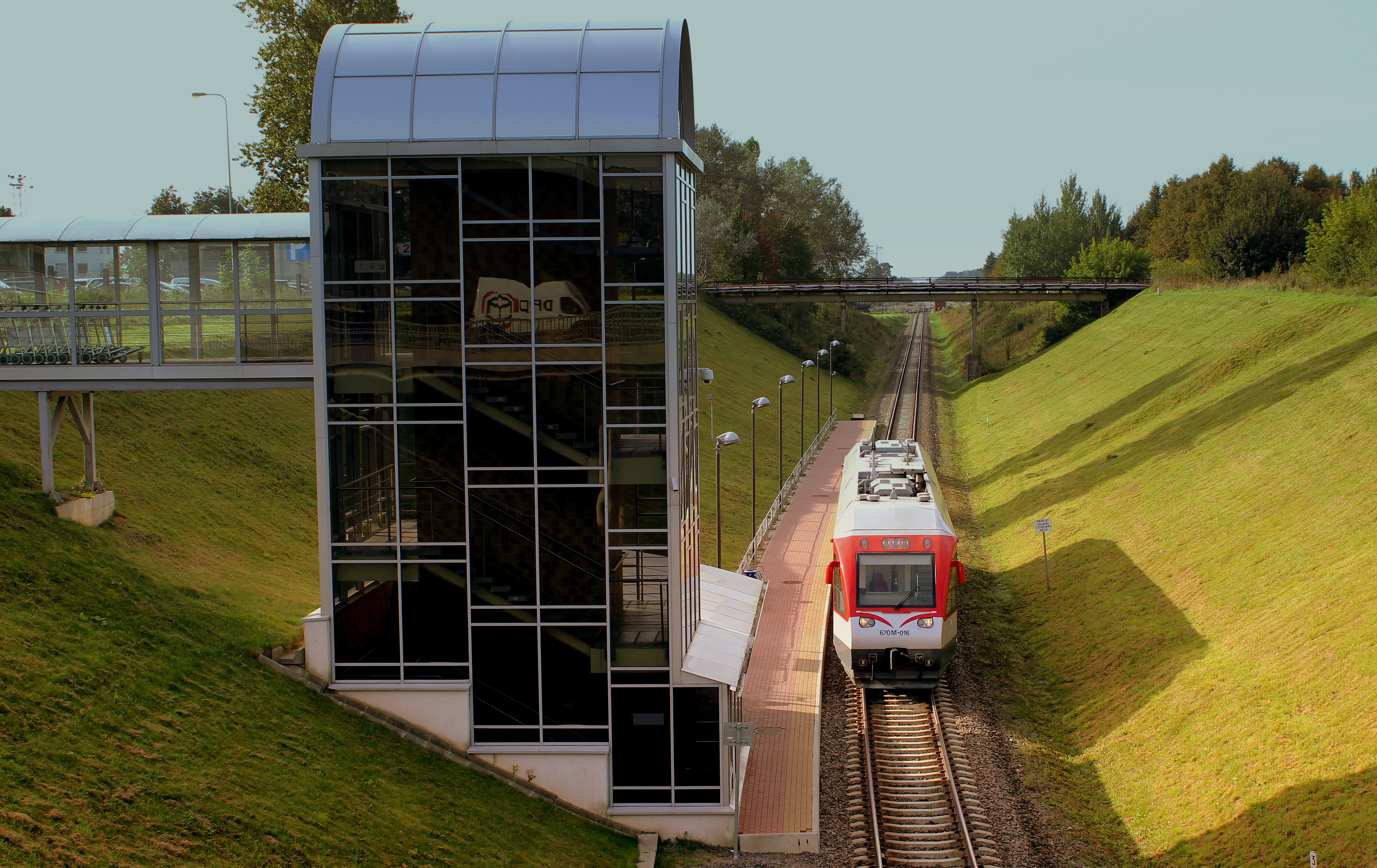
Train station in Vilnius Airport

There is a total of 1,998 route km of railways, of which:

- 1,807 km are broad gauge of 1,520 mm (4 ft 11 27/32 in) – 122 km of which are electrified
- 169 km are narrow gauge of 750 mm (2 ft 5 1/2 in) – as of 2001
- 22 km are standard gauge of 1,435 mm (4 ft 8 1/2 in)

=== Rail links with adjacent countries ===
- Latvia – yes
- Belarus – yes
- Russia (Kaliningrad) – yes
- Poland – yes – break-of-gauge 1,520 mm (4 ft 11 27/32 in) / 1,435 mm (4 ft 8 1/2 in)

== Waterways ==
There are 600 kilometres (370 mi) that are perennially navigable.

== Pipelines ==
In 1992, there were 105 km (65 mi) of crude oil pipelines, and 760 km (470 mi) of natural gas pipelines.

== Ports and harbours ==
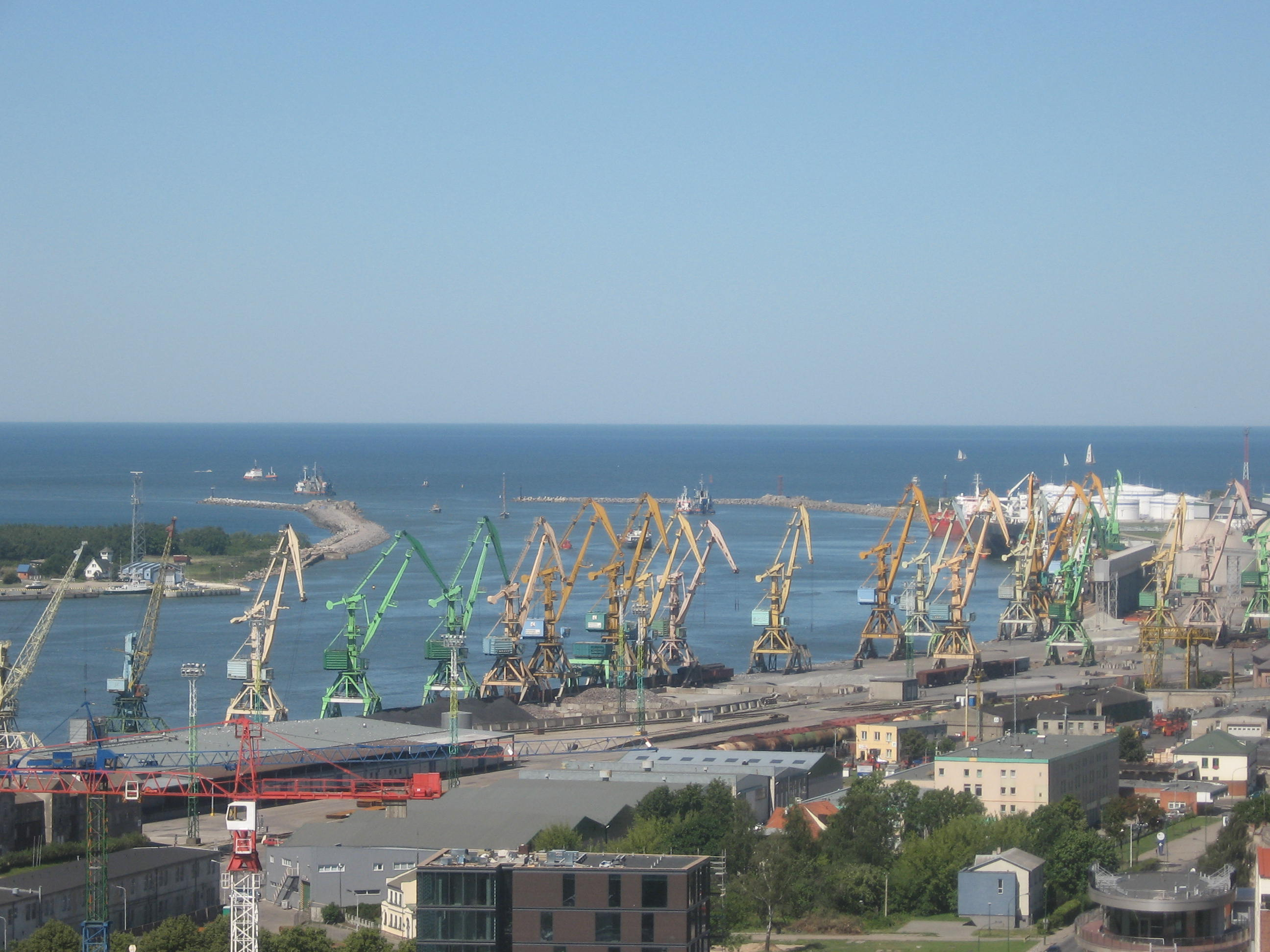
Klaipėda port

=== Sea ports ===
- Port of Klaipėda
- Būtingė oil terminal

=== River ports ===
- Kaunas
- Rumšiškės
- Nida
- Juodkrantė

== Merchant marine ==
The merchant marine consists of 47 ships of 1,000 GT or over, together totaling 279,743 GT/304,156 tonnes deadweight (DWT).

Ships by type: Cargo 25, Combination bulk 8, Petroleum tanker 2, Railcar carrier 1, Refrigerated cargo 6, Roll on/roll off 2, Short-sea passenger 3.

Note: These totals include some foreign-owned ships registered here as a flag of convenience: Denmark 13 (2002 est.)

== Airports ==
In Lithuania, there are four international airports:

- Vilnius Čiurlionis International Airport
- Kaunas Airport
- Palanga International Airport
- Šiauliai International Airport
- Paved Runways: 9 in total
  - over 3,047 m: 2
  - 1,524 to 2,437 m: 4
  - under 914 m: 3
- Unpaved runways: 63 in total
  - 2,438 to 3,047 m: 3
  - 914 to 1,523 m: 5
  - under 914 m: 55
