= A6 highway (Lithuania) =

Highway in Lithuania

A6
- Kaunas-Utena-Zarasai

Route information
- Part of E262
- Length: 185.40 km (115.20 mi)

Major junctions
- From: Kaunas
- To: Zarasai; Latvia; E262 / A 13

Location
- Country: Lithuania
- Major cities: Jonava, Ukmergė, Utena, Zarasai

Highway system
- Transport in Lithuania

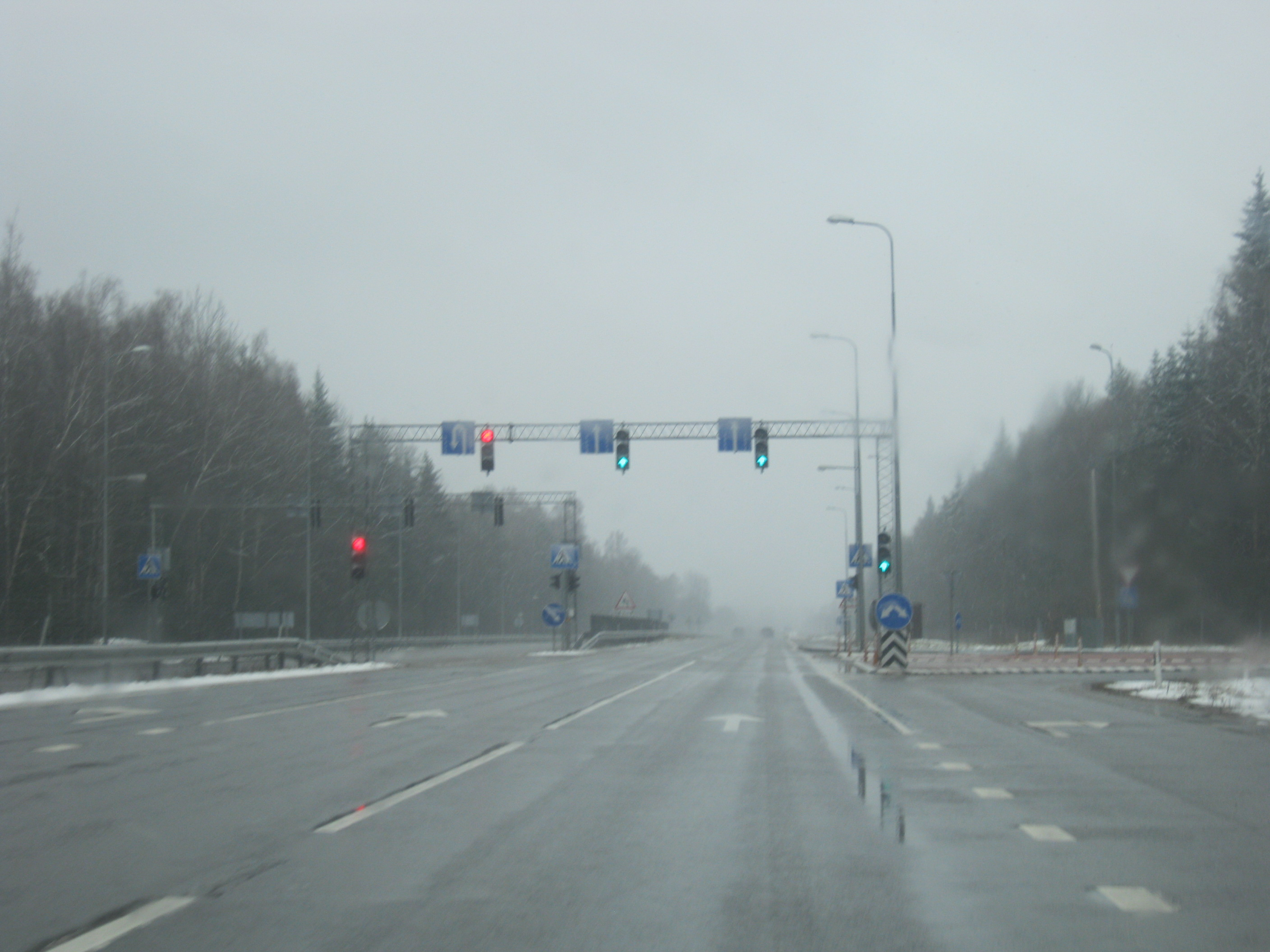
At-grade dual-carriageway junction with traffic lights between Karmėlava and Jonava

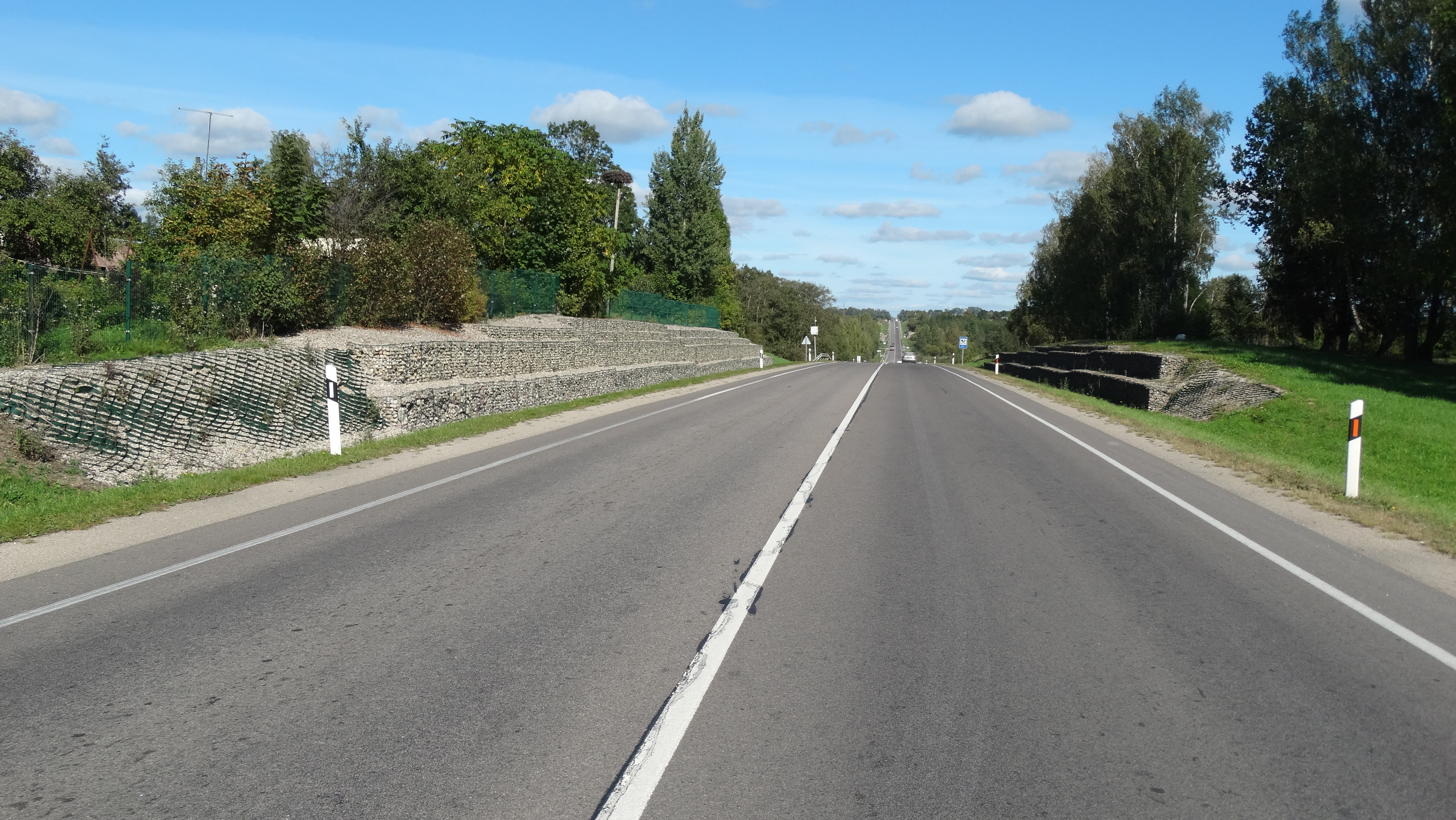
1+1 road section near Utena

The A6 highway is a highway in Lithuania (Magistralinis kelias). It runs from Kaunas to the Latvian border near Zarasai. From there, the road continues to Daugavpils as A13. The length of the road is 185.40 km.

The speed limit for most of the length of A6 is default 90–106 km/h (outside city limits) with few urban sections with default 40–67 km/h speed limit. The section from Kaunas to Jonava has been upgraded to a dual carriageway with at-grade junctions, at-grade pedestrian crossing points, U-turns and traffic-lights. The remaining sections are roads with one lane in each direction, leading through towns like Ukmergė, Utena and Zarasai.

This route is a part of International E-road network (part of European route E262).

In July 2023, the new project was approved for rerouting A6 from the south of Jonava to the suburbs of Skaruliai and Šveicarija. The construction works is expected to start in 2024.
