= A4 highway (Lithuania) =

Highway in Lithuania

A4
- Vilnius – Varėna – Druskininkai

Route information
- Length: 134.46 km (83.55 mi)

Major junctions
- From: Vilnius
- To: Grodno; Belarus P 42

Location
- Country: Lithuania
- Major cities: Varėna, Druskininkai

Highway system
- Transport in Lithuania

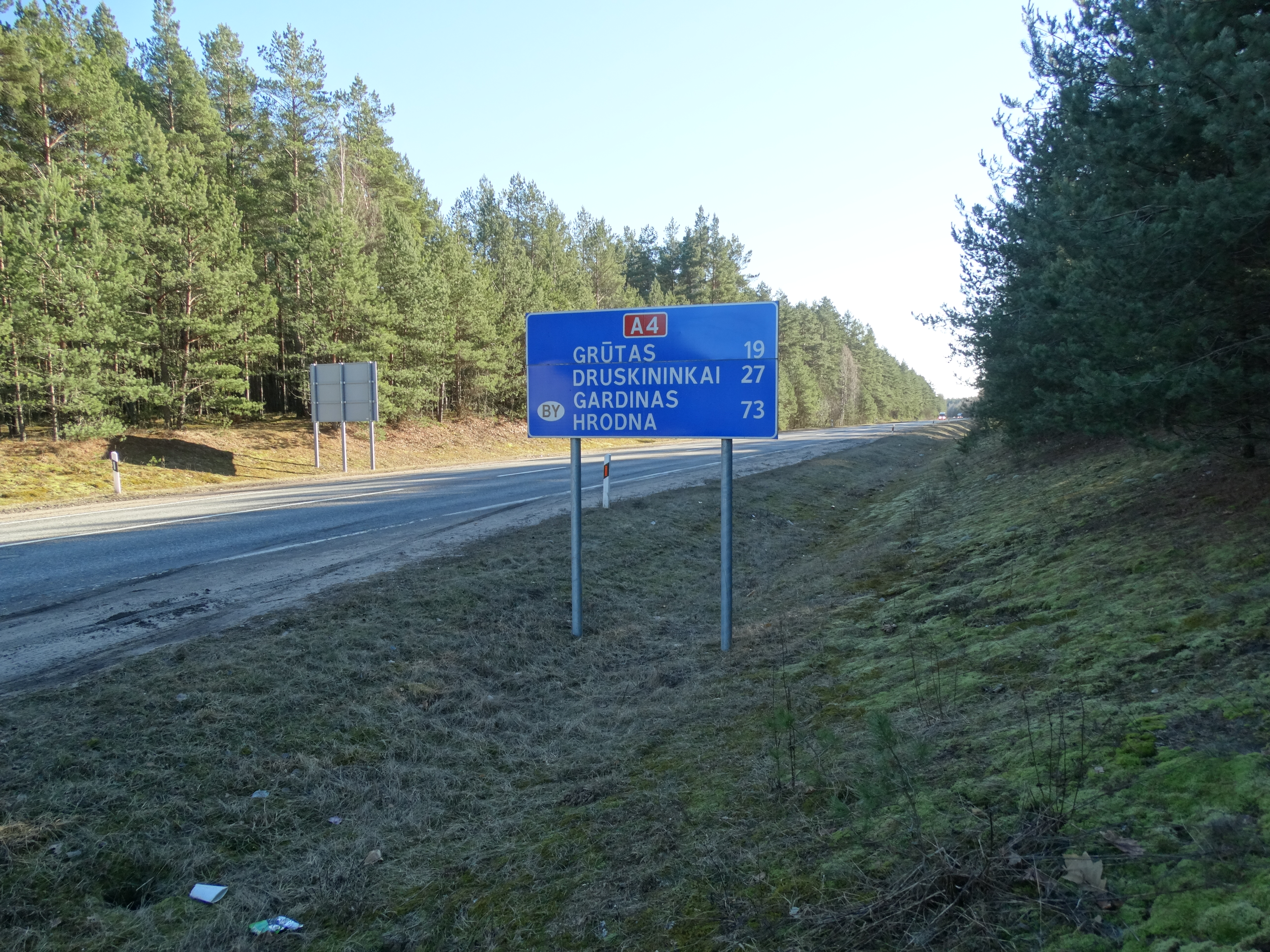
Distance sign near Merkinė

The A4 highway is a highway in Lithuania (Magistralinis kelias). It runs from Vilnius to the Belarus border, near Druskininkai. From there the road continues to Grodno as P 42. The length of the road is 134.46 km.

Most of the road has one lane per each direction and default 90 km/h speed limit. It is the main road connecting Vilnius with the Dzūkija region.
