= List of defunct airlines of Latvia =

This is a list of defunct airlines of Latvia.

Airline	Image	IATA	ICAO	Callsign	Commenced operations	Ceased operations	Notes
Alpha Express Airlines			APZ		2012	2014	
Baltic Express Line			LTB	BEL Baltic Express	1993	2001	
Baltic International Airlines		TI	BIA		1991	1995	Rebranded as Air Baltic
Baltija Airlines			COS		1993	1993	Renamed/merged to LatCharter Airlines
Concors			COS		1991	2005	
Inversija		IA	INV	INVERS	1991	2012	
LAT-ALAK					1994	1995	
Latavio		PV	LTL	LATAVIO	1992	1996	
LatCharter Airlines		6Y	LTC		1992	2008	Rebranded as SmartLynx Airlines
Latpass Airlines		QJ	LTP		1995	2004	
Latvian Airlines					1991	1992	Renamed/merged to Latavio
Latvijas Gaisa Satiksmes Akciju Sabiedriba					1922	1925	Was finally dissolved in 1928
Primera Air Nordic		6F	PRW	JETBIRD	2014	2018	
Riair		GV	RIG	Riga Airlines	1992	1999	
SmartLynx Airlines		6Y	ART	SMART LYNX	1992	2025	
Transeast Airlines		T4	TRL	LATTRANS	1992	2001	
Valsts gaisa satiksme					1937	1940	After Soviet occupation of Latvia in 1940 was absorbed into Aeroflot.
VIP Avia					2000	2019	

== See also ==
- List of airlines of Latvia
- List of airports in Latvia
