= International School of Latvia =

School in Jurmala, Latvia

- Latvijas Starptautiskā skola

Location
- Meistaru iela 2, Futā Novads; Piņķi, Babīte Parish, Mārupe Municipality LV-2107; Latvia; 56°56′43″N 23°54′21″E

Information
- Established: 1994; 32 years ago
- Grades: From preschool till 12
- Age range: 2 to 18
- Website: isl.edu.lv

The International School of Latvia (Latvian: Latvijas Starptautiskā skola), founded in 1994, is an independent co-educational, non-profit, college preparatory day school, for students of all nationalities 2 – 18 years of age. The International School of Latvia is an English language learning environment. It is located within a 15-minute drive from the center of Riga in the village of Piņķi in Babīte Parish, Mārupe Municipality near the coastal resort of Jūrmala. It was originally founded in Lithuania with the primary intent of teaching Hebrew, before moving to Latvia in 2010. In 2011 it became an English School under IB.

Students from over 45 countries, attend the school. In 2006, ISL had its first IB Diploma graduates.

== Administrative staff ==
As of August 2025

Position	Name
Director	Paul Johnson
Secondary School Principal	Mark Robinson-Jones
Elementary School Principal	Elizabeth Younk
Secondary College Counselor	Hubert James-Asch
International Culture Director	Kaspars Petrovs
