= Piņķi =

Village and center of Babīte Parish, Mārupe Municipality, Latvia

- Village
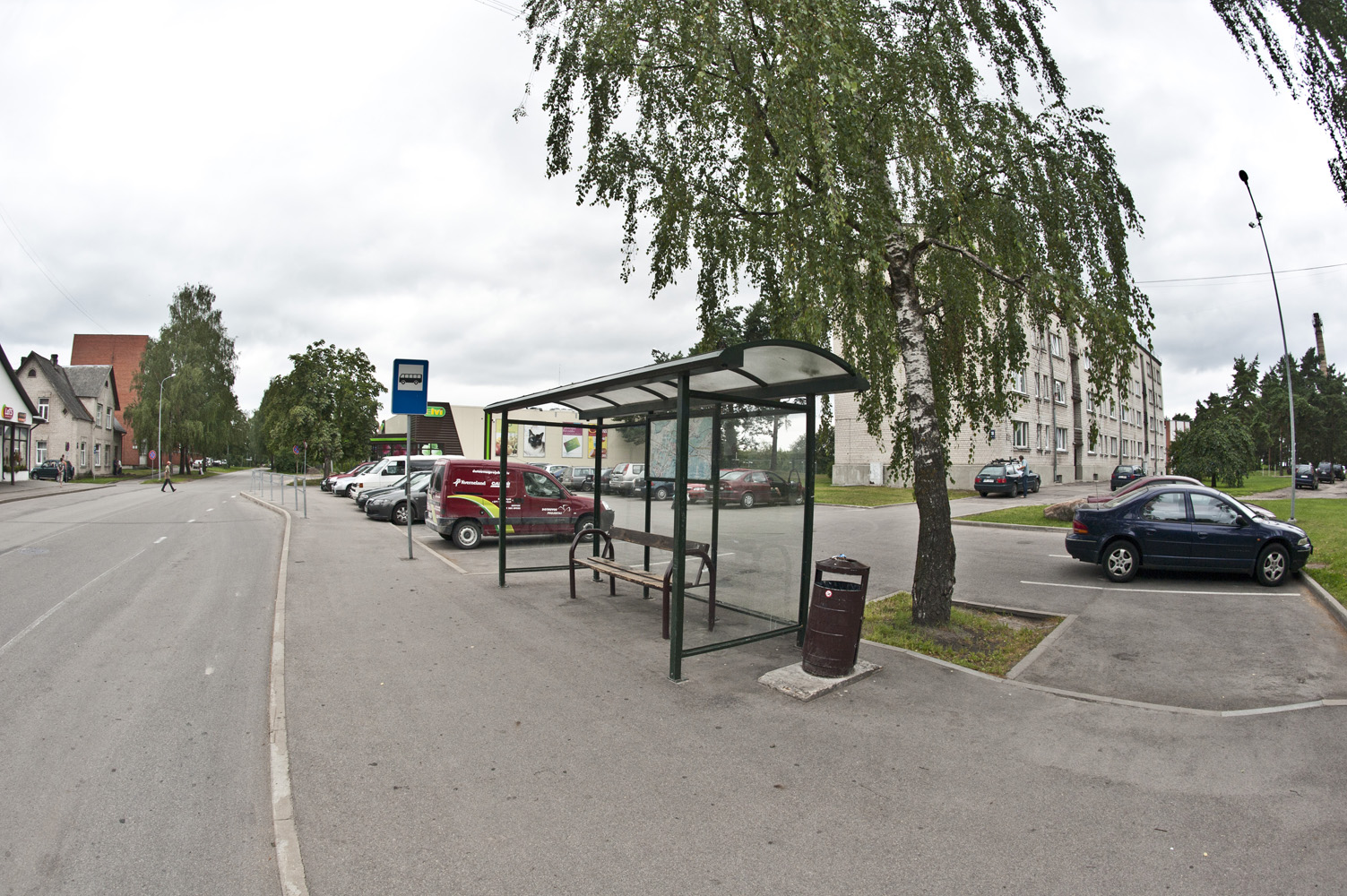

- Piņķi's location in Latvia
- Coordinates: 56°56′40″N 23°54′39″E
- Country: Latvia
- Municipality: Mārupe
- Parish: Babīte

Area
  - Total: 1.1 sq mi (2.9 km^{2})

Population (2024)
  - Total: 3,527

Piņķi (formerly Saliena) is a village and the administrative center of Babīte Parish in Mārupe Municipality, Latvia. Piņķi had 3,527 residents as of 2024.

The village has 4 schools in total, including Babīte Secondary School, public, and three international schools: Exupéry International School, King's College Latvia, and The International School of Latvia.
