= Concor (disambiguation) =

Concor is a South African construction company.

Concor may also refer to:

- Container Corporation of India (CONCOR), Public Sector Undertaking in India
- Concor, a brand name for formulations of the beta blocker bisoprolol
- Concor, a 2014 split EP by Tale of Us

== See also ==
- Concors, a defunct Latvian airline
