= SmartLynx =

SmartLynx may refer to:

- SmartLynx Airlines, a Latvian-based charter/cargo airline
- SmartLynx Australia, an airline formally operating as Skytrans
