= VIP Avia =

Latvian business aviation company

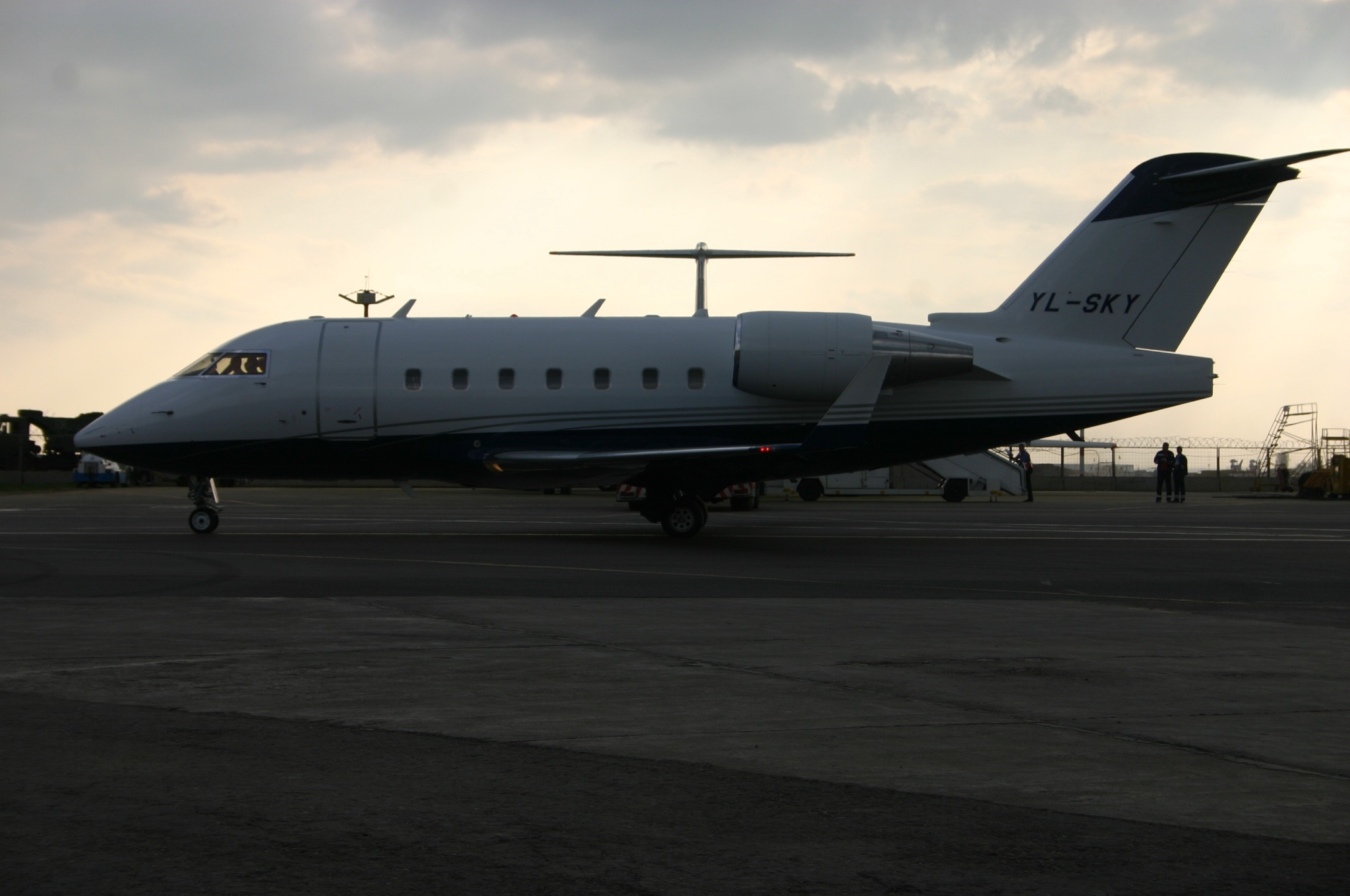
- VIP Avia Canadair Challenger
IATA	ICAO	Call sign
—	PRX	—
- Founded: 2000
- Ceased operations: 2019
- Operating bases: Riga International Airport
- Headquarters: Riga, Latvia

VIP Avia was a Latvian business aviation and private charter company based at Riga International Airport. The legal entity SIA "VIP AVIA" was registered on 16 November 2000 and later liquidated.

In 2006, Business Air News reported that VIP Avia had added a Challenger 604 to its fleet, bringing the charter fleet to four aircraft. The report also stated that the company operated three Hawker business jets: two Hawker 800XP aircraft and one Hawker 125-800B.

== History ==
VIP Avia operated in the Latvian business aviation market during the 2000s. In March 2007, the company presented a Hawker 4000 business jet at Riga International Airport; Dienas Bizness reported that the company's aircraft were also used for flights by the President of Latvia and that VIP Avia had operated business-class flights for more than ten years. In 2007, Aviation International News mentioned VIP Avia among business aviation operators in the newer European Union member states, describing the Riga-based operator as having three Hawker aircraft and a Challenger 604 in the charter market.

The company was later liquidated; company registry data published by Firmas.lv lists SIA "VIP AVIA" as a liquidated company.

== See also ==
- List of defunct airlines of Latvia
