= Babīte Municipality =

Former municipality of Latvia

Coordinates: 56°57′N 23°57′E

Babīte Municipality Babītes novads
- Former municipality
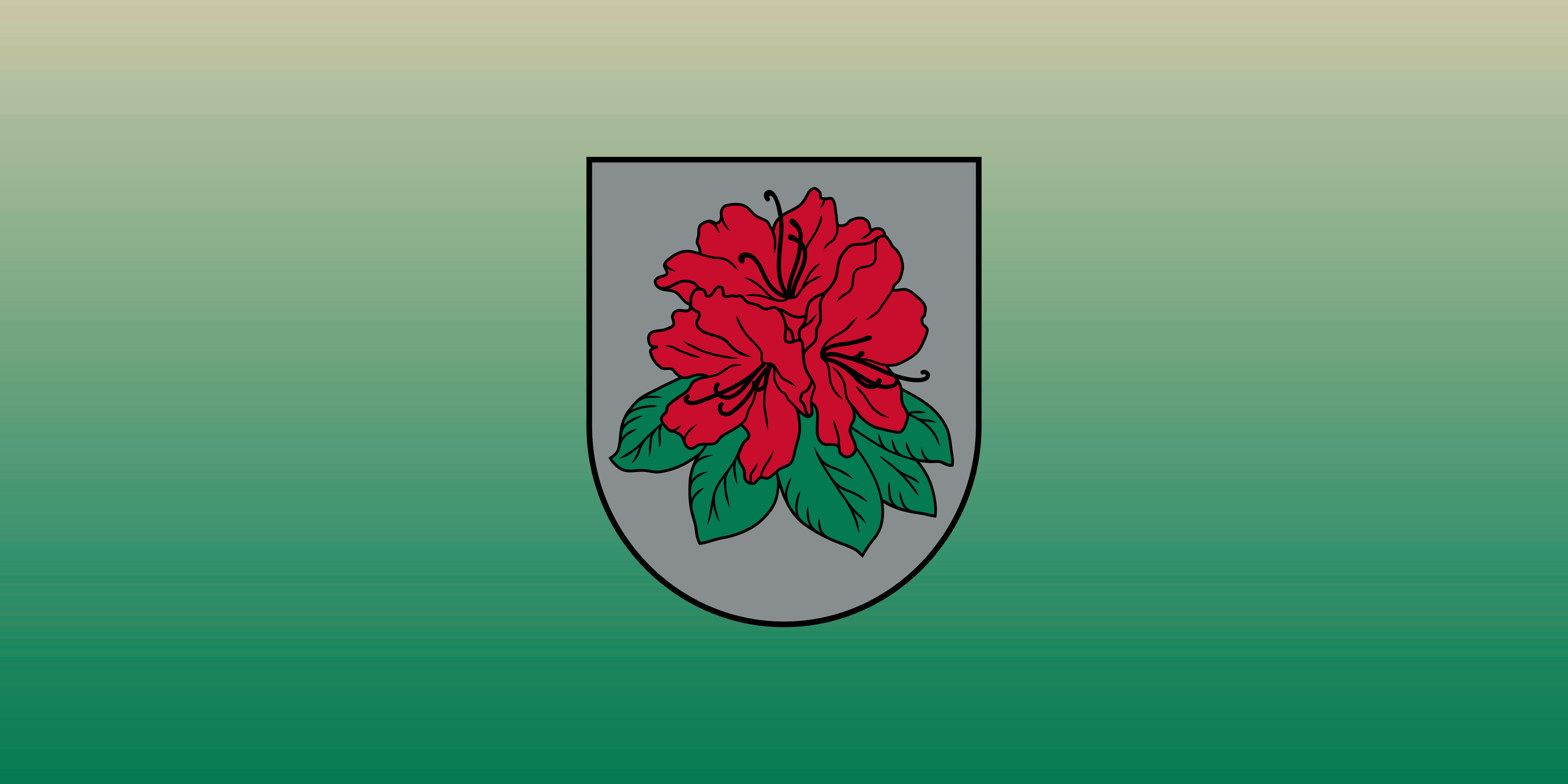
- Flag Coat of arms

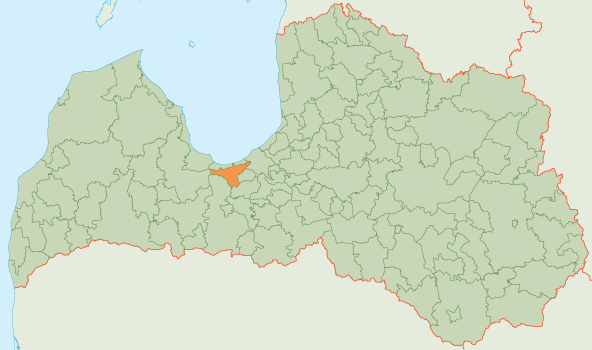
- Country: Latvia
- Established: 2009
- Dissolved: 2021
- Centre: Piņķi

Government
  - Council Chairman (last): Aivars Osītis (LRA)

Area
  - Total: 243.42 km^{2} (93.98 sq mi)
  - Land: 204.77 km^{2} (79.06 sq mi)
  - Water: 38.65 km^{2} (14.92 sq mi)

Population (2021)
  - Total: 11,247
  - Density: 54.925/km^{2} (142.26/sq mi)
- Website: www.babite.lv

Babīte Municipality (Latvian: Babītes novads) was a municipality in Latvia. The municipality was formed in 2009 when Babīte Parish and Sala Parish of the dissolved Riga district were merged. The administrative centre was Piņķi.

On 1 July 2021, Babīte Municipality ceased to exist and its territory was merged into Mārupe Municipality.

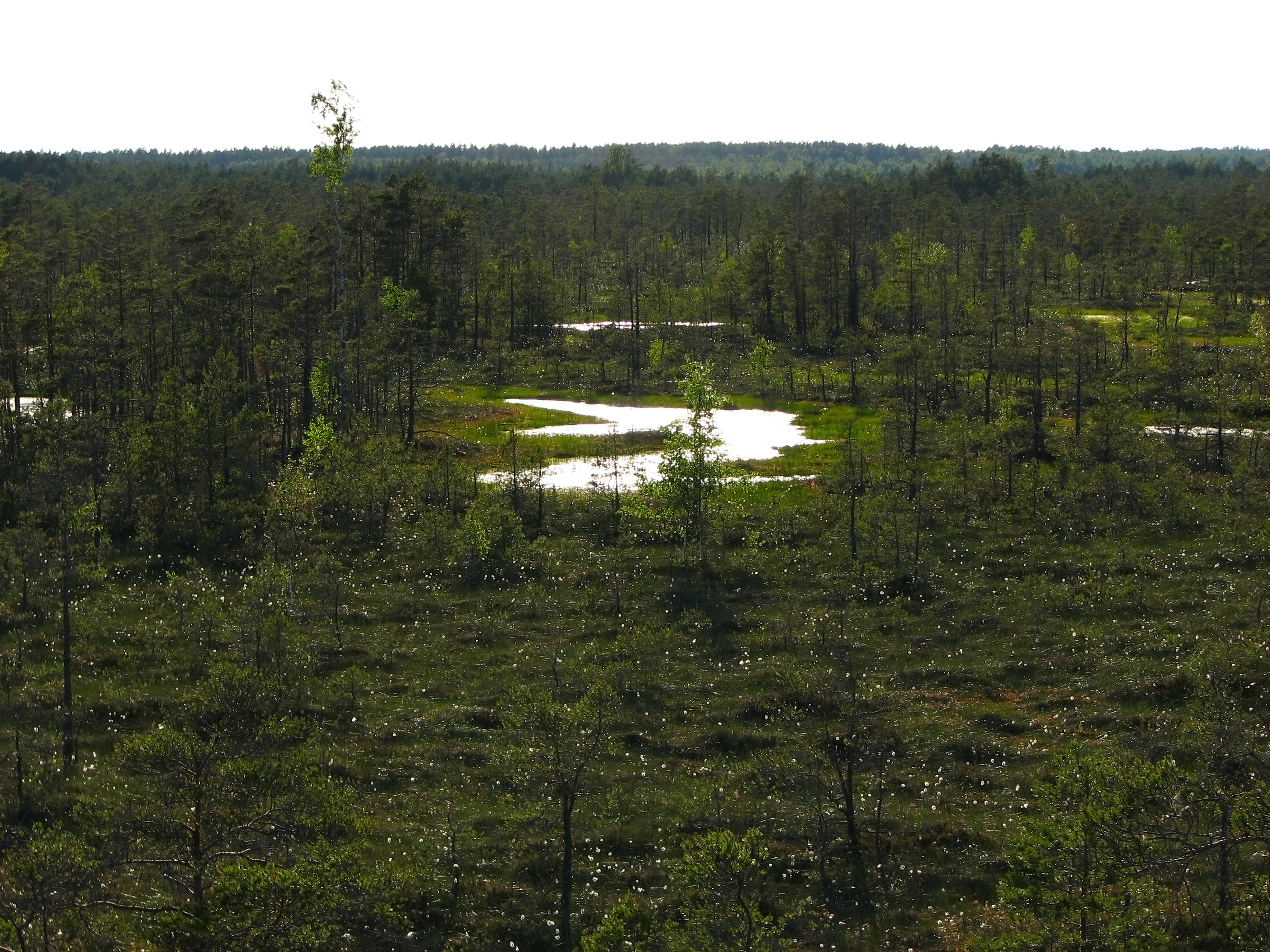
Large bog Cenas Tīrelis in Babīte Municipality

== See also ==
- Administrative divisions of Latvia (2009)
