= P133 (Latvia) =

Regional road in Latvia

- Lidostas "Rīga" pievedceļš

Route information
- Length: 1.8 km (1.1 mi)

Major junctions
- North-east end: A10 / Jūrkalnes iela in Riga
- Ziemeļu iela / Dzirnieku iela
- South-west end: Riga International Airport

Location
- Country: Latvia

Highway system
- National Roads in Latvia

The P133 is a regional road in Latvia. It is officially named Lidostas "Rīga" pievedceļš and forms the principal road approach from the A10 and Jūrkalnes iela in Riga toward Riga International Airport. The road has a total length of 1.8 km (1.1 mi), of which 0.9 km (0.56 mi) is a municipal-owned section in Riga and 0.9 km (0.56 mi) is a state-owned section outside the city.

The P133 is one of the shortest regional roads in Latvia, and it links the national road network and European route E22 corridor with Latvia's largest airport. The official road list also marks parts of the route as belonging to the TEN-T network and the Riga urban node.

== Route description ==
The P133 starts in western Riga, where the municipal section follows Jūrkalnes iela and connects with Kārļa Ulmaņa gatve, which carries the A10 and European route E22. From there, the route runs south-west toward the airport area, crossing from Riga into Mārupe Municipality.

The road provides access to Riga International Airport, nearby airport-related business and logistics areas, and the access-road system around the airport terminal. The P133 intersects Ziemeļu iela and Dzirnieku iela near the airport access area. Since 2022, the last section of road access to the airport terminal has been reorganised in connection with the Rail Baltica airport station works, with traffic from the P133 junction redirected onto a newly built access road known as L1.

The route is paved with asphalt concrete. The section from Kalnciema iela to Riga Airport was described in strategic noise-mapping documentation as having two carriageways, two lanes and a central divider. Speed limits are lower near the airport terminal and access-road system; the new L1 access road was introduced with a 50 km/h (31 mph) limit, while the immediate airport area retained a 30 km/h (19 mph) speed-restriction zone.

== History and construction ==
The airport access road was included in an early-2000s project to improve Latvia's connections to Via Baltica and the main road network before Latvia's accession to the European Union. In 2001, a financing memorandum between Latvia and the European Commission provided ISPA support for the project titled Improvements of links to Via Baltica (Airport Access Road (P133) and a related section on A10). The project was classified under transport road corridor I and located in the Riga district.

The memorandum set the maximum public or equivalent expenditure for the measure at €5.7925 million, with the ISPA contribution fixed at up to €4.344375 million, or 75% of eligible expenditure. Payments for the works were to be completed by 31 December 2003. The project linked the airport access road with improvements to the related A10 section, strengthening the road connection between Riga Airport, the Riga–Jūrmala–Ventspils corridor and the wider Via Baltica network.

== Later improvements ==
In 2020, Latvijas Valsts ceļi resumed works at the P133 junction with Ziemeļu iela and Dzirnieku iela. The safety-improvement project added a turning lane on Dzirnieku iela and a turning lane on the airport access road in the direction of Riga. The works were carried out by SIA Binders for €366,500, including VAT, with financing from the Latvian state budget, Mārupe Municipality and Riga Airport.

The P133 corridor has also been affected by the construction of the Rail Baltica international station and related infrastructure at Riga Airport. In 2021, the Rail Baltica project announced construction of a new approximately 2 km (1.2 mi) access road near the airport, starting from the P133 and Ziemeļu iela junction and leading toward the airport terminal. The new road was intended to replace the previous approach during construction and to provide access to the airport both during and after the Rail Baltica works.

On 15 November 2022, traffic to and from Riga Airport was switched from the former terminal approach on P133 to the newly built L1 road near the future Rail Baltica station building. The change required drivers from Riga to turn diagonally right at the regulated P133 junction with Ziemeļu iela and Dzirnieku iela, then continue along the new 840 m (2,760 ft) road section to the airport access area.

== Rail Baltica and future access roads ==
The future role of the P133 is closely linked to the Rail Baltica station and airport-access-road system. The Rail Baltica airport station project includes a new railway station, elevated railway infrastructure, access roads and parking areas near Riga Airport. The works are planned in stages in order to maintain airport operations and road access during construction.

Rail Baltica project information from 2023 stated that, after completion of the airport station and related infrastructure, access between Riga city centre and the airport would be organised through two new roads, creating a circular traffic pattern in both directions. By 2024, EDZL reported that major underground utility, access-road and parking-area reconstruction had already been carried out as part of the Riga Airport station works.

== Traffic and environmental noise ==
A 2022 strategic noise-mapping summary prepared for Latvijas Valsts ceļi described the P133 section from Kalnciema iela to Riga Airport as carrying more than 10.7 million vehicles annually in 2019. The table in the report gives 10,720,415 vehicles for the year, corresponding to an average of about 29,371 vehicles per day.

The same study found that the surroundings of the P133 section included business, service and light-industrial areas. It reported that no areas near the P133 section exceeded the applicable noise limit values and that there were no educational or inpatient medical-care institutions located in areas where noise levels exceeded the limits.

== Major intersections ==
Road or street	Location or connection
A 10 / Kārļa Ulmaņa gatve	Connection toward central Riga, Jūrmala, Tukums and Ventspils
Jūrkalnes iela	Municipal section of the P133 in Riga
Ziemeļu iela / Dzirnieku iela	Airport access junction; connection to the L1 road and the Riga Airport access-road system
Riga Airport terminal access	Access to Riga International Airport

== Settlements and areas served ==
- Riga
- Mārupe Municipality
- Riga International Airport

== See also ==
- Transport in Latvia
- List of National Roads in Latvia
- Riga International Airport
- A10 road (Latvia)
- Rail Baltica
