= SmartLynx Airlines =

Latvia-based airline

IATA	ICAO	Call sign
6Y	LYX	SMARTLYNX MALTA CAT
- Founded: 1992; 34 years ago (as LatCharter)
- Commenced operations: 1993; 33 years ago
- Ceased operations: 24 November 2025
- Operating bases: Malta; Riga; Tallinn
- Subsidiaries: SmartLynx Airlines Estonia SmartLynx Airlines Malta
- Fleet size: 57
- Destinations: 82
- Headquarters: Mazrūdas, Mārupes novads, Latvia
- Key people: Edvinas Demenius (CEO)
- Employees: 400+
- Website: smartlynx.aero

SmartLynx Airlines Limited, previously LatCharter, was a Latvia-based ACMI, charter and cargo airline headquartered in Mārupe. It operated flights on wet lease (ACMI), holiday charters, ad-hoc passenger charters and cargo flights across Europe, Africa, Asia, Australia, Canada and the United States.

== History ==
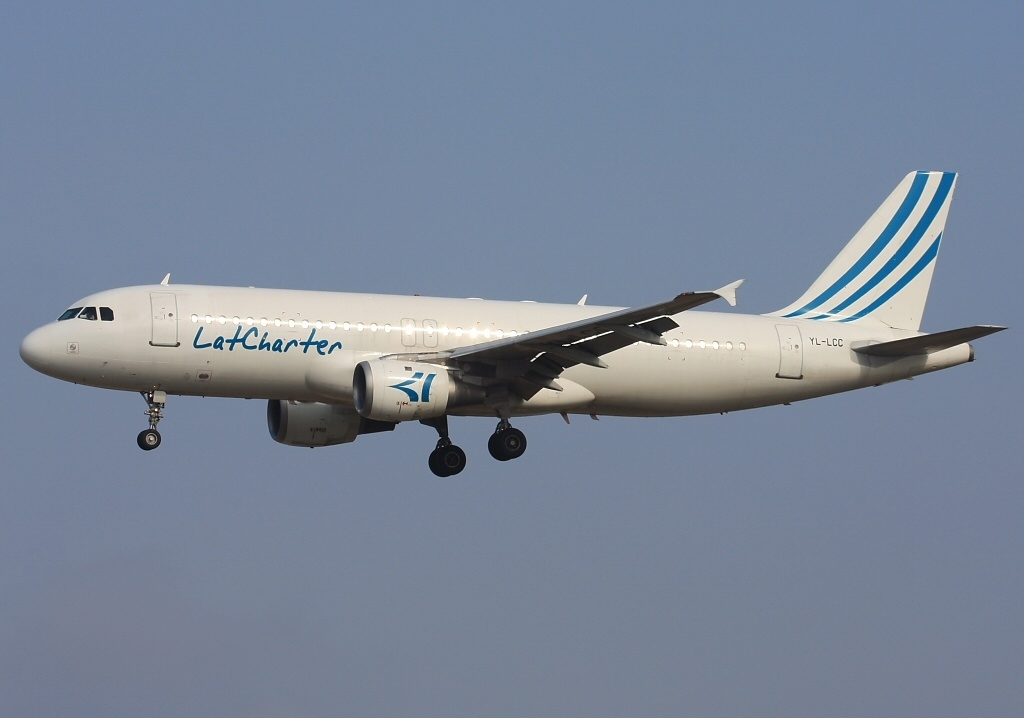
A former LatCharter Airbus A320-200

The privately owned company started operations in 1993 with a leased Tupolev Tu-134B. In 2001, the Tupolev fleet was replaced with the larger Yakovlev Yak-42 and in 2003, first Airbus A320-200 was inducted into the service on behalf of the airline.

In 2006, Loftleiðir, the aircraft lease arm of Icelandair Group, acquired a majority 55% shareholding in the LatCharter stock, and eventually the whole company.

In 2007, the airline expanded its fleet by adding five more A320-200s and two 767-300s. The aircraft were wet-leased to different airlines around the world. Since then, the ACMI market has been the company's primary focus, having operated for numerous carriers such as Air Malta, SBA Airlines, Finnair, Condor. In 2008, the company was renamed SmartLynx Airlines.

In 2012, the airline was bought from Icelandair in a management buy-out also forming a single aircraft subsidiary Smartlynx Airlines Estonia to serve Estonian tour operators. In 2014, SmartLynx transitioned into a paperless cockpit environment by using the Jeppesen FliteDeck Pro app as its electronic flight bag (EFB).

In 2016, the company was bought by a Netherlands-based investment fund.

In June 2016, Zygimantas Surintas was appointed as the company's CEO.

In 2019, the airline established a subsidiary in Malta (SmartLynx Malta). SmartLynx Airlines also became a part of Avia Solutions Group in 2019.

In 2020, the airline expanded into air cargo transportation. In February 2021, SmartLynx and DHL signed a partnership agreement. The partnership included two of SmartLynx Malta A321-200s transporting freight and goods on behalf of the Deutsche Post subsidiary.

In October 2021, SmartLynx announced the establishment of an in-house line maintenance centre, SmartLynx Technik. SmartLynx also leased several Airbus A320 aircraft to Nigerian airline Air Peace in November 2021. In December 2021, the airlines announced plans to open a new office in Vilnius, Lithuania.

In February 2022, SmartLynx Airlines signed an agreement with SMBC Aviation Capital to lease the first two Boeing 737 MAX 8 aircraft. In March 2022, SmartLynx announced the introduction of first Airbus A330-300 freighters to its fleet after signing an agreement with Air Transport Services Group.

SmartLynx also formed partnerships with airlines such as the British airline EasyJet, leasing several aircraft to EasyJet in June 2022. In October 2022, SmartLynx also announced it was adding four Airbus A321F freighters to its fleet, with plans to have 20 A321F aircraft by the end of 2023. The four new aircraft were acquired through a freighter conversion programme in partnership with Aero Capital Solutions.

In 2022, SmartLynx Airlines celebrated its 30th anniversary.

In October 2025, Avia Solutions Group sold SmartLynx to a Dutch fund. Its subsidiaries, SmartLynx Airlines Malta and SmartLynx Airlines Estonia, were not part of the sale and are slated to be rebranded under a single carrier, while SmartLynx was to continue as an independent firm.

On 24 November 2025, the airline announced it would cease operations effective immediately due to financial difficulty.

On December 1 2025, another subsidiary of Avia Solutions Group, BBN Airlines Thailand (previously trading as Thai SmartLynx Airlines), commenced ACMI operations with Thai VietJetAir as its first customer.

== Training centre ==
SmartLynx Training Centre is an approved training organization (ATO) in the Baltic States, providing type rating courses for Airbus A320 family and Boeing 737 MAX 8 aircraft.

== Fleet ==
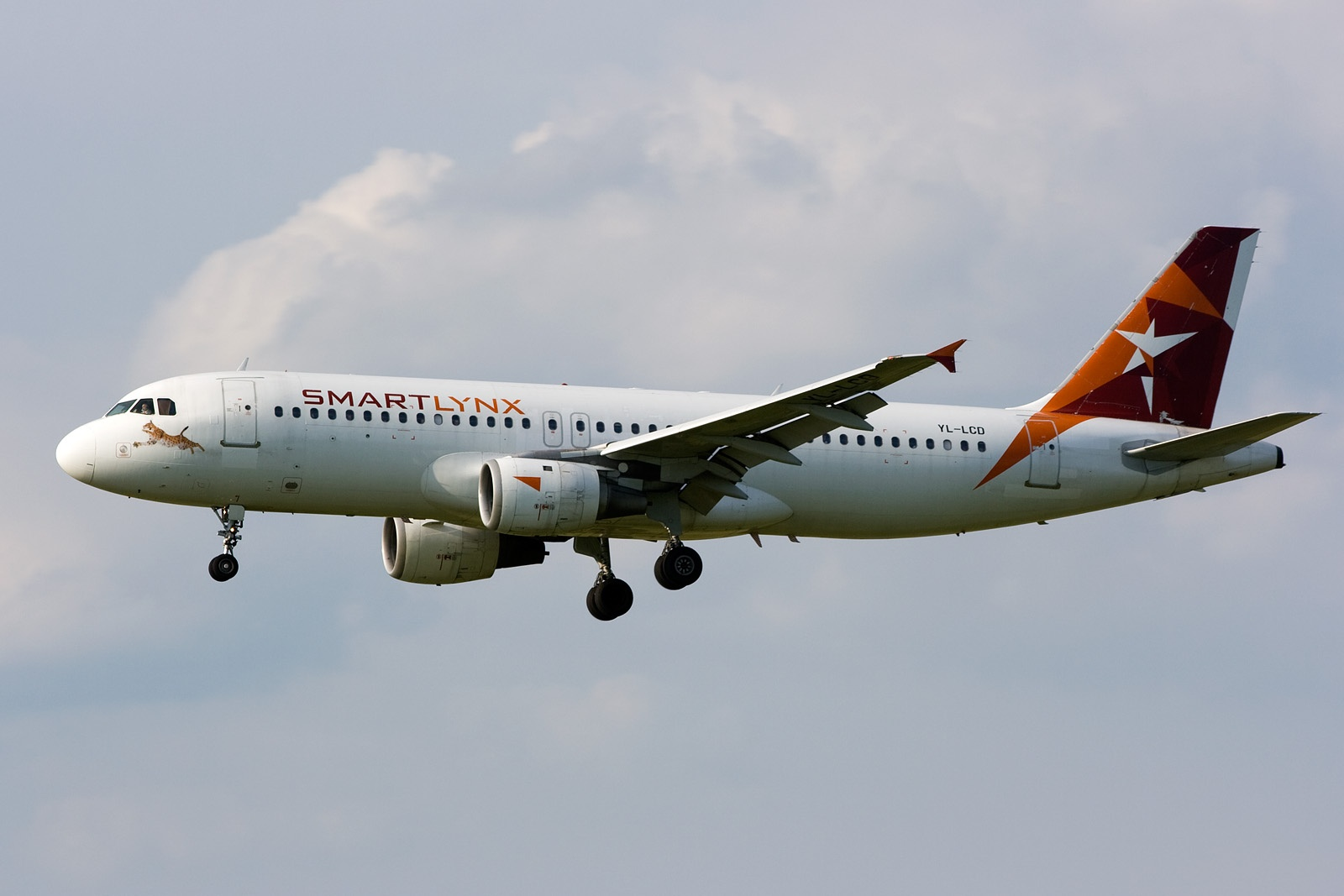
SmartLynx Airlines Airbus A320-200

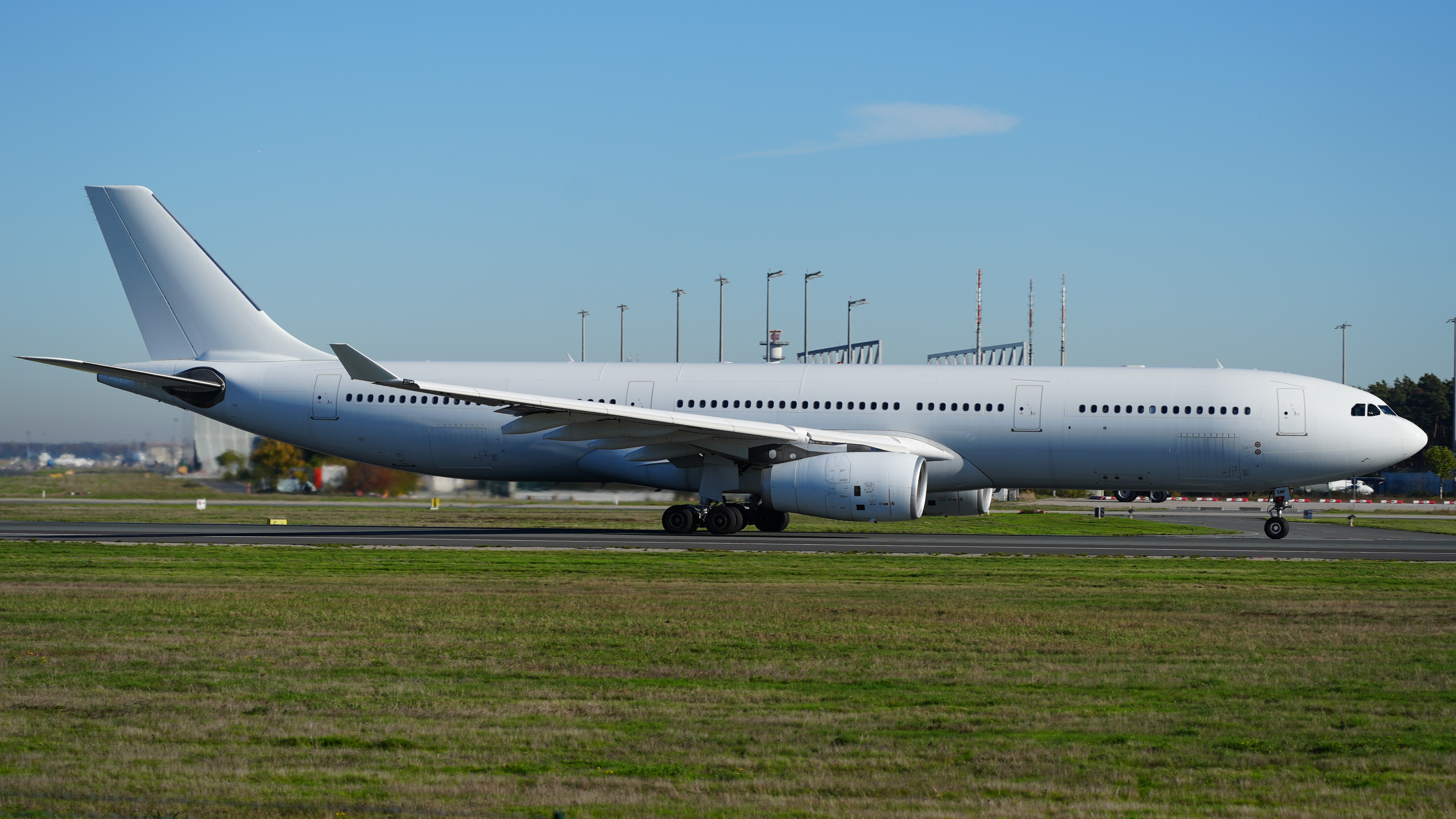
SmartLynx Airlines Airbus A330-300

As of February 2025, the SmartLynx Airlines fleet - including all subsidiaries - consists of the following aircraft:

SmartLynx Airlines fleet
Aircraft	In service	Passengers	Notes
Airbus A320-200	26	180	11 operated by SmartLynx Airlines Ltd. 8 operated by SmartLynx Airlines Estonia. 7 operated by SmartLynx Airlines Malta.
Airbus A321-200	8	220	5 operated by SmartLynx Airlines Ltd. 3 operated by SmartLynx Airlines Malta.
Airbus A321-200P2F	10	Cargo	1 operated by SmartLynx Airlines Ltd. 9 operated by SmartLynx Airlines Malta.
Airbus A330-300	1	436	Operated by SmartLynx Airlines Malta.
Boeing 737 MAX 8	12	189	Operated by SmartLynx Airlines Malta.
Total	57		

== Accidents ==
- On 28 February 2018, a Smartlynx Airlines Airbus A320-214 made an emergency landing at Tallinn Airport, landing 150 meters from the runway during a touch-and-go landing exercise. After a successful runway approach, the aircraft was unable to regain altitude and collided with the runway. During the collision, the aircraft's engines touched the runway, and the covering flaps of the aircraft's main landing gear fell apart. The aircraft managed to regain altitude after the collision and turn back to make a landing, but after the turn both engines stopped. The pilot made an emergency landing about 150 meters from the runway, stopping at about 15 meters south of the runway. All of the aircraft's tires broke in the course of the training. The instructor and one of the students sustained mild injuries as a result of the accident.

== See also ==
- List of airlines of Latvia
