= Ecolines =

European bus service

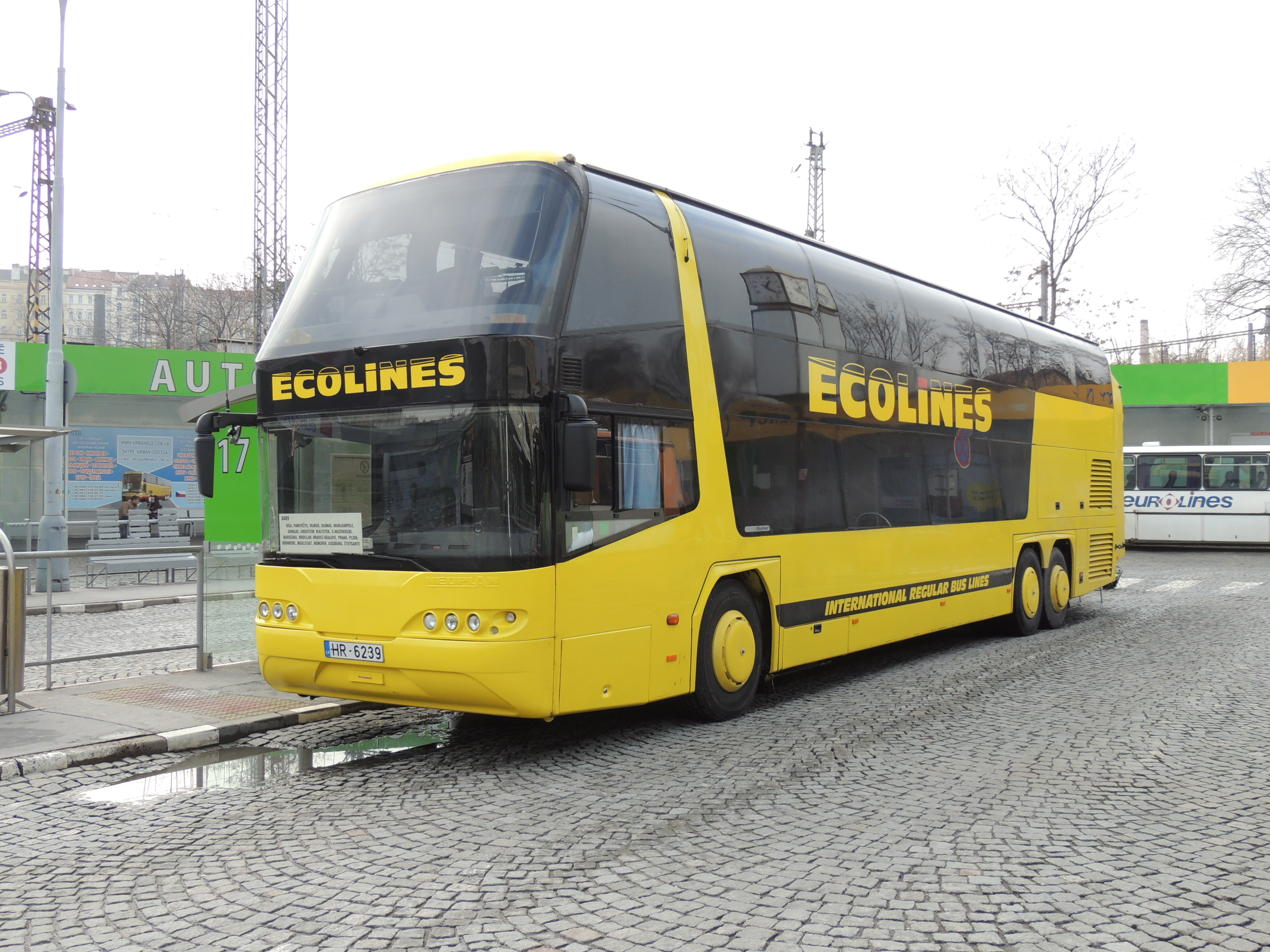
- A Neoplan Skyliner Ecolines coach at Florenc Central Bus Station in Prague
- Founded: 1993; 33 years ago
- Headquarters: Riga, Latvia
- Service area: Europe
- Service type: Intercity bus service
- Stops: 205 in 20 countries
- Hubs: Riga International Coach Terminal
- Fleet: Over 200 buses
- Operator: 12 coach companies
- Website: ecolines.net

Ecolines is a brand of intercity bus service in Central and Eastern Europe, with operations by several carriers. Ecolines has a fleet of over 200 buses, with international routes primarily served by single-and double-decker coaches manufactured by MAN Truck & Bus, Neoplan and Setra.

== History ==
Ecolines was founded in Latvia in 1993 as Norma-A to provide bus services after the dissolution of the Soviet Union.

In 2017, Norma-A, the operator of Ecolines-branded buses in Latvia, acquired 10 new buses for €4 million.

== Safety incidents ==
- In December 2004, on New Year's Eve, an Ecolines bus traveling from Moscow to Riga slid off an icy road in the Jēkabpils district and flipped over, killing nine passengers.
- In September 2013, an Ecolines bus traveling between Moscow and Riga crashed into another bus in Russia, killing nine people.
- In August 2018, an Ecolines bus crashed in Belarus after the driver fell asleep at the wheel; there were no injuries.
- In December 2019, an Ecolines bus traveling from St. Petersburg to Riga went off road, injuring nine people.
- In August 2024, 26 people were injured when a bus crashed in Lithuania.
- In February 2025, one person died when a bus crashed with a car in Poland.

== Operating companies ==
- Amron (Russia)
- Avtobus-Tur (Belarus)
- Ecolines Estonia (Estonia)
- Norma-A (Latvia)
- TRANSINESTA (Lithuania)
- AutoLux (Ukraine)
