= SmartLynx Airlines Estonia =

Estonian airline

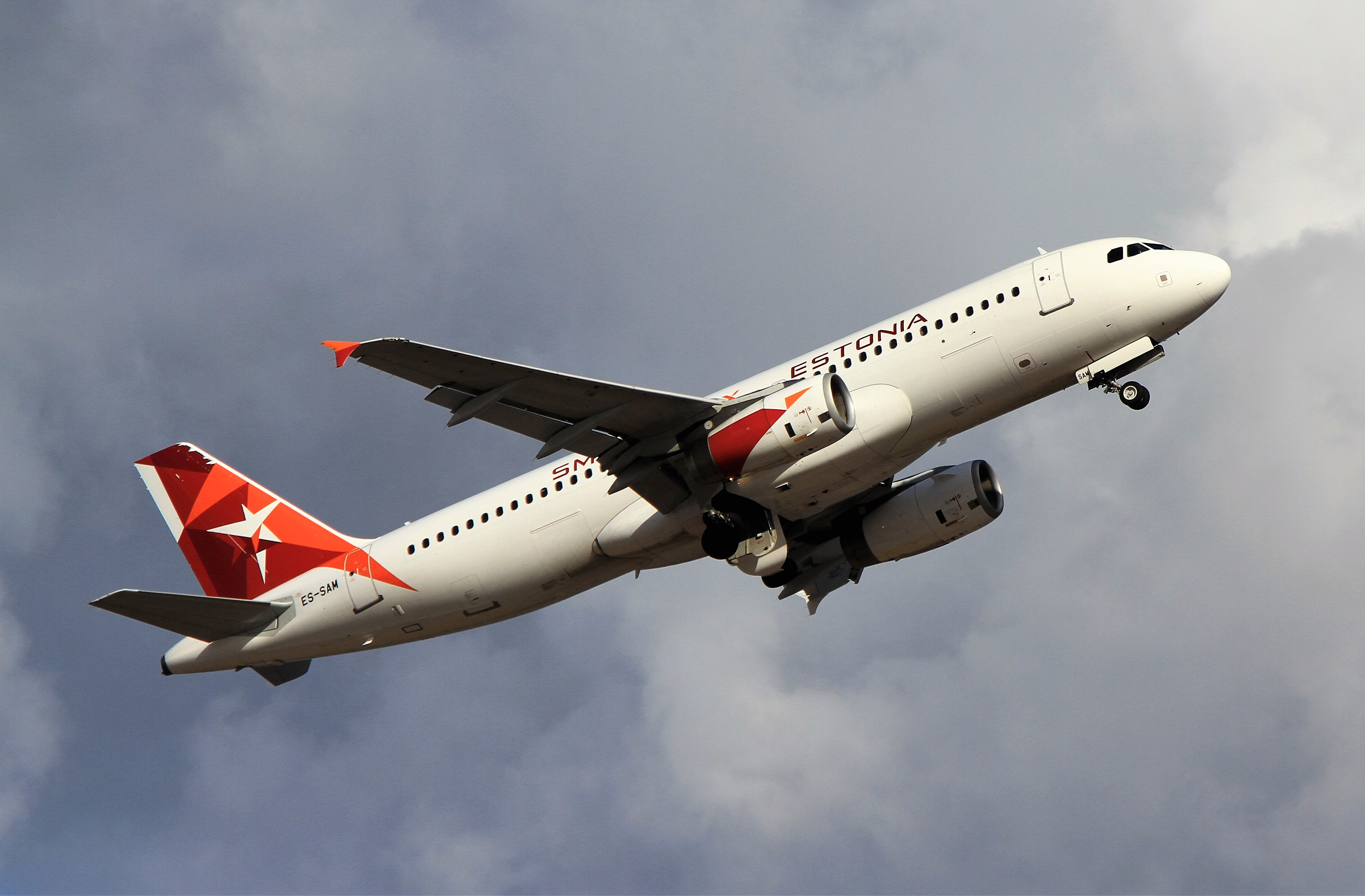
- Airbus A320-200
IATA	ICAO	Call sign
-	MYX	TALLINN CAT
- Founded: 2012; 14 years ago
- Commenced operations: 2012; 14 years ago
- Ceased operations: November 24, 2025; 10 months ago
- AOC #: EE-015
- Operating bases: Tallinn Airport
- Fleet size: 6
- Parent company: SmartLynx Airlines
- Headquarters: Lennujaama tee 13, Tallinn, Estonia
- Website: www.smartlynx.aero

SmartLynx Airlines Estonia was an Estonian charter airline and a wholly owned subsidiary of the now defunct Latvian carrier SmartLynx Airlines.

== History ==
The airline was established and commenced operations in 2012 with aircraft from its parent company and since then had gradually acquired its own fleet. As of June 2015, the subsidiary employed 40 people.

On 24 November 2025, SmartLynx Airlines Latvia, the parent company of SmartLynx Estonia and SmartLynx Malta, announced that it would cease operations with immediate effect due to financial problems. As all three carriers were owned by Avia Solutions Group at the time of the announcement, the company's initial plan was to divest its shares in SmartLynx Latvia and sell it to the Dutch company Break Point Distressed Asset Management. Both SmartLynx Estonia and SmartLynx Malta would then be combined into a single airline and rebranded. However, on 12 December 2025, it was reported that Avia Solutions Group had decided to divest entirely from the Estonian and Maltese subsidiaries, selling them to the same Dutch asset management firm alongside with parent SmartLynx Latvia. The group's decision effectively halted the operations of SmartLynx Estonia and SmartLynx Malta indefinitely and compromised any possibility of recovery.

== Fleet ==
As of July 2025, SmartLynx Airlines Estonia's fleet consists of the following aircraft:

SmartLynx Airlines Estonia fleet
Aircraft	In service	Orders	Passengers	Notes
Airbus A320-200	6	—	180	
Total	6	—		

== Accidents and incidents ==
=== SmartLynx Estonia Flight 9001 ===
On 28 February 2018, a SmartLynx Estonia Airbus A320-214 (registered ES-SAN) whilst operating for SmartLynx Estonia Flight 9001, was a training flight for four new student pilots. Aboard the flight was also an instructor, a second pilot and an Estonian Civil Aviation Administration inspector. The flight had to do five touch-and-go landing cycles and two full-stop landings for each student. While one of the student pilots was controlling the aircraft during takeoff, they lifted the side-stick back; however, the aircraft ceased to respond. It soon gained altitude but thereafter rapidly lost elevation, and engine 2 hit the runway and again gained altitude and climbed to 1590 ft, and subsequently pitched down again. The aircraft also was not responding to several flight inputs. Pilots used manual pitch trim and engine thrust to stabilize the flight path and make a turn back to the runway. Shortly after, engine 2 flamed out and failed; and, during final approach, engine 1 also flamed out and failed. The safety pilot recognized the problem in time, and the instructor took control from the trainee. The aircraft touched down hard 150 metres (490 ft) from the runway. No one aboard was killed; however, there was severe damage to the aircraft, and it was subsequently written off.

Investigation later found that the accident was caused by a combination of factors which contributed to the accident.

- A part of the plane that helps control its movement (THSA) was not working properly because of the wrong oil used. This caused a loss of control by the plane's elevator and aileron computers (ELACs). The plane's maintenance did not include a check of a safety device (OVM), which might have let this problem go unnoticed.
- There was a design issue in another computer (SEC) which caused a loss of control when there was a temporary issue with the left landing gear. Not having ground spoilers ready for landing during training may have contributed to this problem.
- The training instructor decided to keep flying despite the repetitive warning messages from the ELAC. There were not clear rules for training flights and there was pressure to finish the training.
