= Latavio =

Latvian airline

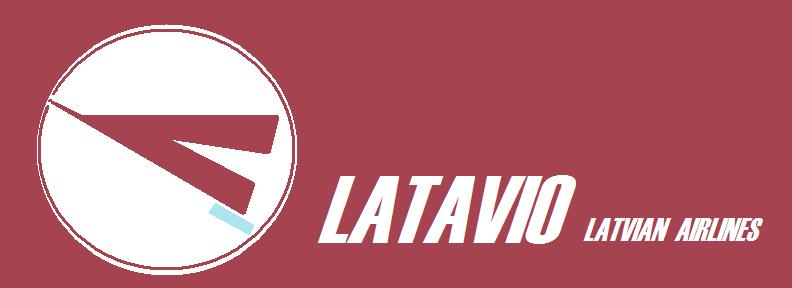

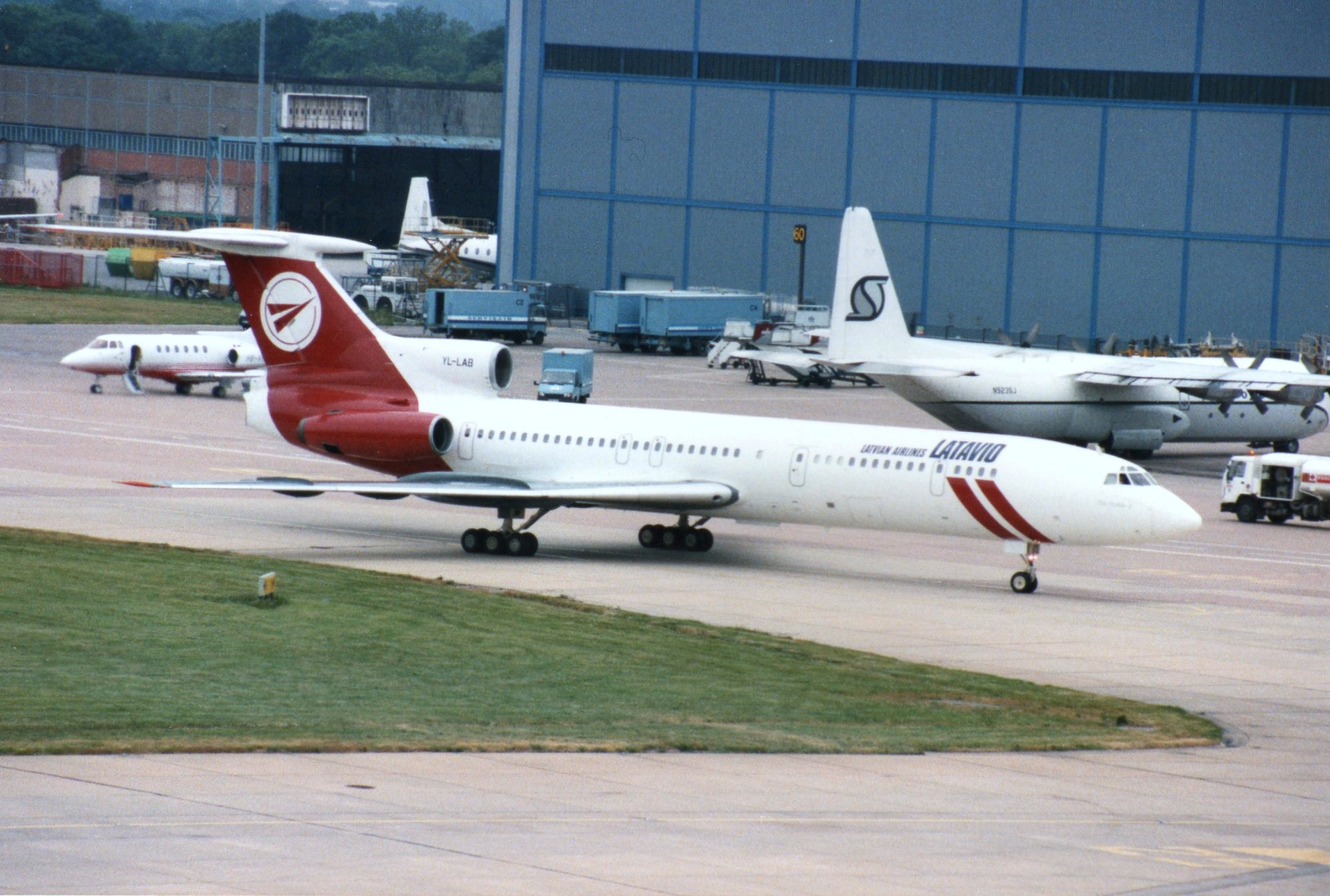
IATA	ICAO	Call sign
PV	LTL	LATAVIO
- Founded: 1992
- Ceased operations: 1996
- Hubs: Riga International Airport

Latavio (Latvian Airlines) was an airline based in Riga International Airport (RIX), Riga, Latvia. It was founded in 1992, after emerging from Aeroflot. The fleet generally consisted of Soviet-made Aeroflot airplanes. AirBaltic replaced it as the Latvian flag carrier.

== History ==
Latavio, the local Latvian branch of Aeroflot, provided air transportation during the time when Latvia was a part of Soviet Union. After the dissolution of Soviet Union in 1991 Latavio become a separate company. Latavio had 22 jet aircraft and 14 turboprops, according to Flight International. It employed about 550 people in 1995.

Latavio was eventually shut down after a failed privatization attempt in late 1995.

== Fleet ==
Latavio fleet consisted of Tupolev TU-154B-2; Tupolev TU-134B-3; Antonov AN-24B and Antonov AN-12. Latavio Antonov AN-24B can still be seen in aviation museum in Riga International Airport.
