= Mārupe =

Town and capital of Mārupe Municipality, Latvia

- Town
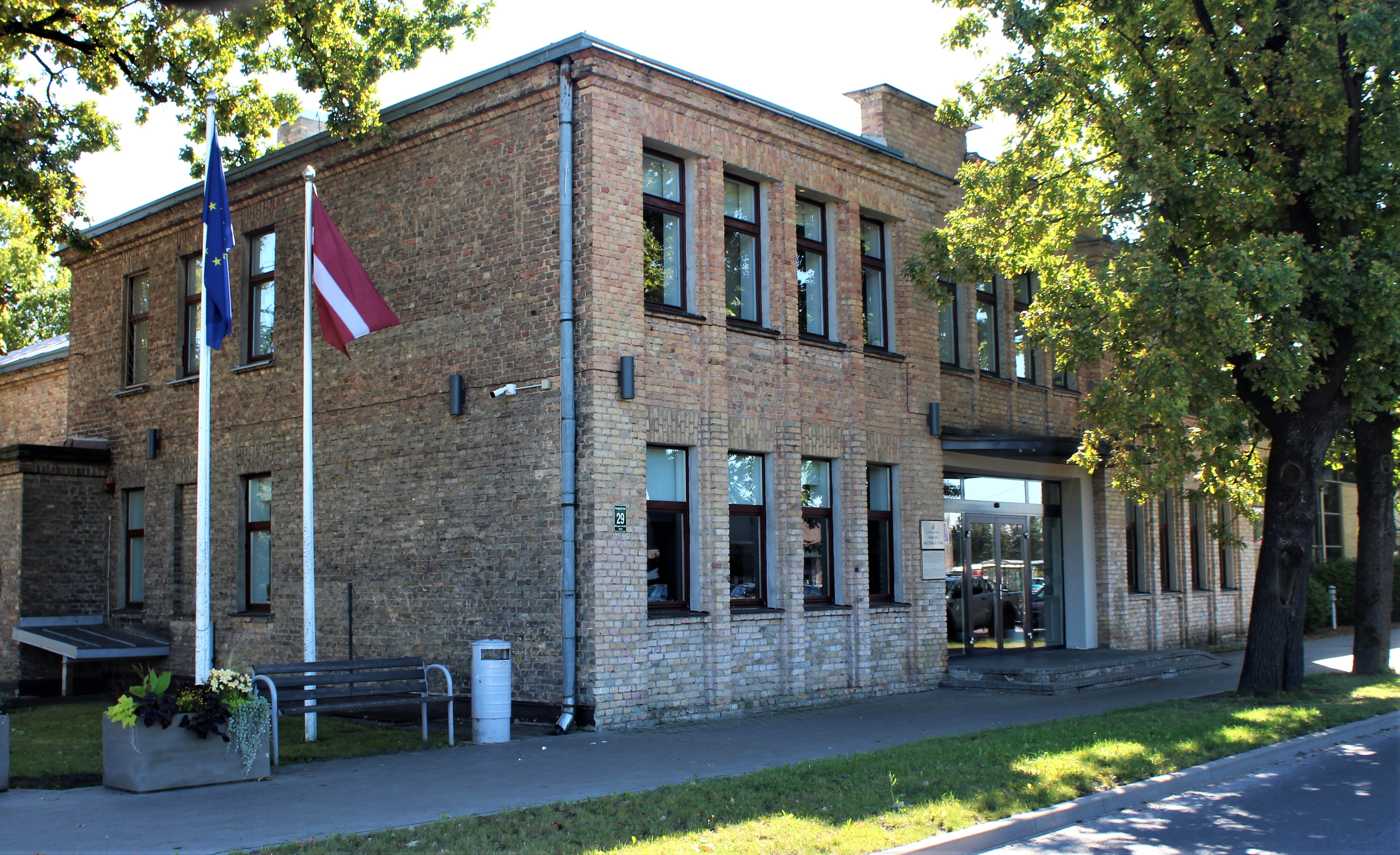
- Town hall and centre of Mārupe

- Flag Coat of arms

- Mārupe's location in Latvia
- Coordinates: 56°54′24.76″N 24°3′30.01″E
- Country: Latvia
- Municipality: Mārupe
- City rights: 2022

Area
  - Total: 7.9 sq mi (20.5 km^{2})

Population (2021)
  - Total: 19,096
  - Density: 2,410/sq mi (932/km^{2})

Mārupe (Latvian pronunciation: [ˈmaːrupɛ]) is a town and the administrative centre of Mārupe Municipality in the Vidzeme region of Latvia. The town is a suburb of Riga, the capital of Latvia. Mārupe borders the Zemgale Suburb of Riga to its east and northeast.

Riga International Airport is located just outside the town's boundary to the northwest.

According to the provisions of the 2021 Latvian administrative reform, Mārupe gained city rights (town status) on 1 July 2022.

== Etymology ==
The name Mārupe means "Mara's river" in Latvian and is derived from the name of the Mārupīte river (upīte meaning a small river, or a stream), a left tributary of the Daugava which flows through the town. The river was the location of the historic Maras (Mary's) Mills, which initially belonged to the Cathedral chapter of the Riga Cathedral, the full name of which is The Cathedral Church of Saint Mary. The historic German name of the Mārupīte was Marienbach, or Mary's stream.

== Economy ==
The largest businesses registered in Mārupe in 2020 were: road transport company "Kreiss", auto parts retailer "Inter Cars Latvija", computer retailer "Also Latvia", electricals and computers vendor "MoonCom".

=== Roads ===
The main road through Mārupe is Riga-Jaunmārupe (P132). Two big roads are the borders of town: Rīga-Eleja (A8) and Rīga-Ventspils (A10). The center of Riga is 9 km from Mārupe to north-east. Nearest railway passenger station is Tīraine, 2 km to west from center of Mārupe. Trains operated by Vivi through Tīraine to Riga and Jelgava go 26 times daily. Riga city buses, operated by Rīgas Satiksme, also reach Mārupe.

== Sports ==
The town is the home of football team Mārupes SC, which plays in the Latvian First League. The headquarters of the Latvian Bandy Federation are located in Mārupe.
