= Transeast Airlines =

Latvian airline

| IATA | ICAO | Call sign |
|---|---|---|
| T4 | TRL | LATTRANS |
- Founded: 1993
- Ceased operations: 2001
- Hubs: Riga International Airport
- Destinations: 2
- Headquarters: Riga International Airport, Latvia

Transeast Airlines was an airline based in Riga, Latvia. Its main base was Riga International Airport, and it started operating scheduled services between Riga and Jönköping, Sweden in May 1993, and between Riga and Billund, Denmark in March 1995. It ceased its operations in 2001.

== Fleet ==
The Transeast Airlines fleet consisted of Yakovlev Yak-40 aircraft.
