= Sala Parish, Mārupe Municipality =

Parish of Latvia

- parish of Latvia
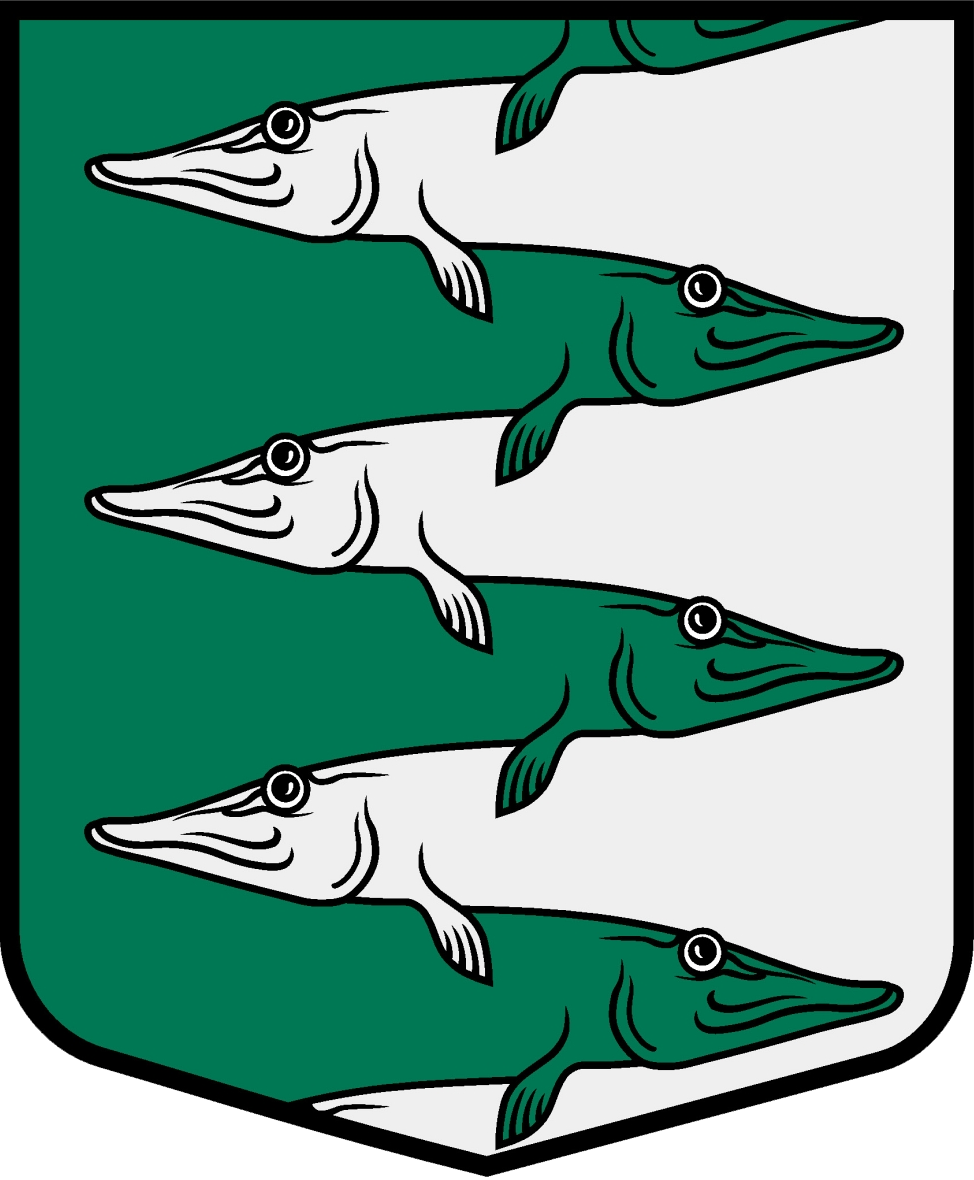
- Coat of arms

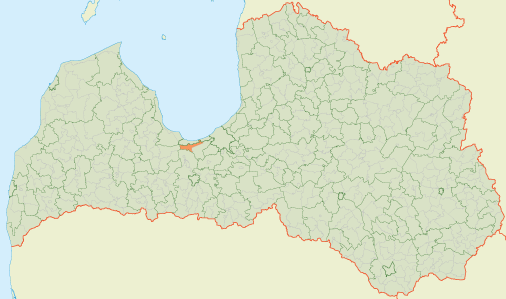
- Coordinates: 56°55′06″N 23°39′13″E
- Country: Latvia

Population (1 January 2026)
  - Total: 1,547

Sala Parish (Latvian: Salas pagasts) is a territorial unit of Mārupe Municipality in Latvia. From 2009 until 2021, it was part of Babīte Municipality, after Babīte parish and Sala parish were merged as part of the municipality. Prior to 2009, it was part of Riga district. Sala Parish is defined by Latvian law as a part of the region of Vidzeme.

== Villages ==
- Spuņciems (parish centre)
- Gātciems
- Kaģi
- Kūdra
- Pavasari
- Pērnciems
- Silmalas
- Sīpolciems
- Straupciems
- Varkaļi
