= Riga International Coach Terminal =

Bus station in Riga, Latvia

Coordinates: 56.945°N 24.114167°E

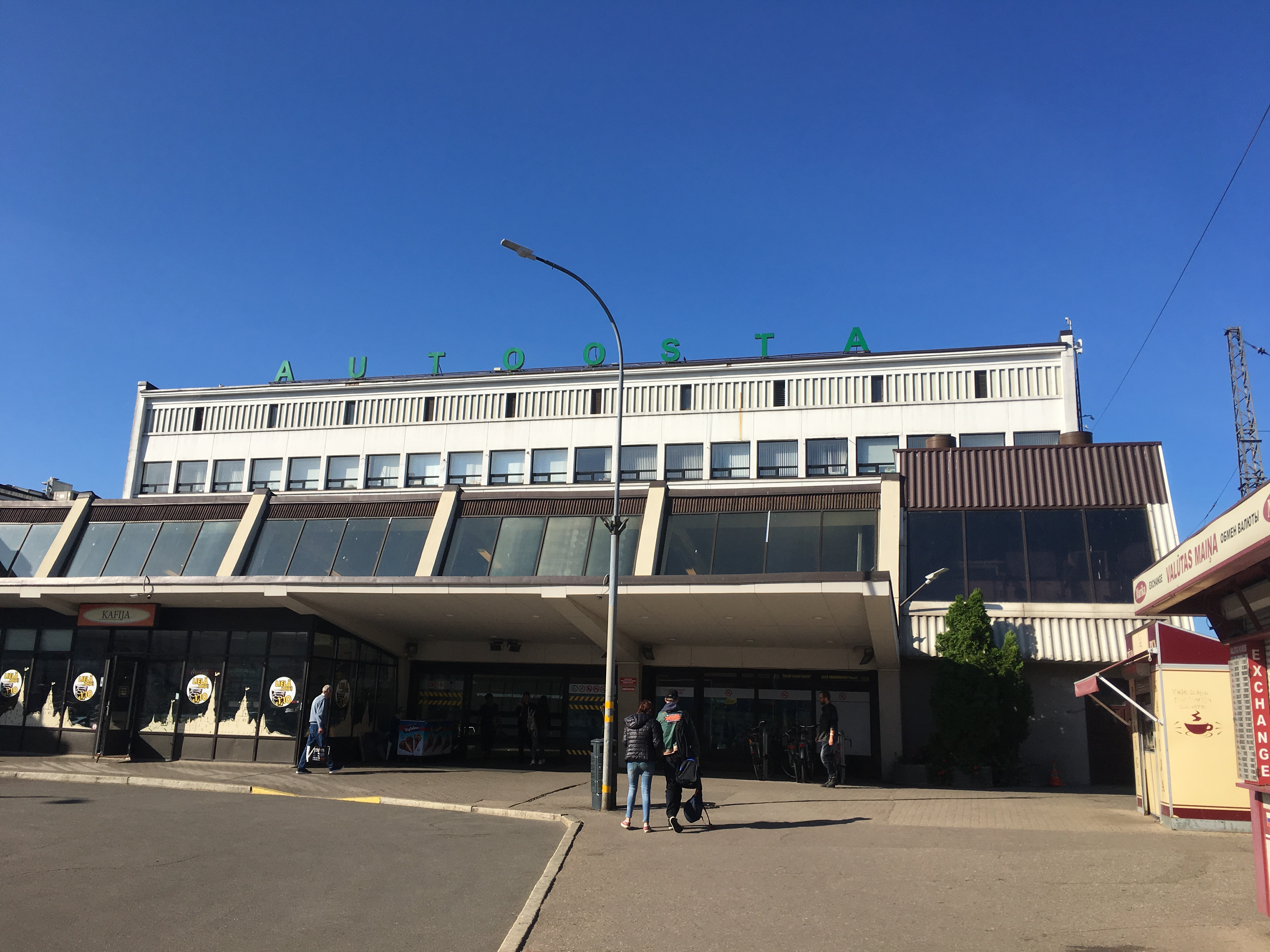
Station building

Riga International Coach Terminal (Latvian: Rīgas Starptautiskā autoosta) is a bus station in Riga, Latvia, for both domestic and international bus lines. The terminal is situated at the address 1 Prāgas iela, right next to Riga Central Market and opposite Riga Central Station. The terminal was built in 1964 and has 33 bays.

== List of bus routes ==
=== International ===
Line	Route	Bus company
8003	Rīga — Salacgrīva — Latvian/Estonian border — Pärnu — Tallinn (Coach Terminal).	Norma-A
8005, 8007	Rīga — Latvian/Estonian border — Pärnu — Tallinn sea terminal — Tallinn (Coach Terminal).	TOKS P UAB
8008	Rīga — (Alfa Shopping mall, Riga) — Pärnu — (Vana-Pääsküla Shopping mall, Tallinn) — Tallinn (Coach Terminal).	EUROLINES, Lux Express Latvia
8199	Rīga — Latvian/Russian border — Pytalovo — Ostrov — Pskov — Utorgosh — Shimsk — Novgorod.	Vissa SIA
8205	Rīga — Aizkraukle — Jēkabpils — Latvian/Russian border — Moscow (Rizhsky Rail Terminal).	Norma-A SIA
82050 on Mondays, Fridays	Rīga — Latvian/Russian border — Sebezh — Pustoshka — Nevel — Usvyaty — Velizh — Smolensk.	Alma LTD SIA
8225 on Saturdays	Rīga — Daugavpils — Latvian/Belarusian border — Belarusian/Ukrainian border — Kyiv — Odesa.	Norma-A SIA
8229 on Fridays	Rīga — Daugavpils — Latvian/Belarusian border — Belarusian/Ukrainian border — Kyiv — Poltava — Dnipro.	Norma-A SIA
8230 on Mondays, Thursdays, Sundays	Rīga — Daugavpils — Latvian/Belarusian border — Belarusian/Ukrainian border — Kyiv.	Norma-A SIA
8232 on Fridays	Rīga — Lviv — Ivano-Frankivsk — Chernivtsi.	OLIMP SIA
8236 on Thursdays	Rīga — Kovel — Lutsk — Dubno — Lviv — Drohobych — Truskavets.	Norma-A SIA
8308	Rīga — Jelgava — Eleja — Latvian/Lithuanian border — Joniškis — Šiauliai — Klaipėda.	Klaipėda AP
8311	Rīga — Latvian/Lithuanian border — Mažeikiai — Plungė — Klaipėda.	Olego transportas SIA
8312	Rīga — Pasvalys — Panevėžys — Kėdainiai — Kaunas.	Kautra AS
8407	Rīga — Olaine — Jelgava — Eleja — Latvian/Lithuanian border — Joniškis — Šiauliai — Kelmė — Kryžkalnis — Tauragė — Sovetsk — Bolshakovo — Gvardeysk — Kaliningrad.	KAVTOK SIA or EUROLINES, Lux Express Latvia
8505	Rīga — Latvian/Lithuanian border — Panevėžys — Vilnius — Lithuanian/Belarusian border — Oshmiany — Minsk.	Nordeka AS or Minskpassaziravtotrans
8507	Riga International Airport — Rīga — Panevėžys — Vilnius.	EUROLINES, Lux Express Latvia
8511	Rīga — Latvian/Lithuanian border–Panevėžys — Fabijoniškes (Vilnius) — Vilnius.	TOKS P UAB
8512	Rīga — Pļaviņas — Daugavpils — Latvian/Belarusian border — Braslaw — Sharkovschina — Glubokoye — Dokshitsi — Begomel — Pleschenitsy — Minsk.	Minskpassaziravtotrans or Daugavpils AP SIA or Nordeka AS
8513 on Sundays	Rīga — Daugavpils — Latvian/Belarusian border — Pastavy — Narach — Maladzyechna — Baranovichi.	OLIMP SIA
8516 on Mondays, Thursdays	Rīga — Daugavpils — Polotsk — Vitebsk — Orsha — Mogilev — Gomel.	OLIMP SIA
8519	Rīga — Jēkabpils — Līvāni — Daugavpils — Krāslava — Latvian/Belarusian border — Verhnedvinsk — Novopolotsk — Polotsk — Vitebsk.	Dautrans SIA
8522 on Mondays, Fridays	Rīga — Vilnius — Šalčininkai — Voranava — Lida — Ščučyn — Skidal — Grodno.	Intaks SIA
8525 on Saturdays	Rīga — Vilnius — Druskininkai.	Norma-A SIA
8573	Rīga — Rēzekne — Ostrov — Pskov — Luga — St.Petersburg (Coach Terminal at the Obvodny Kanal).	Norma - A SIA
8804	Rīga — Valga — Tartu — Jõhvi — Sillamäe — Narva — Ivangorod — Kingisepp — St.Petersburg (Coach Terminal at the Obvodny Kanal).	EUROLINES, Lux Express Latvia
	Riga International Airport — Rīga — Valmiera — Valga — Tartu — Jõhvi — Sillamäe — Narva — Ivangorod — Kingisepp — Baltiysky Rail Terminal, St.Petersburg — St.Petersburg (Coach Terminal at the Obvodny Kanal).	EUROLINES, Lux Express Latvia
8807	Rīga — Kaunas — Warszawa.	EUROLINES, Lux Express Latvia
8660 on Tuesdays	Rīga — Panevėžys — Vilnius — Kaunas — Marijampolė — Suwałki — Augustów — Bialystok — Ostrów Mazowiecka — Warszawa — Hraděc Králové — Prague.	Norma-A
8661 on Fridays	Rīga — Panevėžys — Vilnius — Kaunas — Marijampolė — Suwałki — Augustów — Bialystok — Ostrów Mazowiecka — Warszawa — Częstochowa — Katowice — Kraków — Bratislava — Vienna — Budapest — Sofia.	Norma-A
8697 on Thursdays, Saturdays	Rīga — Panevėžys — Vilnius — Kaunas — Marijampolė — Suwałki — Augustów — Białystok — Ostrów Mazowiecka — Warszawa — Antwerpen — London.	Norma-A
8813	Rīga — Pärnu — Tallinn (Coach Terminal).	HANSABUSS AS
8902	Rīga — Valga — Tartu.	Norma-A SIA
8903 on Saturdays	Rīga — Panevėžys — Vilnius — Kaunas — Marijampolė — Suwałki — Augustów — Białystok — Ostrów Mazowiecka — Warszawa — Berlin — Leipzig — Dresden — Chemnitz — Nürnberg — Munich — Augsburg — Ulm.	Norma-A
8905 on Mondays, Thursdays, Saturdays	Rīga — Panevėžys — Kaunas — Marijampolė — Berlin — Magdeburg — Braunschweig — Hannover — Bielefeld — Kassel — Giesen — Dortmund — Bochum — Essen — Duisburg — Düsseldorf — Köln — Mannheim — Frankfurt am Main — Karlsruhe — Stuttgart.	Kautra AS
on Tuesdays	Rīga — Šiauliai — Kaunas — Marijampolė — Suwałki — Augustów — Białystok — Ostrów Mazowiecka — Warszawa — Berlin-Hannover — Bielefeld — Kassel — Fulda — Frankfurt am Main — Mannheim — Karlsruhe — Stuttgart.	Norma-A
on Thursdays	Rīga — Panevėžys — Vilnius — Kaunas — Marijampolė — Suwałki — Augustów — Białystok — Ostrów Mazowiecka — Warszawa — Berlin — Magdeburg — Braunschweig — Kassel — Frankfurt am Main — Mannheim — Karlsruhe — Stuttgart.	Norma-A
8906 on Mondays, Wednesdays	Rīga — Panevėžys — Vilnius — Kaunas — Marijampolė — Suwałki — Augustów — Białystok — Ostrów Mazowiecka — Warszawa — Berlin — Magdeburg — Braunschweig — Hannover — Bielefeld — Osnabrück — Munster — Dortmund — Essen — Duisburg-Düsseldorf-Koln — Bonn.	Norma-A
on Thursdays, Saturdays	Rīga — Šiauliai — Kaunas — Marijampolė — Suwałki — Augustów — Białystok — Ostrów Mazowiecka — Warszawa — Berlin — Magdeburg — Hannover — Bielefeld — Dortmund — Essen — Duisburg — Düsseldorf — Köln — Bonn.	Norma-A
8908 on Thursdays	Rīga–Panevėžys-Vilnius–Kaunas–Marijampolė–Suwałki — Augustów — Białystok — Ostrów Mazowiecka — Warszawa–Berlin — Leipzig — Dresden — Chemnitz — Nürnberg — Munich — Augsburg — Ulm — St. Gallen — Winterthur — Zürich — Bern.	Norma-A
8910 on Fridays	Rīga — Panevėžys — Vilnius — Kaunas — Marijampolė — Suwałki — Augustów — Białystok — Ostrów Mazowiecka — Warszawa — Częstochowa — Katowice — Kraków.	Norma-A
8921 on Thursdays	Rīga — Šiauliai — Kaunas — Marijampolė — Suwałki — Augustów — Białystok — Ostrów Mazowiecka — Warszawa — Berlin — Hamburg — Bremen — Osnabrück — Munster — Apeldoorn — Arnhem — Utrecht — Amsterdam — Den Haag — Rotterdam.	Norma-A
on Saturdays	Rīga — Panevėžys — Vilnius — Kaunas — Marijampolė — Suwałki — Augustów — Białystok — Ostrów Mazowiecka — Warszawa — Berlin — Hamburg — Bremen — Osnabrück — Münster — Apeldoorn — Arnhem — Utrecht — Amsterdam — Den Haag — Rotterdam.	Norma-A

=== National ===
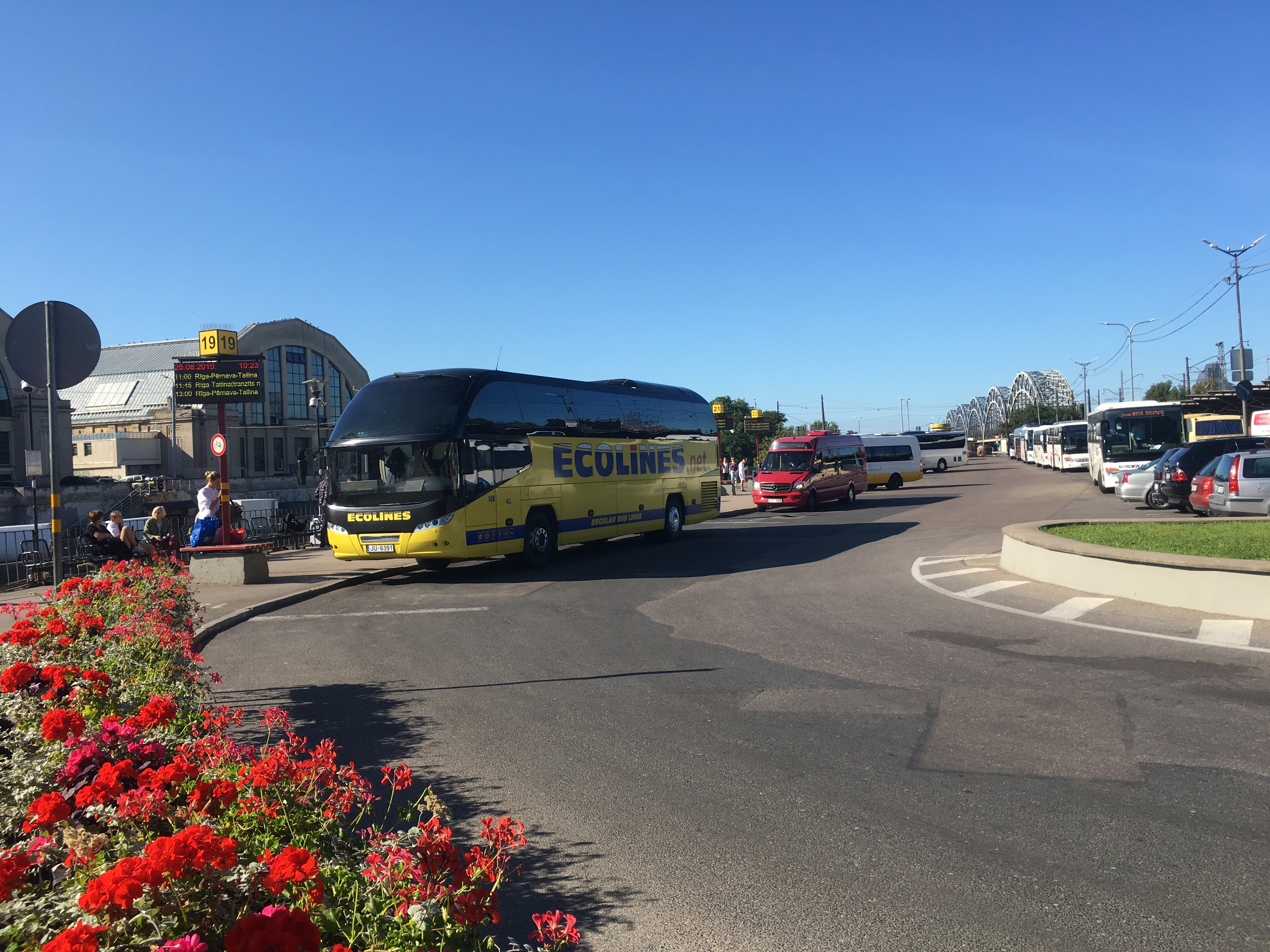
Outdoor bus bays and waiting area
