= Concors =

Latvian charter airline

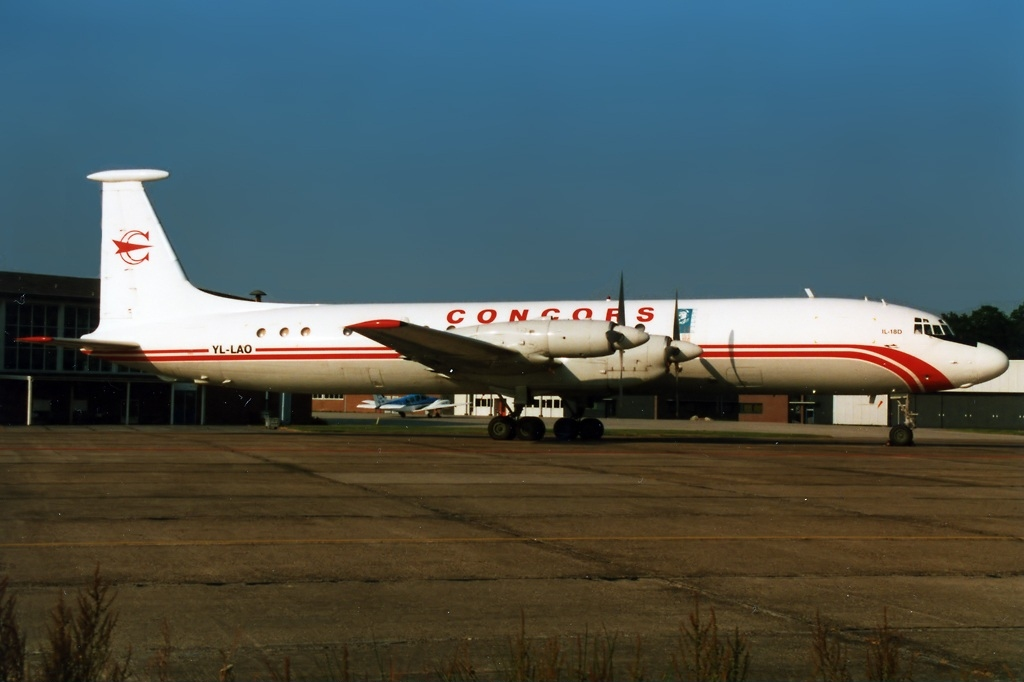
IATA	ICAO	Call sign
-	COS	CONCORS
- Founded: 1991
- Commenced operations: 1995
- Ceased operations: 2005
- Hubs: Riga International Airport
- Fleet size: 1
- Headquarters: Riga, Latvia
- Website: https://web.archive.org/web/20050210023509/http://www.concors.apollo.lv/ defunct

Concors Latvian Air Service was an airline based in Riga, Latvia. Founded in 1991, it operated regional and international charter flights out of Riga International Airport between 1995 and 2005.

== Fleet ==
As of March 2007, the Concors fleet included of only one small aircraft, a Let L-410 UVP.

Previous fleet: 1x Il-18D 1x YAK-42D
