= List of airlines of Latvia =

This is a list of airlines currently operating in Latvia.

== Scheduled airlines ==
Airline	Image	IATA	ICAO	Callsign	Commenced operations	Notes
Air Baltic		BT	BTI	AIR BALTIC	1995	Flag carrier

== Charter airlines ==
Airline	Image	IATA	ICAO	Callsign	Commenced operations	Notes
GetJet Airlines Latvia		GJ	DML	DREAMLAND	2022	Subsidiary of GetJet Airlines

== Cargo airlines ==
Airline	Image	IATA	ICAO	Callsign	Commenced operations	Notes
RAF-Avia			MTL	MITAVIA	1990	

== See also ==
- List of defunct airlines of Latvia
- List of defunct airlines of Europe
- List of airlines
