= Babīte Parish =

Parish of Latvia

- parish of Latvia
- Coat of arms

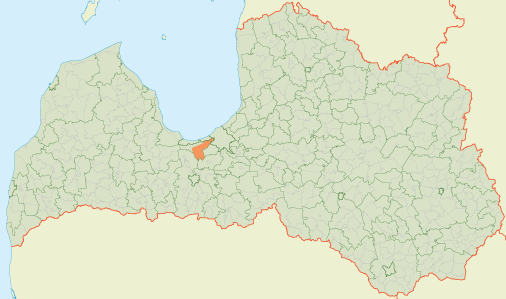
- 56°53′44″N 23°49′04″E
- Country: Latvia

Area
  - Total: 167.19 km^{2} (64.55 sq mi)
  - Land: 148.28 km^{2} (57.25 sq mi)
  - Water: 18.91 km^{2} (7.30 sq mi)

Population (1 January 2024)
  - Total: 11,361
  - Density: 68/km^{2} (180/sq mi)

Babīte Parish (Latvian: Babītes pagasts) is an administrative unit of Mārupe Municipality, Latvia. From 2009 until 2021, it was part of the former Babīte Municipality after Babīte parish was merged with Sala parish. Latvian law defines Babīte Parish as belonging partly to the region of Vidzeme and partly to Semigallia.
