= Mārupe Municipality =

Municipality of Latvia

Coordinates: 56°54′25″N 24°03′30″E

Mārupe Municipality Mārupes novads
- Municipality
- Flag Coat of arms

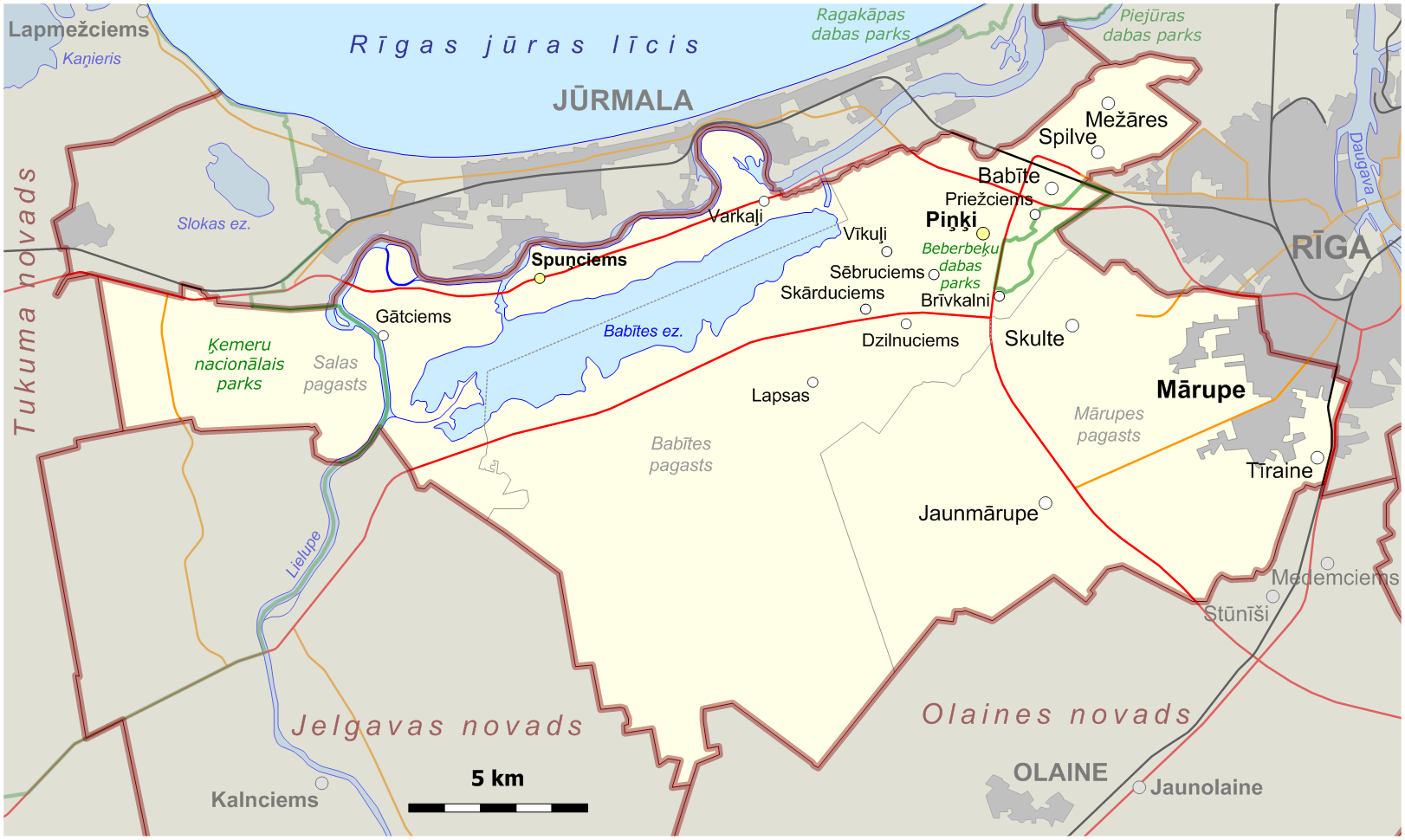
- Country: Latvia
- Formed: 2009
- Reformed: 2021
- Centre: Mārupe
- Subdivisions: List: Babīte Parish Mārupe Mārupe Parish Sala Parish

Government
  - Council Chair: Aivars Osītis (LA)

Area
  - Total: 347.33 km^{2} (134.10 sq mi)
  - Land: 300.67 km^{2} (116.09 sq mi)
  - Water: 46.66 km^{2} (18.02 sq mi)

Population (2026)
  - Total: 38,132
  - Density: 126.82/km^{2} (328.47/sq mi)
- Website: www.marupe.lv

Mārupe Municipality (Latvian: Mārupes novads) is a municipality in Latvia, mostly in Vidzeme region, immediately to the southwest of the capital city of Riga. The municipality was formed in 2009 by the reorganization of Mārupe Parish. The administrative centre is the town of Mārupe. The municipality borders the city of Riga to its east and north-east, the city of Jurmala to its north (partly along the Lielupe river), and the municipalities of Tukums to its west, Jelgava to its southwest, and Olaine to its south and southeast.

On 1 July 2021, Mārupe Municipality was reformed and enlarged when Babīte Municipality was merged into it. Since that date, Mārupe Municipality consists of the following administrative units: Mārupe Parish, Babīte Parish and Sala Parish. Latvian law defines Mārupe Parish and Sala Parish as parts of the Vidzeme region and Babīte Parish as belonging partly to Vidzeme and partly to Semigallia.

Riga International Airport is located in the municipality. The Latvian Civil Aviation Agency has its head office at the airport.

AirBaltic has its head office on the airport property. SmartLynx Airlines has its head office in Mārupe.

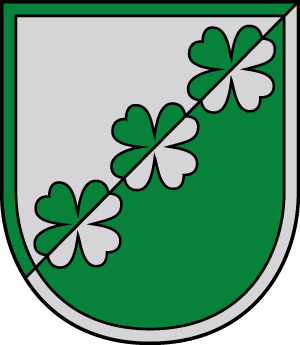
Coat of arms (2009–2021)

Flag (2009–2021), coat of arms being updated

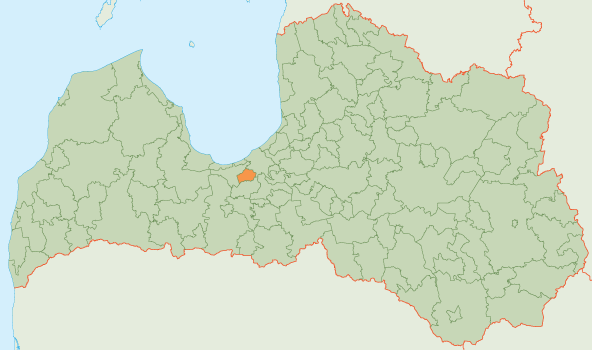
Borders (2009–2021)

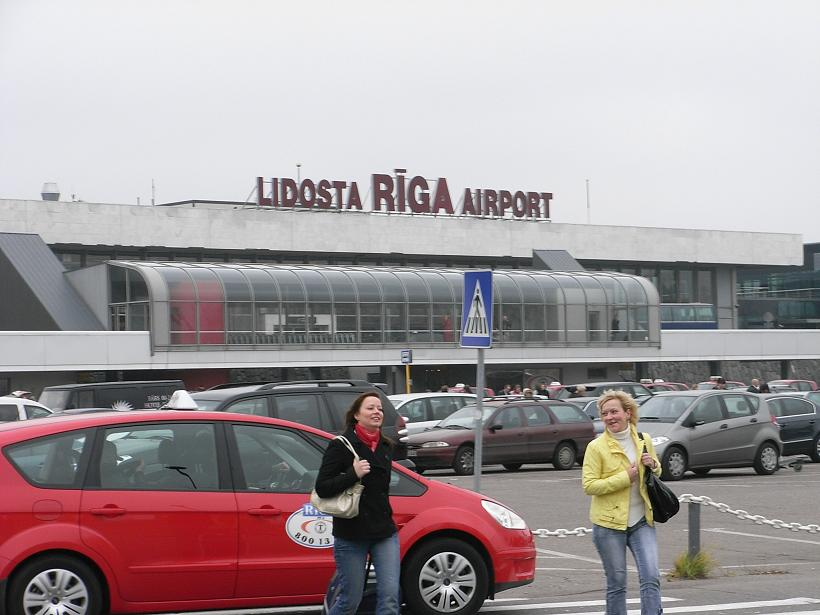
Riga Airport

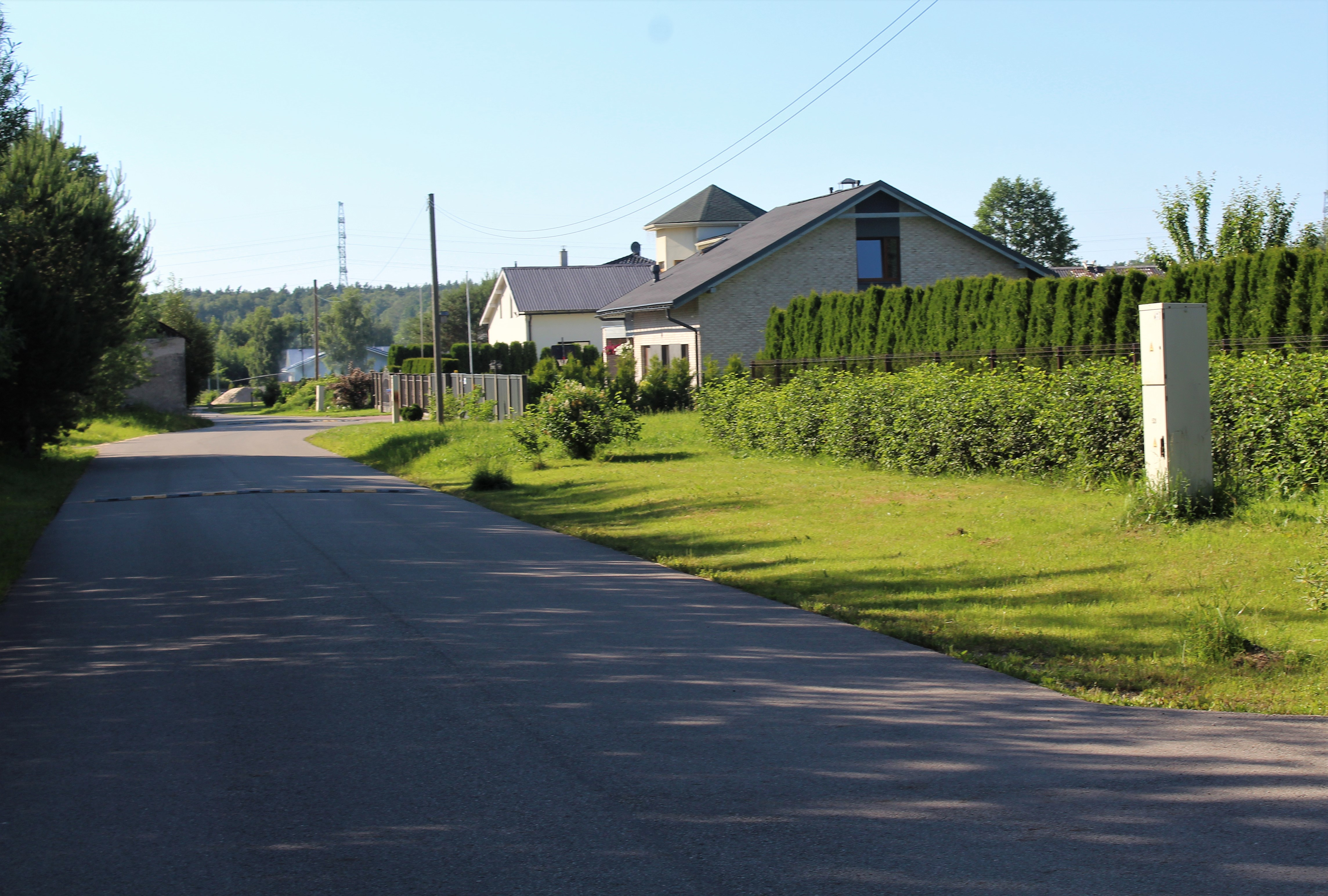
Houses in Mežāres, Babīte Parish

Coat of arms of Mārupe Parish (2001–2010, 2021–now)

== See also ==
- Administrative divisions of Latvia (2009)
