= Riga International Airport =

Airport in Latvia

RIX Riga Airport RIX Rīgas lidosta

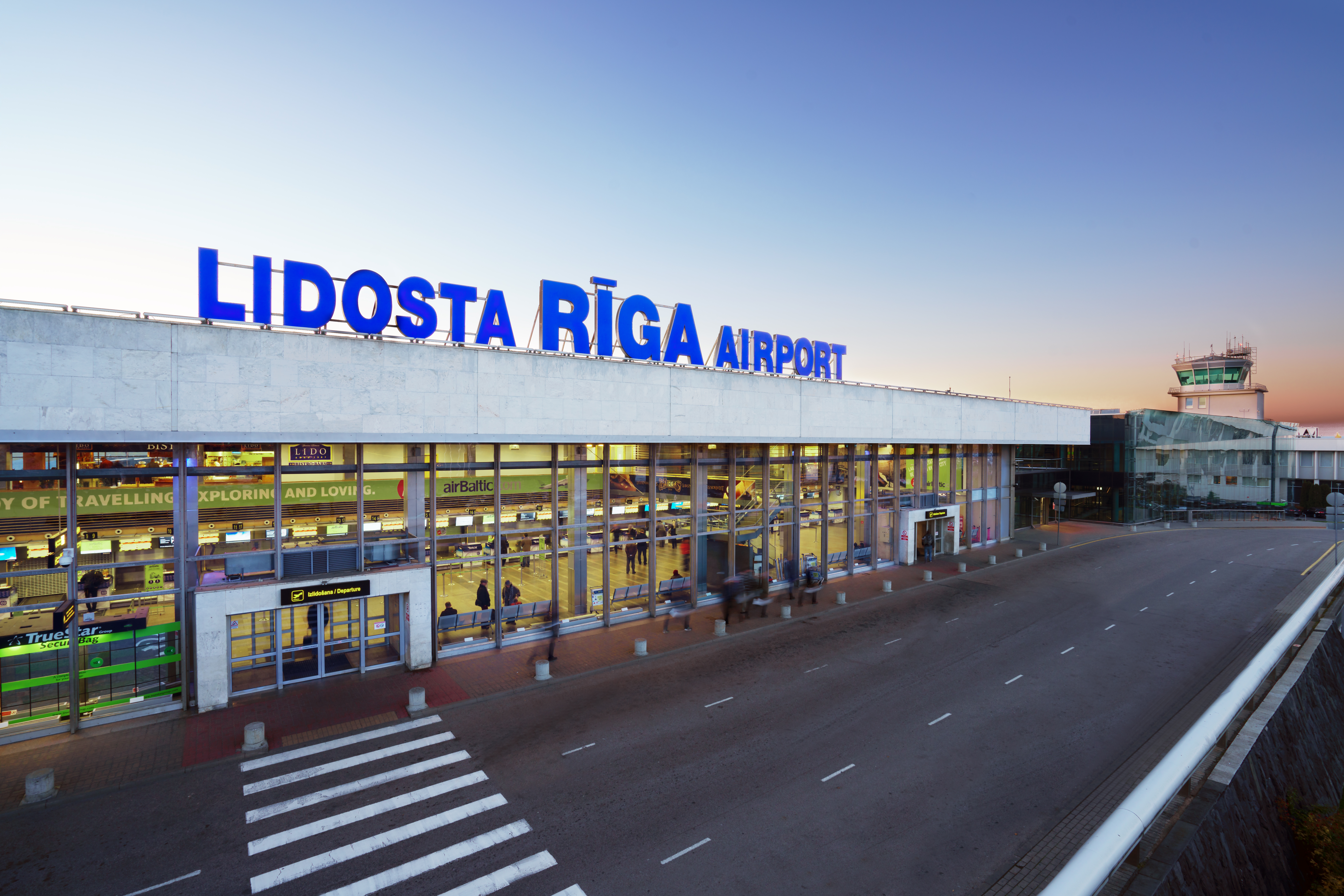
- IATA: RIX; ICAO: EVRA

Summary
- Airport type: Public
- Owner: Government of Latvia
- Serves: Riga, Latvia
- Location: Mārupe Municipality
- Hub for: airBaltic; Norwegian Air Shuttle; SmartLynx Airlines; Ryanair
- Built: 1973
- Elevation AMSL: 36 ft (11 m)
- Coordinates: 56°55′25″N 023°58′16″E
- Website: riga-airport.com

Map
- Location of the airport in Latvia

Runways
Direction	Length		Surface
Direction	m	ft	Surface
18/36	3,200	10,500	Concrete/Asphalt

Statistics (2024)
- Number of Passengers: 7,120,000
- Passenger change 23–24: ▲7%
- Aircraft movements: 63,200
- Movements change 23–24: ▲3%
- Cargo (tonnes): 18,800
- Cargo change 23–24: ▼ -2%
- Source (excluding statistics): AIP at EUROCONTROL

RIX Riga Airport (Latvian: RIX Rīgas lidosta; IATA: RIX, ICAO: EVRA) is the international airport of Riga, the capital of Latvia, and the largest airport in the Baltic states with direct flights to 107 destinations as of September 2024. It is the 12th-busiest airport in post-Soviet states as well as 77th-busiest airport in Europe. It serves as a hub for airBaltic and RAF-Avia, and as one of the base airports for Ryanair and Norwegian Air Shuttle. The Latvian national carrier airBaltic is the largest carrier that serves the airport, followed by Ryanair. The airport is located in the Mārupe Municipality west of Riga, approximately 10 km from its city centre.

== History ==
The airport was built in 1973 as an alternative to Spilve Airport, which had become outdated. It is a state-owned joint-stock company, with the owner of all shares being the government of Latvia. The holder of the state capital share is Latvia's Ministry of Transport.

In March 1995, Uzbekistan Airways began a flight from Tashkent to New York City that stopped in Riga. The carrier operated the service with an Airbus A310. Due to poor demand, the airline rerouted it through Amsterdam three months later. Renovation and modernization of the airport was completed in 2001, coinciding with the 800th anniversary of the founding of the city. Uzbekistan Airways moved the stop on its New York service back to Riga in October 2004. It employed Boeing 767s on the route. Closer ties between Uzbekistan and Latvia and the Latvian government's decision to lower the Riga airport's fees had encouraged the company to return.

In 2006 and 2016, the new north terminal extensions were opened. A maintenance, repair and overhaul facility was opened in the autumn of 2006, to be run as a joint venture between two local companies: Concors and SR-Technik. In 2010, the first dedicated business aviation terminal of the Baltics opened at the airport. Uzbekistan Airways terminated the Riga–New York flight in October 2017.

== Facilities ==
=== Terminal ===
The airport features a single, two-storey passenger terminal building which has been expanded and upgraded to modern standards several times in recent years. The landside consists of a main hall containing a single row of 36 check-in counters as well as some shops and the security area on the upper floor while the arrivals area, baggage reclaim and some service counters are located on the ground floor below. The airside features departure areas B and C split up into two piers with the former original, smaller boarding area A now only used for some arrivals. Both piers feature overall eight stands with jetbridges plus four walk-boarding stands from the upper level as well as several more gates for bus boarding on their ground levels. The B pier is used for Schengen Area departures and arrivals, while the C pier is for both Schengen and non-Schengen Area departures and arrivals. The terminal features outlets by Narvesen and Costa Coffee amongst others, as well as a single airport lounge. And now they have started the master plan which includes building a south pier, and a new air traffic control tower.

=== Runway ===
The airport has a single runway in directions 18/36, which is 3,200 m in length and equipped with ILS CAT II. ILS frequency of 110.30

=== Other facilities ===
Both airBaltic and the Latvian Civil Aviation Agency maintain their head offices at Riga International Airport.

== Airlines and destinations ==
=== Passenger ===
The following airlines operate regular scheduled and charter flights to and from Riga:

Airlines	Destinations
Aegean Airlines	Seasonal: Athens
Air Montenegro	Seasonal charter: Tivat
airBaltic	Alicante, Amsterdam, Athens, Barcelona, Berlin, Billund, Brussels, Bucharest–Otopeni, Budapest, Chișinău, Copenhagen, Dubai–International, Dublin (ends 4 January 2027), Düsseldorf, Frankfurt, Hamburg, Helsinki, Istanbul, Larnaca, Lisbon, London–Gatwick, Madrid, Málaga, Milan–Malpensa, Munich, Nice, Oslo, Oulu, Palanga, Paris–Charles de Gaulle, Prague, Reykjavík–Keflavík, Rome–Fiumicino, Sofia, Stockholm–Arlanda, Tallinn, Tampere, Tbilisi, Tel Aviv, Tenerife, Turku, Vienna, Vilnius, Zurich; Seasonal: Belgrade, Burgas, Catania, Corfu, Dubrovnik, Funchal, Geneva, Gran Canaria, Heraklion, Hurghada, Innsbruck (ends 20 December 2026), Kuusamo (begins 11 December 2026), Ljubljana, Marrakesh, Naples, Palma de Mallorca, Pisa, Porto, Rhodes, Salzburg, Sharm El Sheikh, Split, Thessaloniki, Tirana, Turin (begins 30 January 2027), Tivat, Venice, Verona, Warsaw–Chopin; Seasonal charter: Lamezia Terme, Patras
Finnair	Helsinki
flydubai	Dubai (begins 11 December 2026)
FlyOne	Tashkent
Freebird Airlines	Seasonal charter: Antalya
Heston Airlines	Seasonal charter: Bergamo, Burgas, Enfidha, Hurghada, Sharm El Sheikh, Tivat
LOT Polish Airlines	Warsaw–Chopin
Lufthansa	Frankfurt
Mavi Gök Airlines	Seasonal charter: Antalya
Norwegian Air Shuttle	Alicante, Bergen, Copenhagen, Oslo, Stockholm–Arlanda, Trondheim; Seasonal: Burgas, Gothenburg, Tivat
Ryanair	Aarhus, Barcelona, Bergamo, Charleroi, Dublin, East Midlands, Edinburgh, Kraków, Leeds/Bradford, London–Stansted, Málaga, Malta, Manchester, Memmingen, Paphos, Prague, Rome–Fiumicino, Sandefjord, Stockholm–Arlanda, Treviso; Seasonal: Cologne/Bonn
Scandinavian Airlines	Copenhagen
Skyline Express	Seasonal charter: Hurghada
SkyUp Airlines	Seasonal charter: Sharm El Sheikh
Turkish Airlines	Istanbul
Uzbekistan Airways	Tashkent

== Statistics ==
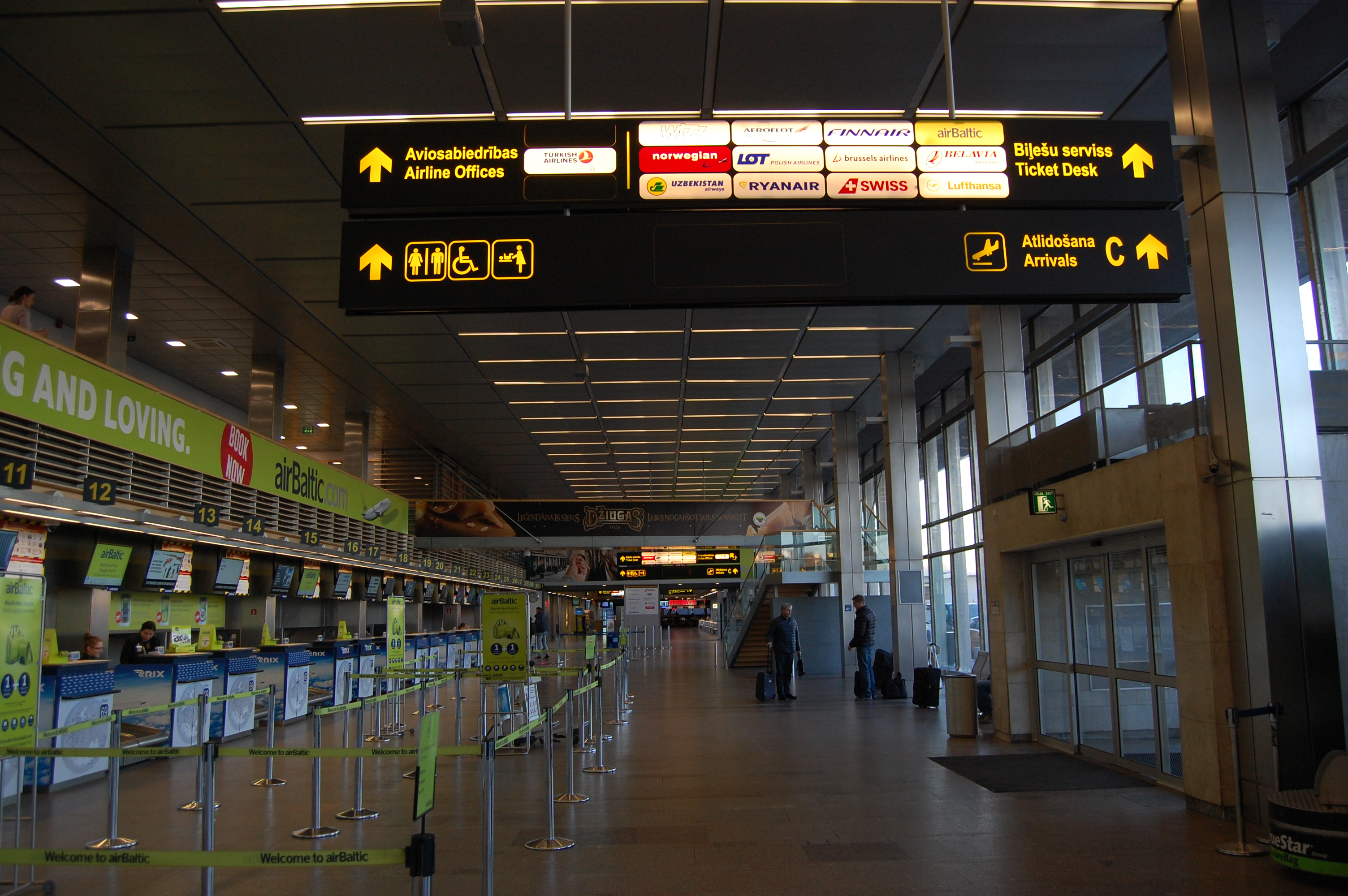
Check-in hall

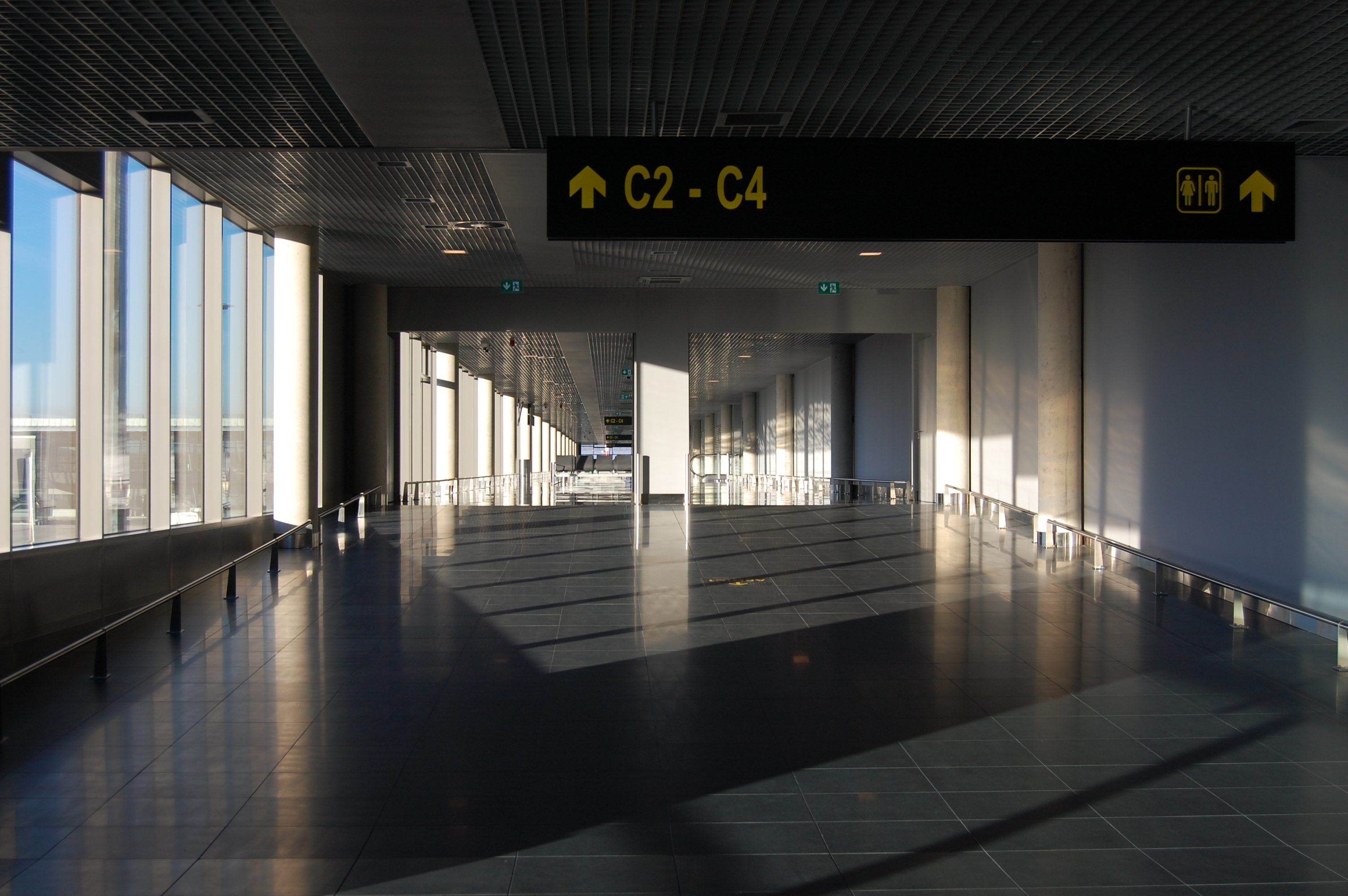
Hallway between piers B and C

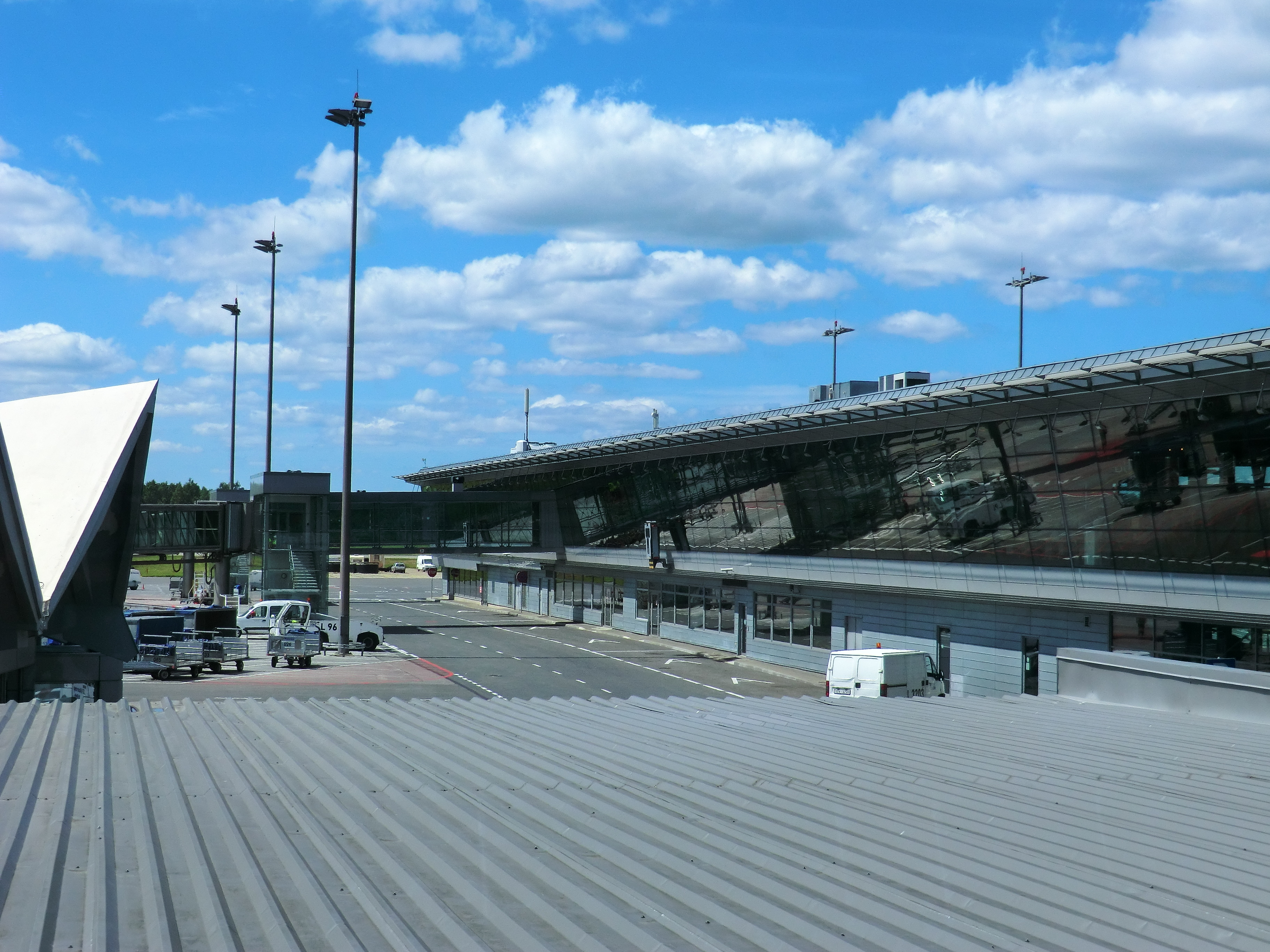
View of the B pier

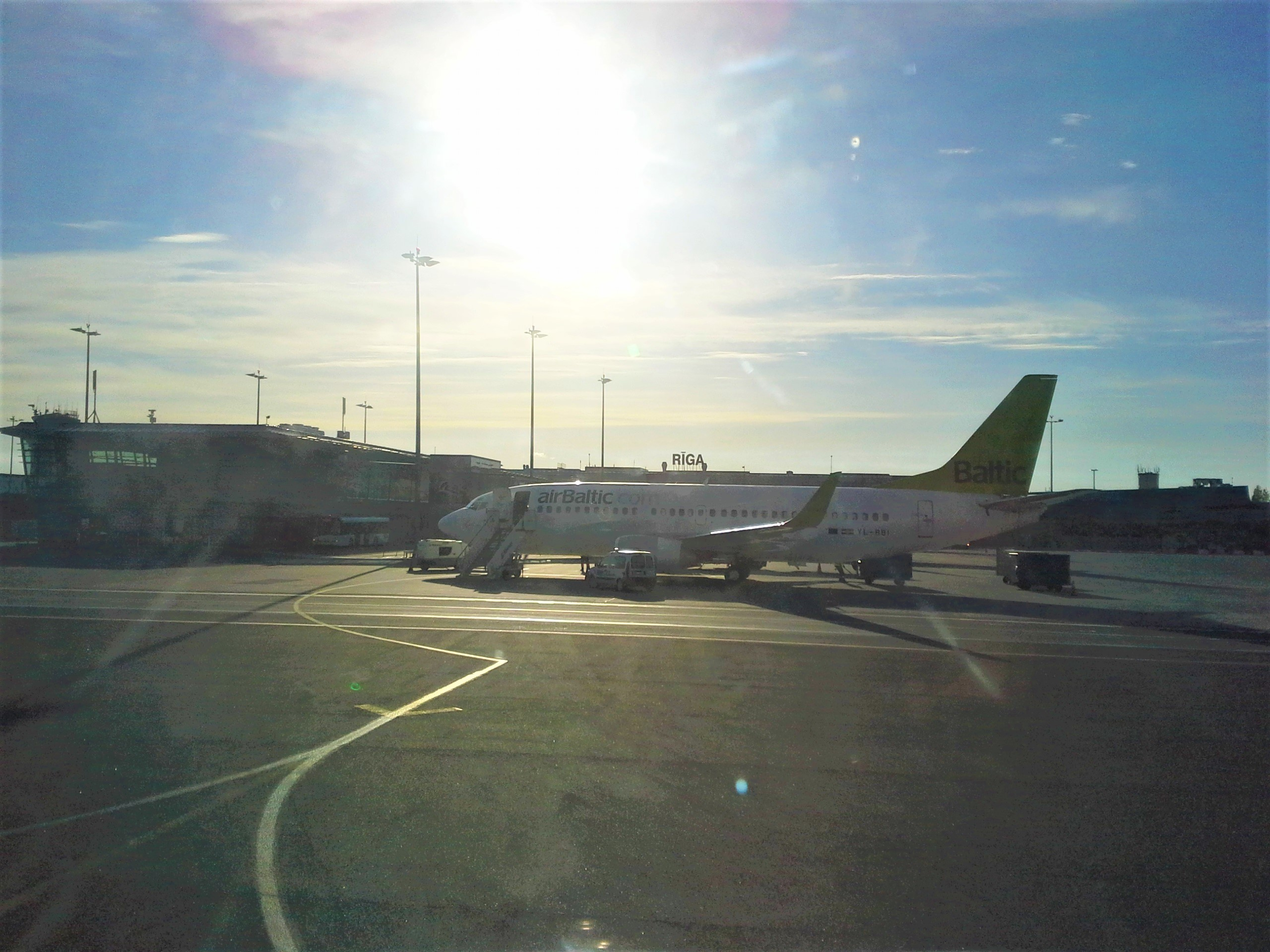
RIX terminal view from tarmac

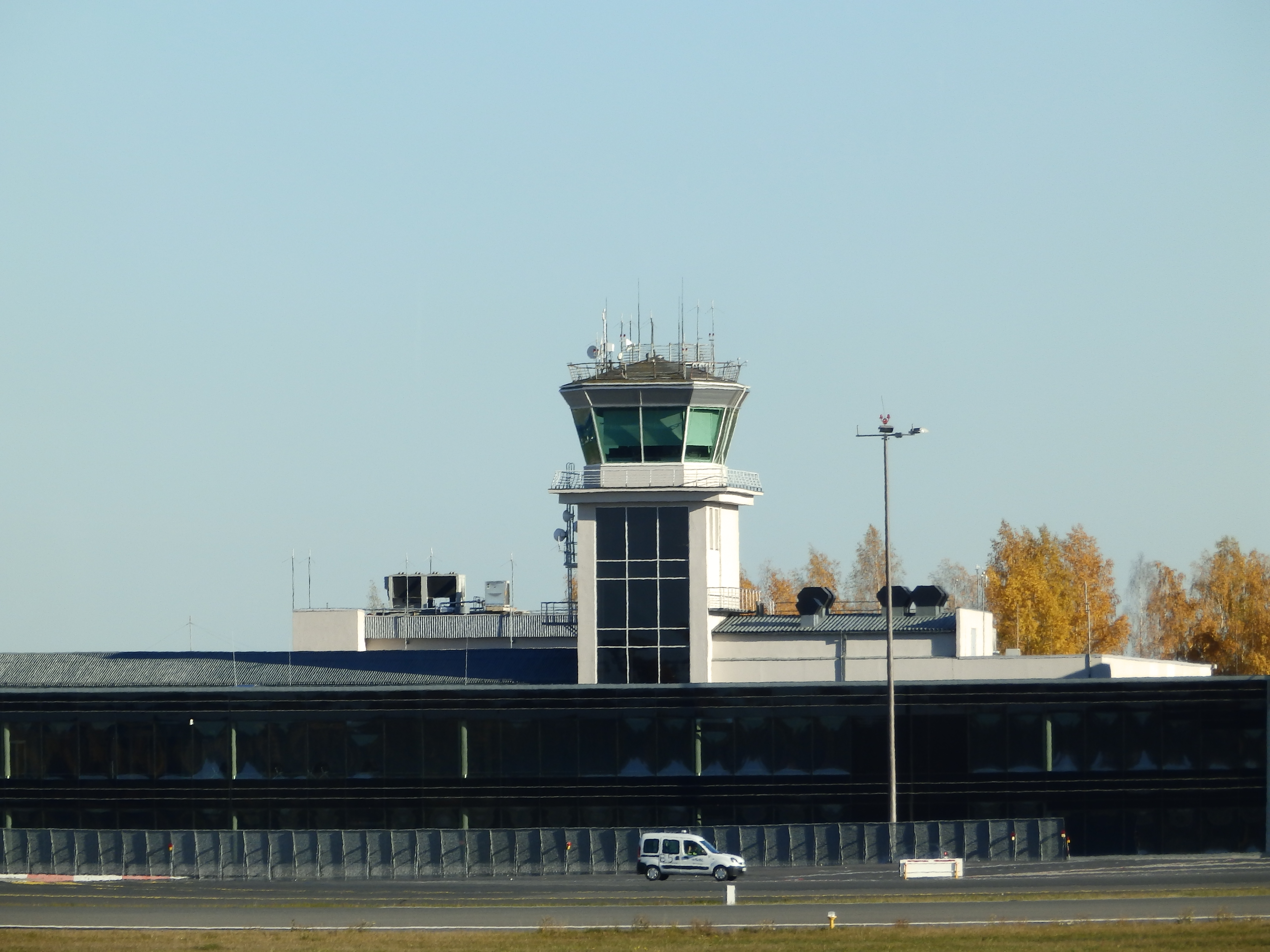
Control tower

=== Route statistics ===
Busiest routes from Riga (2025)
Rank	City	Share of total traffic	Airlines
1	London	6.7%	airBaltic, Ryanair
2	Helsinki	5.3%	airBaltic, Finnair
3	Oslo	4.8%	airBaltic, Ryanair, Norwegian Air Shuttle
4	Stockholm	4.6%	airBaltic, Ryanair, Norwegian Air Shuttle
5	Tallinn	4.3%	airBaltic
6	Frankfurt	3.8%	airBaltic, Lufthansa
7	Vilnius	3.6%	airBaltic
8	Amsterdam	3.1%	airBaltic
9	Copenhagen	3.0%	airBaltic, Norwegian Air Shuttle
10	Istanbul	3.0%	airBaltic, Turkish Airlines

Busiest Countries served from Riga (2025)
Rank	Country	Share of total traffic
1	Germany	10.5%
2	United Kingdom	10.1%
3	Finland	7.6%
4	Spain	5.5%
5	Turkey	5.4%
6	Italy	5.2%
7	Sweden	5.1%
8	Norway	5.0%
9	Lithuania	4.5%
10	Estonia	4.3%

Top ten most frequent routes from Riga as of July 2025
Rank	City	Flights per week
1	Helsinki	~56
2	Tallinn	~32
3	Stockholm	~28
4	Vilnius	~25
5	Oslo Gardermoen	~22
6	Amsterdam	~20
7	Frankfurt	~20
8	Warsaw	~20
9	Copenhagen	~18
10	Istanbul	~16

=== Largest airlines ===
Largest airlines by passengers (2025)
Rank	Airline	Alliance	2025, %
1	airBaltic	No	57%
2	Ryanair	No	23%
3	Norwegian Air Shuttle	No	5%
4	Lufthansa	Star Alliance	3%
5	LOT Polish Airlines	Star Alliance	2%
6	Others	No	10%

== Ground transportation ==
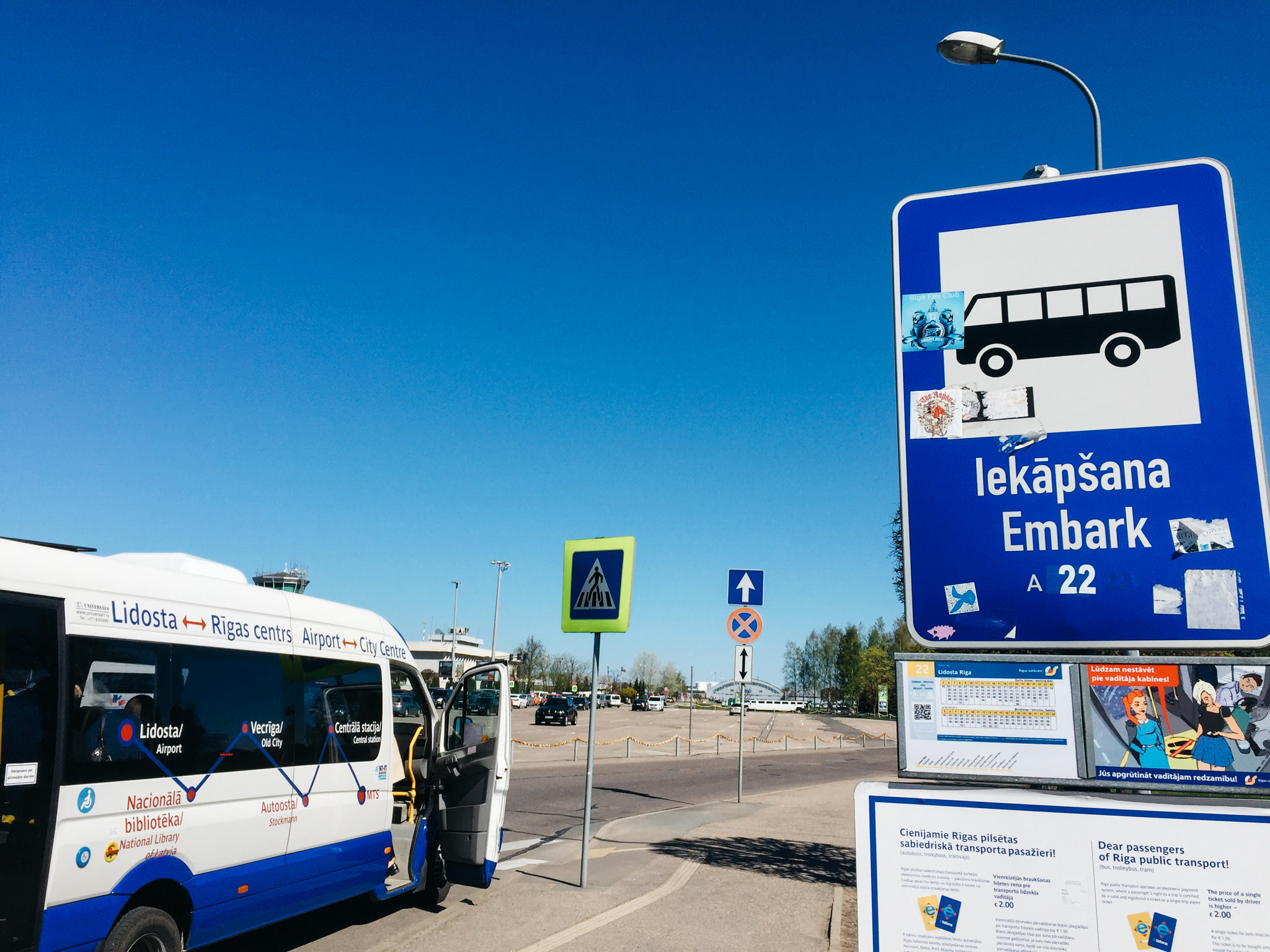
Bus stop at Riga Airport

=== Bus ===
Riga Airport is accessible by bus line 22, operated by Rīgas Satiksme, which runs between Riga city centre and the airport. A shuttlebus service to the airport from the Riga International Bus Terminal was launched in 2024 by Lux Express, but was discontinued in 2025 due to low demand. Moreover, there are international bus connections from the airport to cities in Estonia, Lithuania, Poland and Germany.

=== Taxi ===
Due to instances of overcharging passengers, a taxi voucher system was implemented in April 2024 that offers a fixed-price ticket for a trip to central Riga (right and left bank) by using companies which have received a special licence. Other taxis and ride hailing services are also available.

=== Car ===
Riga Airport can be reached by car via the highway P133 which connects the airport with European route E22. The airport has 3 car parking areas, with ~1500 parking spaces, offering both short- and long-term parking.

=== Rail ===
An airport train station is included as part of the Rail Baltica project. A contract for construction design was signed on 20 March 2018.

Preceding station	Rail Baltica	Following station
Panevėžys	Rail Baltica	Riga, Latvia

== Incidents and accidents ==
- On 17 September 2016, an airBaltic Bombardier Dash 8 Q400 NextGen aircraft made an emergency landing without its nose landing gear deployed. The plane was carrying 63 passengers and 4 crew members and was forced to return to Riga following issues with its front chassis. The runway was closed between 10:26 and 15:55 as a safety precaution following an emergency landing. Seven inbound flights and four outbound flights were cancelled, 17 flights were diverted to Tallinn Airport and Kaunas Airport and others were delayed. The aircraft involved was YL-BAI and the flight BT 641 was scheduled to fly from Riga to Zürich Airport. No injuries were reported.
- On 17 February 2017, a VIM Airlines charter flight to Ufa, Russia slid off the runway during take-off. The aircraft was carrying the Togliatti Lada ice hockey club team, including 40 passengers and 7 crew members. No injuries were reported. The aircraft's engine was damaged as it hit airport equipment. The runway was inspected and closed for three hours after the incident. Flights were diverted to Tallinn Airport and Kaunas Airport and others were delayed.
- On 3 December 2021, due to heavy snowfall, an airBaltic Airbus A220-300 (YL-CSE) slid off the runway after the landing from Stockholm on flight BT102.
- On 8 March 2023, an airBaltic flight from Paris slid off the runway while landing. None of the 89 passengers or 7 crew members were injured.

== See also ==
- List of the busiest airports in Europe
- List of largest airports in the Baltic states
- List of the busiest airports in the former USSR
- List of airports in Latvia
- Transportation in Latvia
- Rīgas Satiksme (Riga Public Transport)
