= Ascend Airways =

British ACMI and charter airline

IATA	ICAO	Call sign
YD	SYG	SYNERGY
- Founded: 2004 (as Synergy Aviation); July 2023 (as Ascend Airways)
- Commenced operations: 26 April 2024; 2 years ago (as Ascend Airways)
- Ceased operations: 28 April 2026
- Operating bases: Gatwick Airport; Southend Airport
- Fleet size: 7
- Destinations: Charter & ACMI
- Parent company: Avia Solutions Group
- Headquarters: Bishop's Stortford, England
- Key people: Alastair Willson (CEO)
- Website: ascendairways.aero

Ascend Airways formerly Synergy Aviation, was a British ACMI (Aircraft, Crew, Maintenance, and Insurance) and charter airline headquartered in Bishop's Stortford, England. It was a subsidiary of Avia Solutions Group. It specialised in providing wet-lease capacity for other UK-based airlines, tour operators and government departments.

== History ==
The airline's origins date back to 2004, when it was founded as Synergy Aviation. Initially operating as a small-scale charter and management firm, it was acquired by Avia Solutions Group in July 2023 to serve as their primary UK-based operator.

Following its acquisition by Avia Solutions Group, the company was rebranded as Ascend Airways. In April 2024, the airline secured its Type A Operating Licence and route licence from the UK CAA, allowing it to operate aircraft with more than 20 seats. Its inaugural commercial flight took place on 26 April 2024, operating from London Southend Airport on behalf of Chapman Freeborn.

In 2025, the airline significantly expanded its fleet and international presence. On 3 November 2025, it was reported that a sister carrier, Ascend Airways Malaysia, was launched to provide similar ACMI services in Southeast Asia.

On 28 April 2026, Avia Solutions Group released a statement that it would be surrendering the UK air operator's certificate for Ascend Airways. It blamed the ongoing tensions in the middle east and the increased prices of jet fuel for the cessation of operations. Chief Executive Alistair Wilson also blamed the persisting issues with the Boeing 737 MAX fleet as another contributing factor.

== Operations ==
Ascend Airways primarily operated on behalf of other carriers during peak seasons or to cover maintenance gaps. Notable long-term partnerships have included:

- TUI Airways: Wet-lease operations out of London Gatwick in summer 2024 and summer 2025.
- Oman Air: A wet-lease agreement announced in December 2025 to support the Middle Eastern carrier's network.
- Air Sierra Leone: Providing operational capacity for the newly launched West African flag carrier.

== Fleet ==
As of January 2026, prior to its cessation, the Ascend Airways fleet consisted of the following aircraft:

Ascend Airways fleet on closure
Aircraft	In service	Orders	Notes
Boeing 737-800	1	—	
Boeing 737 MAX 8	6	—	
Total	7	—	
