= FL Technics =

Lithuanian aircraft maintenance company

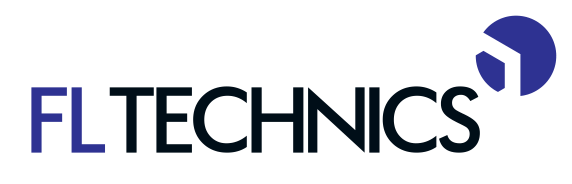
- Type: Privately Held Company
- Industry: Aviation
- Founded: 2005
- Headquarters: Vilnius, Lithuania
- Key people: Žilvinas Lapinskas, CEO
- Services: MRO
- Number of employees: 2500+ (Global, 2024)
- Parent: Avia Solutions Group

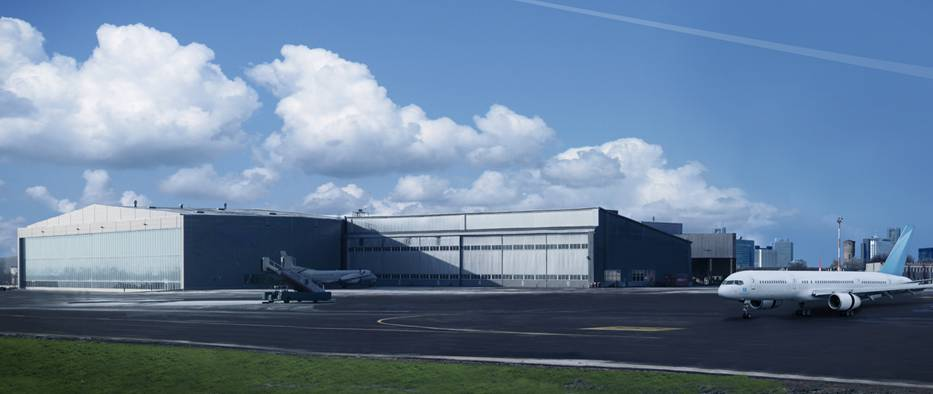
FL Technics hangar in Vilnius International Airport

FL Technics is a global provider of aircraft maintenance, repair and overhaul (MRO) services, headquartered in Vilnius, Lithuania. The company has Base Maintenance facilities in Lithuania, the United Kingdom and Indonesia, and provides Line Maintenance support across Europe, Middle East, North America and Asia-Pacific.

As an EASA Part-145, Part-CAMO, Part-147, Part-21, FAA, UK CAA, GCAA and other National civil Aviation authorities’ certified company, FL Technics serves a wide range of Boeing, Airbus, ATR, Embraer, Bombardier and other types of aircraft.

FL Technics is a part of Avia Solutions Group, which is led by Jonas Janukenas, CEO, and Gediminas Ziemelis, Chairman of the Board. Zilvinas Lapinskas is the CEO of FL Technics.

== Overview ==
The company specializes in base and line maintenance, spare parts and component support, engine, APU & LG management, full aircraft engineering, technical training services, design and production, wheels and brakes, as well as logistics. FL Technics is part of Avia Solutions Group, one of the world's largest ACMI (aircraft, crew, maintenance, and insurance) providers with more than 192 aircraft in their fleet, and a parent company of SmartLynx, Avion Express, BBN Airlines, KlasJet, Magma Aviation. The Group also provides various aviation services such as MRO (maintenance, repair, and overhaul), pilots and crew training, ground handling and other interconnected services. Avia Solutions Group has 14 000 employees worldwide. FL Technics is a FAA-145 approved, as well as certified EASA Part-145, Part-CAMO, Part-147, Part-21 and GCAA certified company with hangars in Lithuania, Indonesia, and the United Kingdom, along with 70+ line stations around the world.

== History ==
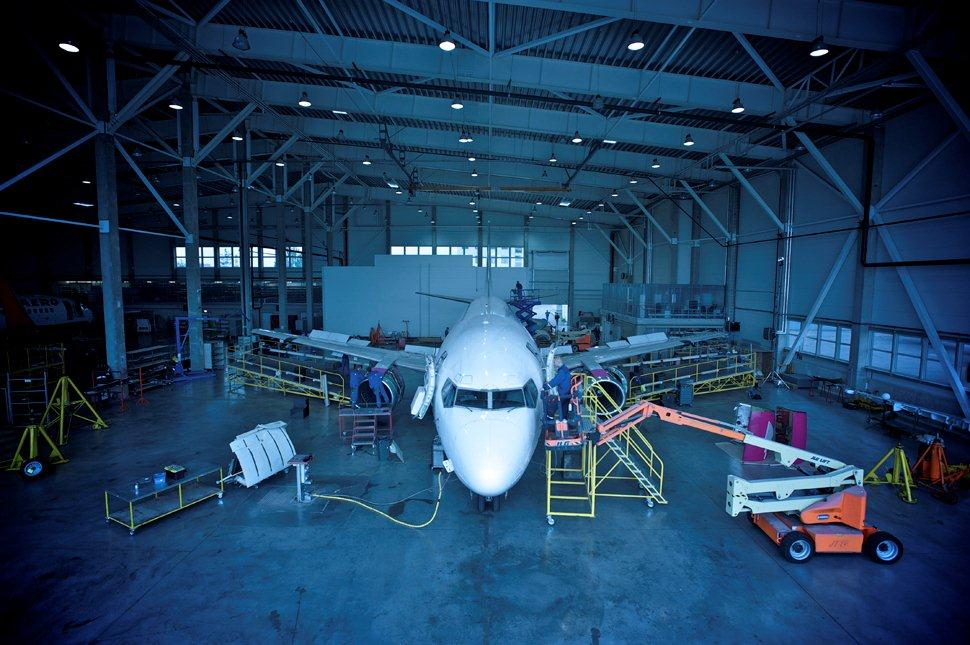
Inside of FL Technics hangar in International Vilnius Airport

=== 2005 ===
The company was founded in Lithuania and opened its first hangar at the Vilnius International Airport.

=== 2007 ===
The company added a second hangar at the Vilnius International Airport. Since then FL Technics occupies 2 aircraft maintenance hangars, a warehouse, and backshop facilities at the Vilnius International Airport – 13 742 sq. meters in total. The hangars consist of five airframe maintenance bays.

=== 2009 ===
In May, the company signed a contract with the Slovak airline Seagle Air for periodic maintenance of Boeing 737 aircraft.

In July, the company signed a strategic partnership agreement with a Costa Rican aircraft maintenance company to provide FL Technics services on their technical basis for the overhaul of Boeing 757-200 long-haul aircraft.

In October, the company signed contracts with Air Italy and Air Slovakia for the maintenance of the Boeing 737-300 aircraft base.

At the end of the year, the company was renamed FL Technics.

=== 2010 ===
In February, FL Technics acquired the Boeing 737-300 glider from GE Capital Aviation Services (GECAS).

In June, FL Technics expanded its PART-145 maintenance capabilities with basic Boeing 737-600/700/800/900 maintenance services.

In August, the company expanded its maintenance training capabilities with ATR 42-200/300 and ATR 72-100/200 theoretical training services. In the same month, FL Technics purchased a second Boeing 737-300 fuselage for disassembly.

In December, FL Technics added the Airbus A318 / A319 / A320 / A321 to its PART-M feature list.

By the end of the year, FL Technics began operating nine line stations — three in Kazakhstan, two in Tajikistan, and the remaining four located in UK, Italy, Russia, and Vilnius.

=== 2011 ===
In February, FL Technics serviced the first Airbus A320 aircraft. The Airbus A320 family of aircraft has been supplemented by FL Technics' EASA Part-145 certificate. The certification was conducted by the Lithuanian Civil Aviation Authority.

In June, FLT Technics received Part-M certification to support the airworthiness of the Embraer EMB-135/145 family of aircraft.

In July, FL Technics began providing comprehensive fixed-line line technical support to Wizz Air combined with additional support services. In the same month, FL Technics purchased 7 Boeing 737-300 aircraft from AirAsia for disassembly into parts and components. The plane was disassembled in Malaysia. This acquisition allowed FL Technics to increase its level of service while maintaining a wider range of spare parts and components.

In August, FL Technics received a certificate for engineering services for the Bombardier CL600-2B19. In the same month, FL Technics launched cabin modification and reconfiguration services on two new Boeing 737-800 long-haul aircraft and cabin repair services on the Boeing 737-300 for Transaero.

In September, FL Technics acquired the UK-based Storm Aviation Limited. The acquired company allowed FL Technics to begin performing Line Maintenance services for narrow body and wide body aircraft in a network of 24 Line Stations across Europe and the CIS and expanded FL Technics aircraft capabilities into Airbus A330, Airbus A340, Airbus A380, Boeing 747, Boeing 767, Boeing 777 and other types of aircraft. In September, FL Technics also expanded its partnership with Europe Airpost to provide 3 aircraft maintenance services. Boeing 737 Cl.

=== 2012 ===
In May, FL Technics became a sales representative for the UK parts distributor Aero Inventory in Eastern Europe and the Commonwealth of Independent States (CIS).

=== 2022 ===
In February, FL Technics received two extensions within current Part-145 approval for providing line maintenance services for Boeing B787 aircraft, and for borescope inspections of Pratt & Whitney PW1100G-JM series engines.

In April, the company opened an aircraft wheel and brake maintenance shop at Hanover International Airport, Germany.

In August, FL Technics signed a partnership agreement with Saudia.

In September, the company launched a line maintenance operations in Abu Dhabi.

In October, FL Technics unified its acquired companies and continued operation under a single brand.

In November, FL Technics Engine Services was approved by US Federal Aviation Administration (FAA) to provide aircraft engine repair and maintenance services in Kaunas, Lithuania.

=== 2023 ===
In January, FL Technics received certification update with extended CAMO (Continuing Airworthiness Management Organisation) capabilities to service Airbus A220, Boeing B737-MAX and B787 aircraft, followed by certification to provide Airbus A350 type training in February.

In August FL Technics started establishing a new maintenance, repair, and overhaul (MRO) infrastructure at Punta Cana International Airport (PUJ) in the Caribbean.

At the same month FL Technics Indonesia, a subsidiary of FL Technics, and PT Angkasa Pura Properti, together with PT Angkasa Pura I, started the development of 17,000 sq. m. aircraft MRO hub at I Gusti Ngurah Rai International Airport (DPS) in Bali.

Also in August 2023, the company secured certification by the UK Civil Aviation Authority (CAA) to extend its Part-145 maintenance capabilities to the CFM56 family of engines.

In November 2023, FL Technics became the first independent Aircraft Maintenance Organization (AMO) service provider at Abu Dhabi's airport (Terminal A).

=== 2024 ===
In July 2024, FL Technics announced plans to open a new wheels and brakes repair shop at Milan Bergamo Airport in 2025, continuing its expansion strategy. The company also considers expanding its engine services to other locations, following its 2022 entry into wheels and brakes repairs with facilities in Hanover, Vilnius, and Budapest.

In November 2024, FL Technics Indonesia received extended approval from the Civil Aviation Authority of Malaysia (CAAM) for its Jakarta and Bali maintenance facilities. This approval allows the company to provide MRO services for Airbus A321, Boeing 737-800, and 737-400 aircraft.

At the same year, FL Technics established a new MRO center at Punta Cana International Airport in the Dominican Republic, set to include five bays for base maintenance and supporting shops. The new facility spans 52,000 square meters, with construction expected to take up to two years.

In December 2024, FL Technics opened a new base maintenance facility in Bali, Indonesia, to address the growing demand for narrowbody aircraft MRO services in the Asia-Pacific region. The six-bay hangar at I Gusti Ngurah Rai International Airport focuses on Boeing 737 and Airbus A320 repairs and aims to create up to 500 jobs.

=== Facilities ===
==== Base maintenance facilities ====
- Vilnius (Lithuania): 4 narrow-body a/c, over 7700 sq.m. hangar and workshop space
- Kaunas (Lithuania): 5 narrow-body a/c, 8500 sq.m. hangar and workshop space
- Jakarta (Indonesia): 3 narrow-body a/c, over 20 000 sq.m. hangar and workshop space
- Bali (Indonesia): 6 narrow-body a/c, over 15 000 sq.m. hangar and workshop space
- Prestwick (United Kingdom) through subsidiary Chevron Technical Services: 3 narrow-body a/c, 6000 sq.m. hangar space
- Punta Cana (Dominica Republic) 5 narrow-body a/c, 19 500 sq.m. hangar and workshop space (under construction)

==== Other facilities ====
- FL Technics Engine Repair Shop in Kaunas, Lithuania
- FL Technics Wheels & Brakes shop in Hanover, Germany
- FL Technics Wheels & Brakes shop in Budapest, Hungary
- FL Technics Wheels & Brakes shop in Milan, Italy (under construction)

== Acquisitions ==
- Flash Line Maintenance S.r.l., Italy
- Storm Aviation, London, United Kingdom
- Wright International, Canada
- Chevron Technical Services, United Kingdom, merged with Storm Aviation
