= Kaunas Airport =

Airport in Lithuania

Kaunas Airport Kauno Oro uostas

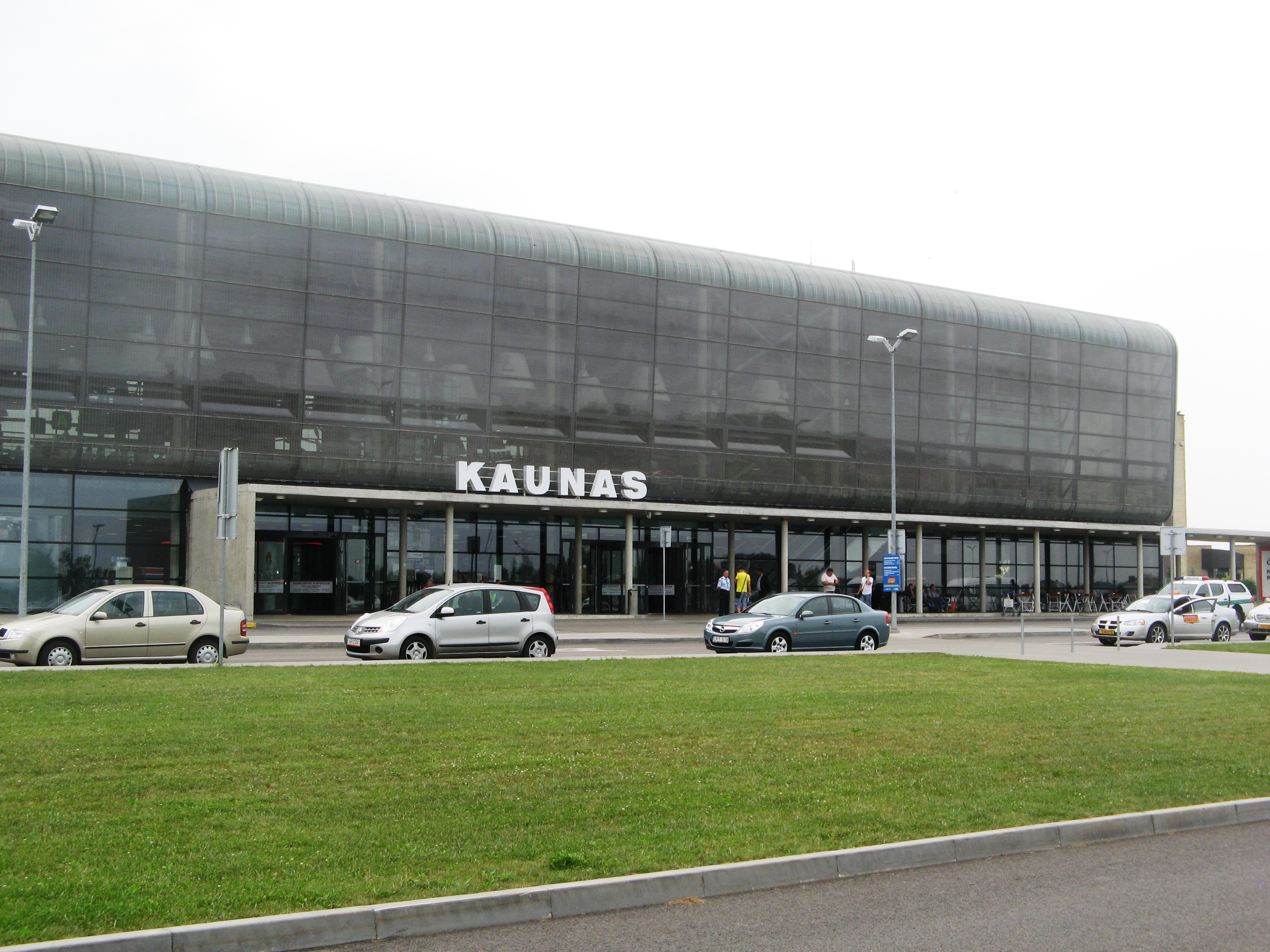
- IATA: KUN; ICAO: EYKA

Summary
- Airport type: Public
- Owner: Ministry of Transport and Communications
- Operator: SE "Lithuanian Airports"
- Serves: Kaunas, Lithuania
- Location: Karmėlava
- Opened: 1988
- Hub for: Ryanair
- Elevation AMSL: 259 ft (79 m)
- Coordinates: 54°57′50″N 24°05′05″E
- Website: kaunas-airport.lt

Map
- Location in Lithuania

Runways
Direction	Length		Surface
Direction	m	ft	Surface
08/26	3,250	10,663	Asphalt

Statistics (2019)
- Passengers total: 1,160,591
- Passenger change 18–19: ▲14.8%
- Aircraft movements total: 9,888
- Movements change 18–19: ▲4.6%
- Cargo (tonnes) total: 3,196
- Cargo change 18–19: ▲37.2%
- Sources: Kaunas Airport and AZ world airports

Kaunas Airport (Lithuanian: Kauno tarptautinis oro uostas) (IATA: KUN, ICAO: EYKA) is the second-busiest civil airport in Lithuania after Vilnius Čiurlionis International Airport and the fourth-busiest in the Baltic states. The airport is located in the central part of the country, 14 km (8.7 mi) northeast of the Kaunas city centre and 100 km (62 mi) west from the capital Vilnius.

== History ==
Ryanair started operating flights to Kaunas in 2004. In 2006 it announced establishment of its base in Kaunas. At the beginning of 2013, Ryanair invested more than 3 million euros in a new aircraft maintenance and repair hangar in Kaunas, which currently employs 220 people (2018 data). The airline is further expanding its aircraft maintenance activity at Kaunas Airport, with a planned further investment of 1.6 million euros, which will allow the servicing of twice as many aircraft. The company intends to employ 40 additional aviation mechanics, and the employment strategy is based on the company's collaboration with the Kaunas School of Mechanics at Kaunas University of Technology in order to prepare necessary specialists and invite students for traineeships.

Wizzair operated a Kaunas - Warsaw - London Luton route for a short period of time in 2005. The airline returned to Kaunas in 2012.

Two temporary terminals were in operation in 2017, when Vilnius Airport was closed for reconstruction and flights transferred to Kaunas.

LOT Polish Airlines started operating six weekly flights to Kaunas International from Warsaw Chopin Airport on 21 May 2018.

== Overview ==
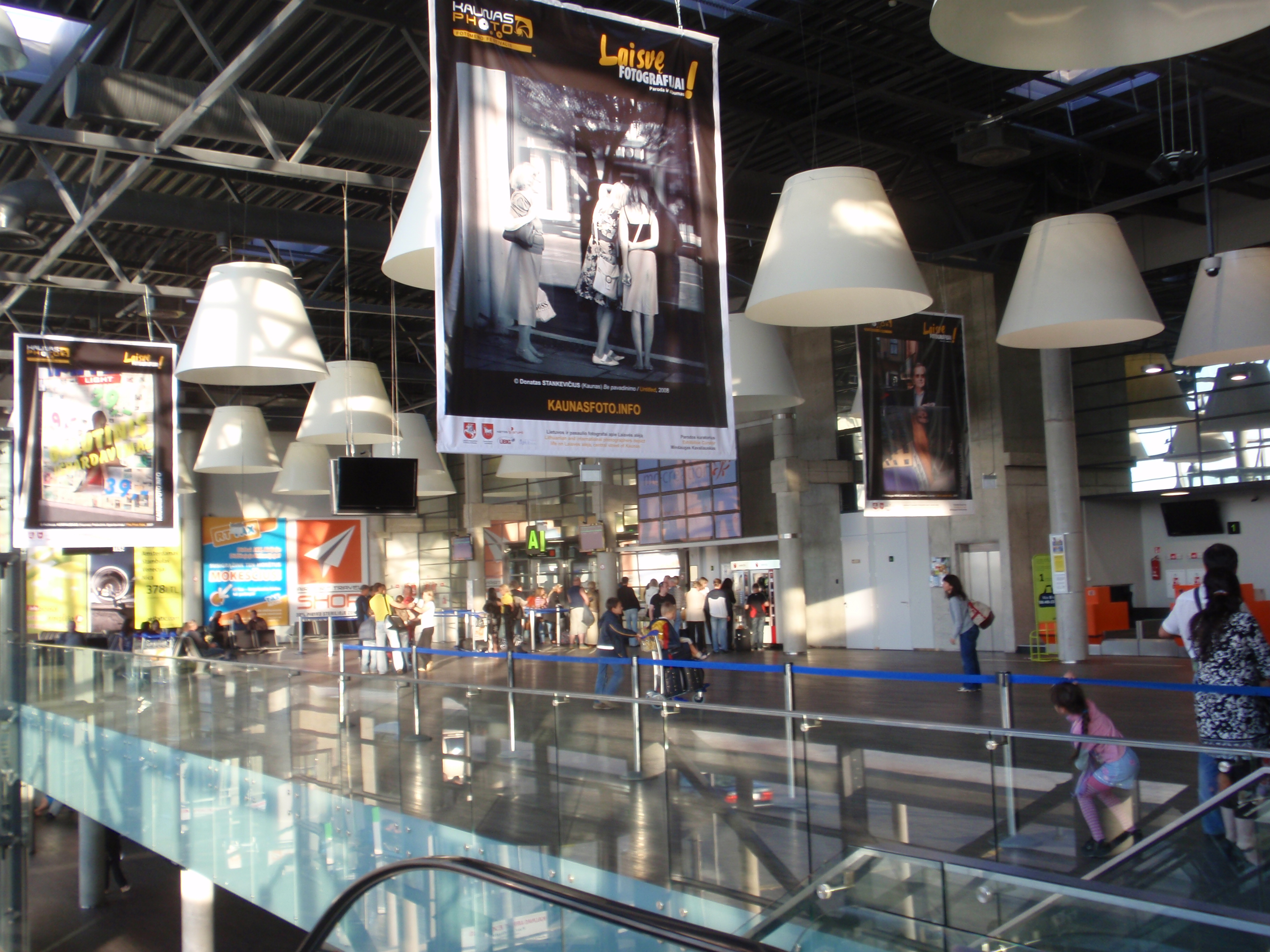
Departures hall

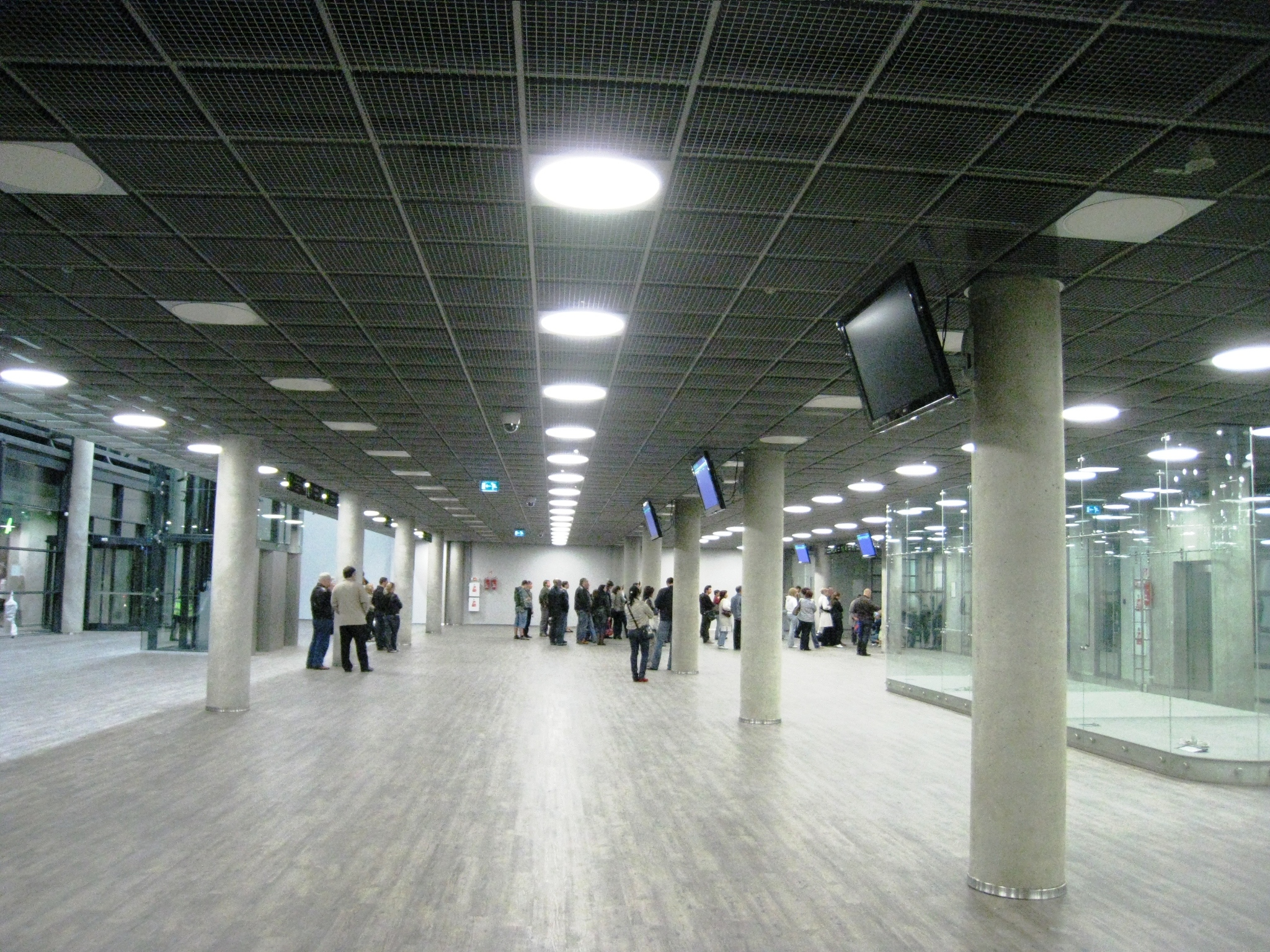
Inside the terminal building

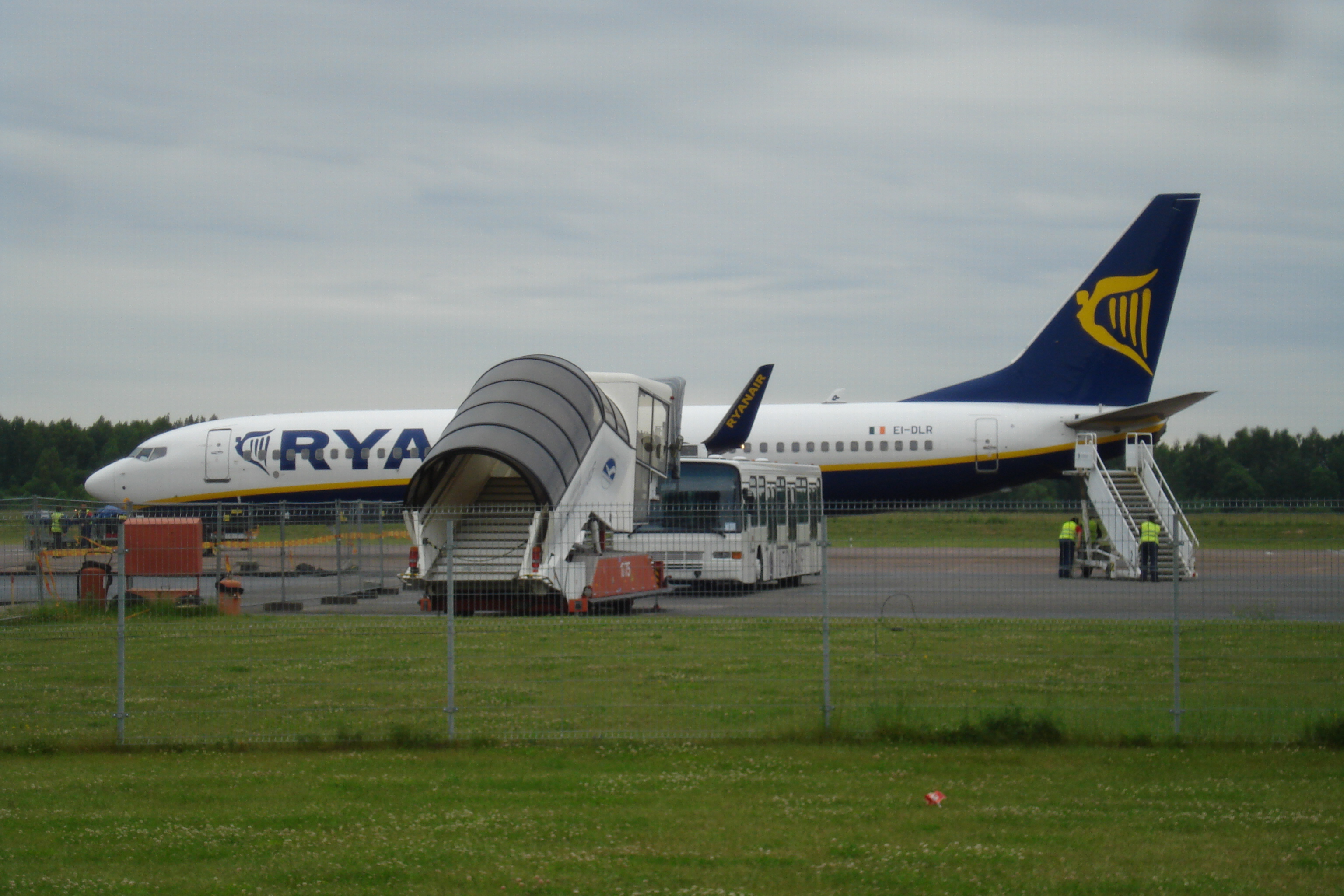
Ramp view

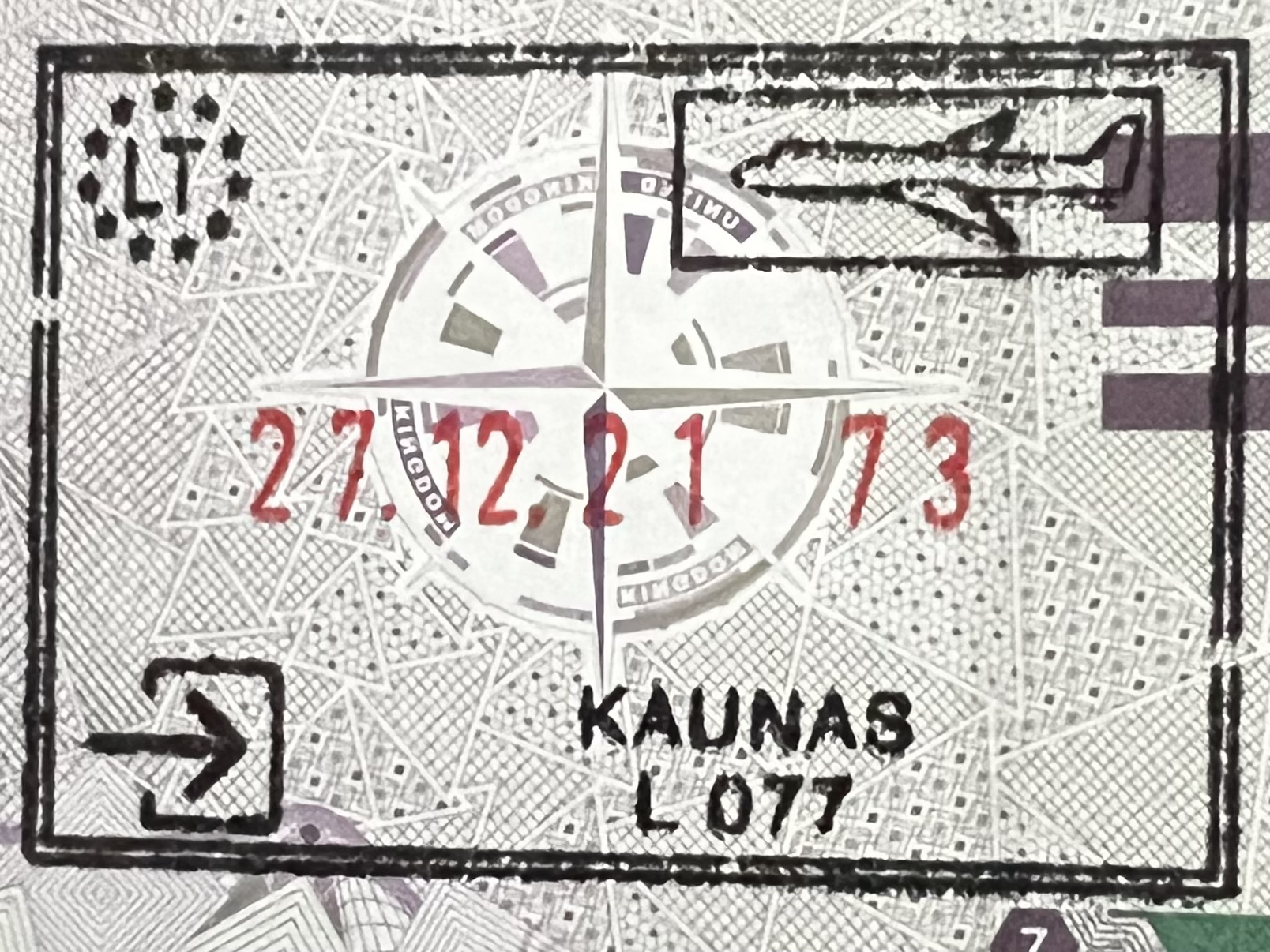
Immigration stamp at Kaunas Airport

=== Ownership ===
The airport is owned and operated by the State-owned enterprise Kauno Aerouostas, and is fully governable to the Ministry of Transport and Communications. In May 2013, the Government announced about the plans to merge Vilnius, Kaunas and Palanga airports into one company and the plans were approved by the Lithuanian parliament in November 2013. The merger took place in 2014.

=== Operations ===
Ryanair is the main passenger carrier at the airport, and has gradually expanded its network there since 2005 when the airline first landed at the airport. In 2010, Kaunas Airport became the first airline's base in Eastern Europe and this resulted a more-than-doubled-route network expansion at the airport. The airport reported 77% growth in passenger traffic that year and also won the EURO ANNIES 2011 prize awarded by a weekly aviation e-journal anna.aero as being the fastest-growing airport in Europe in the category of under one million passengers.

=== Catchment area ===
Almost a quarter of all passenger flow at the airport are travellers from the neighbouring countries Latvia, Belarus and Poland.

== Infrastructure ==
=== Runway and apron ===
Theoretical runway average capacity, when aircraft are landing or taking off, is 12 operations per hour. A new taxiway to improve the runway system was built in 2009. Further taxiway improvement works started in June 2013, expanding the southern part of the airport to construct a new 190 m (623 ft)-long and 23.2 m (76 ft)-broad runway by the end of 2014.

=== Maintenance facilities ===
Ryanair operates its own maintenance hangar at Kaunas Airport, which launched operations in January 2013. It can accommodate one aircraft at a time and performs C-type maintenance checks. The same year Ryanair has set to double its MRO capabilities at the airport and began construction of the second hangar in Kaunas.

FL Technics has announced its plans to invest almost 4 million US dollars into high-tech aircraft maintenance equipment at its newly launched MRO hangar in Kaunas. The latest equipment will support FL Technics MRO centre in servicing both narrow and wide body modern aircraft, including Boeing 747 and Boeing 787 Dreamliner. Following the full implementation, of the investment strategy, the new FL Technics base in Kaunas will create almost 300 new jobs, including over 200 places for aircraft mechanics, engineers and other aviation technical personnel.

== Airlines and destinations ==
The following airlines operate regular scheduled and charter flights at Kaunas Airport:

Airlines	Destinations
FLYYO	Seasonal charter: Tel Aviv
Freebird Airlines	Seasonal charter: Antalya
Ryanair	Alicante, Bari, Belfast–International, Bergamo, Bristol, Cologne/Bonn, Copenhagen, Dublin, Edinburgh, Liverpool, London–Luton, London–Stansted, Málaga, Paphos, Shannon, Stockholm–Arlanda; Seasonal: Burgas Charleroi, Gothenburg, Madrid, Naples, Palma de Mallorca, Pescara, Pisa, Rimini, Rhodes, Zadar
SkyUp	Seasonal charter: Heraklion
Wizz Air	London–Luton

== Statistics ==
The passenger traffic changes in late 2011 and early 2012 at Kaunas Airport are associated with the rivalry between Ryanair and Wizzair. As a response to the Wizzair's new base established at Vilnius Airport in Spring 2011, the Irish low-cost carrier moved Girona and Milan Bergamo routes from Kaunas to Vilnius in late 2011. In November 2012, Ryanair further cut route geography from Kaunas, by transferring Brussels Charleroi, Leeds, Liverpool, London Luton and Oslo Rygge to Vilnius, leaving only four routes available from Kaunas for the entire winter 2012/13 season. Some of the routes were restored in Summer 2013, including seasonal destinations.

Traffic numbers at Kaunas Airport
Year	Passengers handled	Passenger % change	Cargo (tonnes)	Cargo % change	Aircraft movements	Aircraft % change
2000	19,202	Steady	6,771	Steady	4,190	Steady
2001	20,137	▲4.9	9,517	▲40.6	4,409	▲5.2
2002	19,891	▼1.2	8,478	▼10.9	3,957	▼10.3
2003	21,732	▲9.3	6,673	▼21.3	4,077	▲3.0
2004	27,113	▲24.8	3,569	▼46.5	4,832	▲18.5
2005	77,350	▲185.3	4,308	▲20.7	4,611	▼4.6
2006	248,228	▲220.9	6,862	▲59.3	4,865	▲5.5
2007	390,881	▲57.5	6,816	▼0.7	6,089	▲25.2
2008	410,000	▲4.9	3,400	▼50.1	5,698	▼6.4
2009	456,698	▲11.4	2,113	▼37.9	6,027	▲5.8
2010	809,732	▲77.3	4,449	▲110.6	8,753	▲45.2
2011	872,618	▲7.8	4,221	▼5.1	9,168	▲4.7
2012	830,268	▼4.9	3,364	▼20.3	8,559	▼6.6
2013	695,509	▼16.2	2,112	▼37.2	7,312	▼14.6
2014	724,315	▲4.14	2,060	▼2.45	7,191	▼1.65
2015	747,284	▲3.17	4,703	▲128.30	7,438	▲3.43
2016	740,540	▼0.9	2,488	▼47.1	7,622	▲2.20
2017	1,186,074	▲37.56	3,365	▲26.0	11,731	▲35.03
2018	1,011,067	▼14.76	2,330	▼30.8	9,453	▼19.41
2019	1,160,591	▲14.78	3,196	▲37.2	9,888	▲4.6
2020	368,645	▼68				
2021	487,532	▲32				

- List of the busiest airports in the Baltic states

=== Most frequent routes ===
Top 5 most frequent routes from Kaunas as of August 2022
Rank	City	Flights per week
1	London Luton	~13
2	Copenhagen	~12
3	London Stansted	~5
4	Dublin	~5
5	Cologne Bonn	~5

=== Busiest routes ===
Top 19 busiest routes from Kaunas in 2024
Rank	Airport	Passengers	Airlines
1	London–Luton	258,357	Ryanair, Wizz Air
2	Copenhagen	137,783	Ryanair
3	London–Stansted	100,364	Ryanair
4	Stockholm–Arlanda	79,985	Ryanair
5	Dublin	76,875	Ryanair
6	Alicante	64,529	Ryanair
7	Liverpool	54,733	Ryanair
8	Málaga	51,866	Ryanair
9	Edinburgh	45,830	Ryanair
10	Shannon	42,000	Ryanair
11	Bristol	40,811	Ryanair
12	Berlin	38,177	Ryanair
13	Paphos	38,074	Ryanair
14	Bergamo	37,818	Ryanair
15	Charleroi	32,799	Ryanair
16	Bratislava	31,939	Ryanair
17	Rimini	30,975	Ryanair
18	Madrid	30,935	Ryanair
19	Cologne/Bonn	30,732	Ryanair

== Ground transportation ==
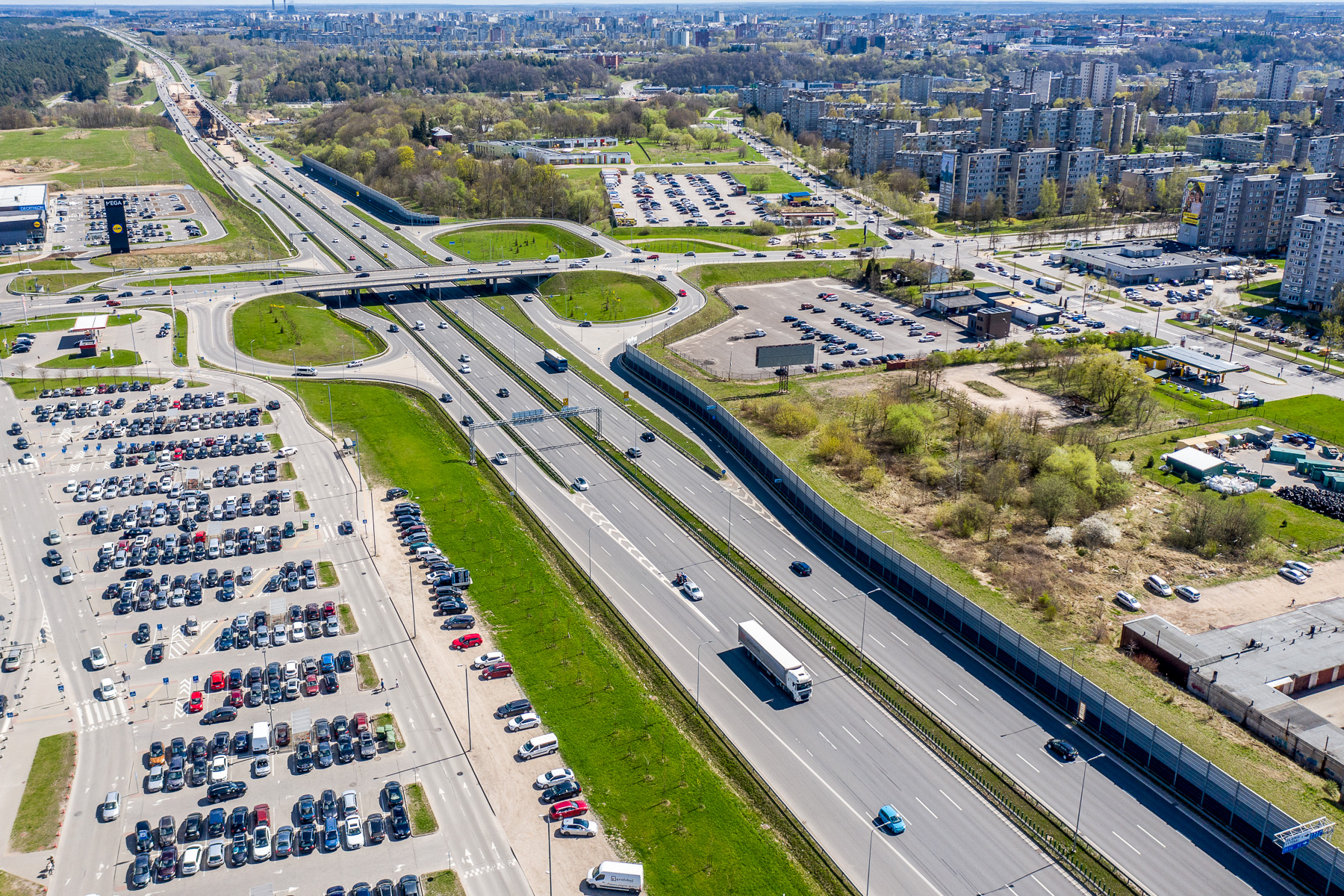
Motorway A1 near Kaunas

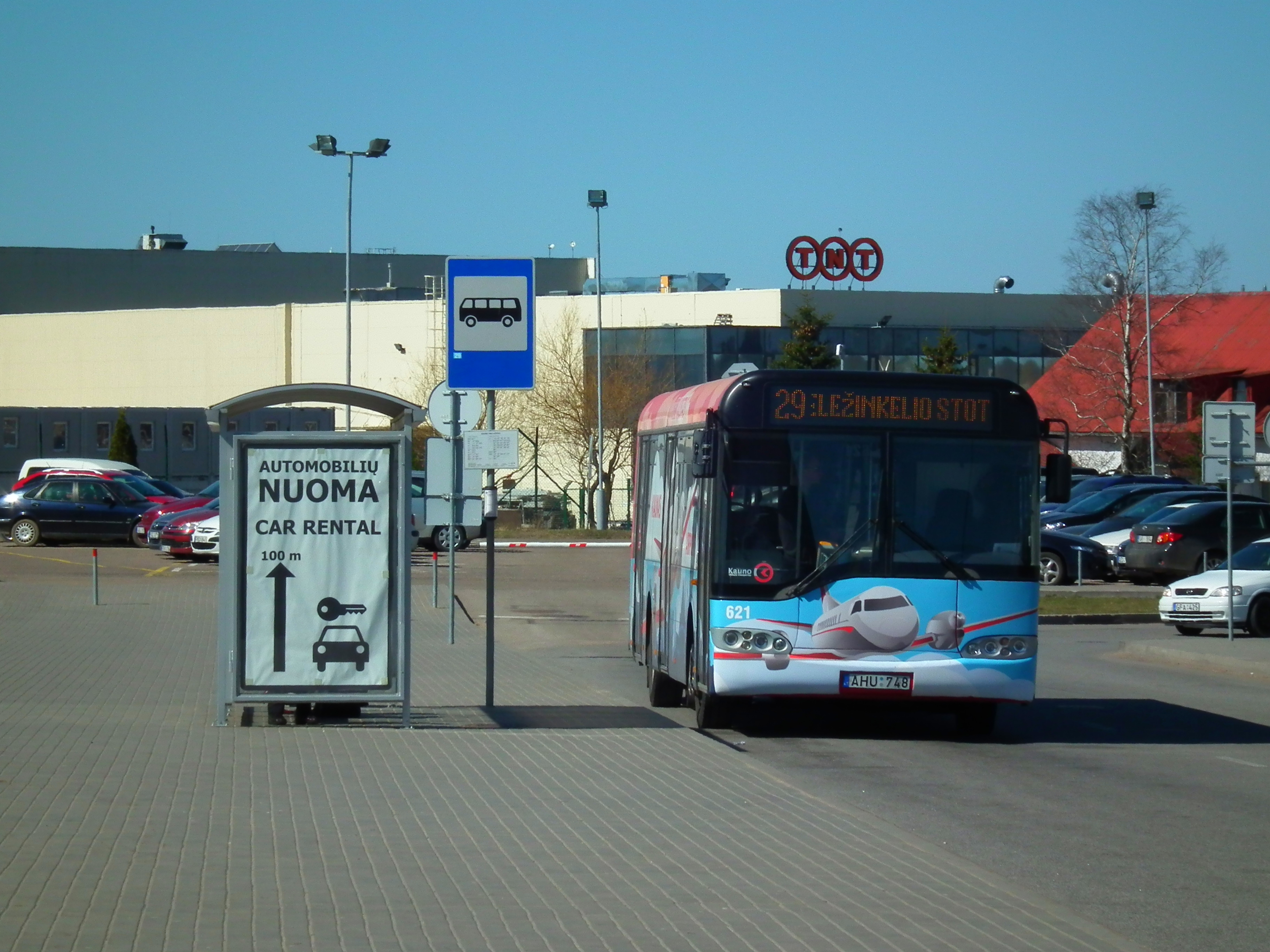
A bus stop at Kaunas Airport

=== Motorway ===
Due to its central location in Lithuania, Kaunas Airport is easily accessible via the nearby A6 highway/E262, which connects to the other main motorways in Lithuania, the A1 motorway (Lithuania) and Via Baltica (E67). Taxis take around 25 minutes to get to the city centre.

== Other facilities ==
The airpark is a territory of Kaunas Free Economic Zone adjacent to Kaunas Airport (3 km (1.9 mi) border).

== See also ==
- List of the busiest airports in the Baltic states
- List of the busiest airports in Europe
- List of the busiest airports in the former Soviet Union
- Transport in Lithuania
