= Avion Express Brasil =

Brazilian airline

IATA	ICAO	Call sign
Z3	AEB	AVION EXPRESS
- Founded: April 19, 2023; 3 years ago
- Commenced operations: TBA
- AOC #: 16,474/SPO - February 27, 2025
- Hubs: TBA
- Fleet size: 1
- Parent company: Avion Express
- Headquarters: Indaiatuba, Brazil
- Key people: Esteban Jauregui Lorda (CEO); Paulo Tarter (COO); Ruy Carlos Nogueira Lotz (CTO)
- Website: avionexpress.aero

Avion Express Brasil is a Brazilian startup airline, ACMI and aircraft leasing operator headquartered in São Paulo. The airline is a subsidiary of Lithuanian Avion Express and part of an Ireland-based and Lithuanian-owned group Avia Solutions Group. The intention of the new airline is, like the parent company, to carry out charter flights for tourism agencies, cargo and mainly to meet the growing demand for ACMI leases for airlines in Latin America.

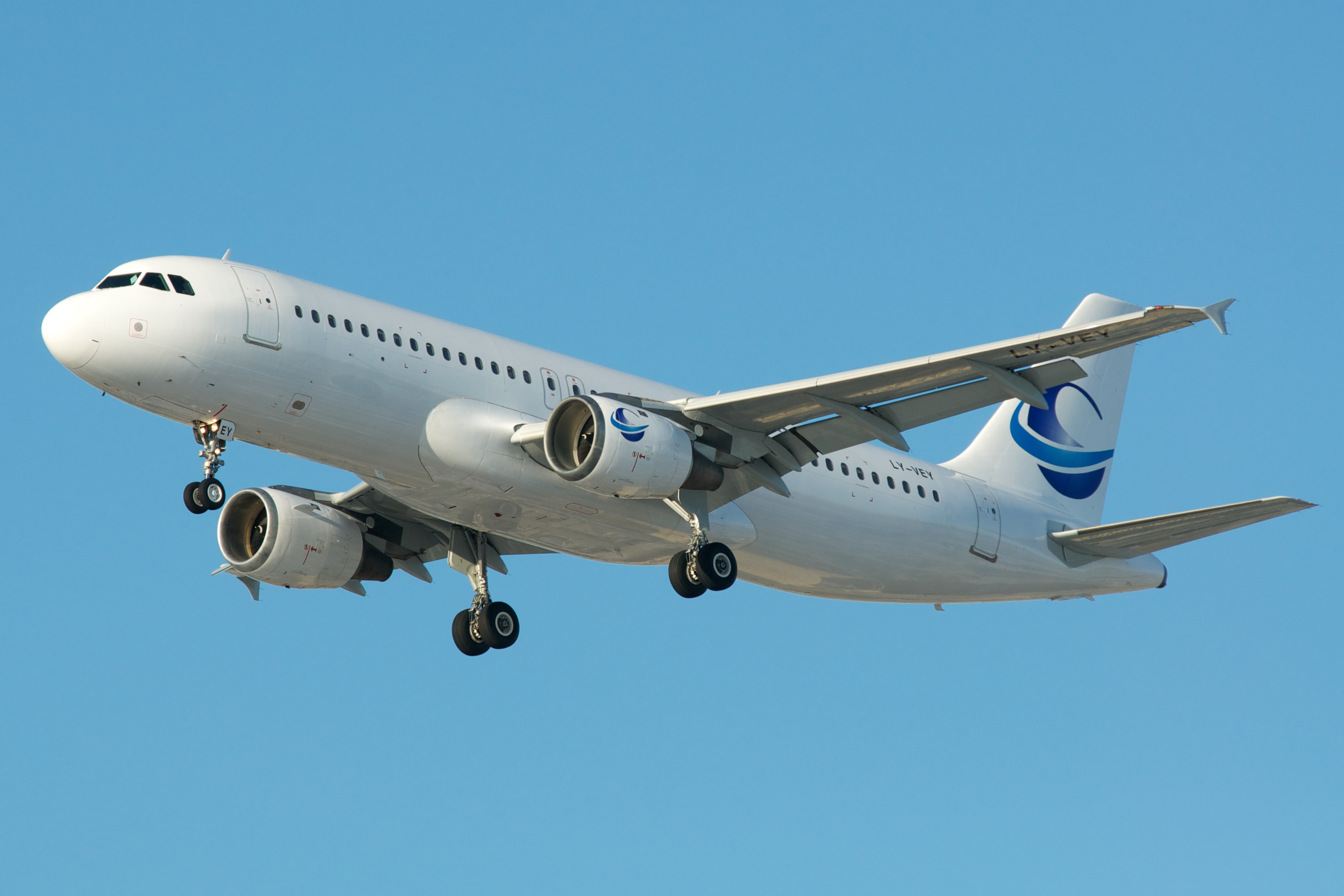
Airbus A320 from its parent company Avion Express

== History ==
=== Establishment (2023-present) ===
The creation of the new Brazilian airline was announced on April 19, 2023, by the chief executive officer (CEO) of Avion Express, Darius Kajokas, through a publication on his personal profile on the social network LinkedIn, immediately announcing the hiring of an chief operating officer (COO) and a chief technical officer (CTO) to assist in the Avion Express Brasil certification process before the National Civil Aviation Agency of Brazil (ANAC).

According to the executive, the airline will be based in São Paulo and will operate a fleet of Airbus A320 narrow-body aircraft, offering cargo and passenger flights. The new airline's operations are expected to begin with 5 aircraft, with the ambition to increase the Avion Express Brasil fleet to up to 25 aircraft by 2028. This fleet will include Airbus A321F planes, which will support the company's freight operations, added.

In an interview with the specialized aviation portal ch-aviation, Kajokas indicated that he hoped to obtain the air operator's certificate (AOC) from Avion Express Brasil in the fourth quarter of 2023, but in a realistic scenario, due to bureaucracy, this should only happen in the first or second half of 2024. He also refused, at that time, to specify whether the new airline will have São Paulo Guarulhos International Airport or São Paulo Congonhas Airport as its hub.

Although Avion Express has firmly established itself in Europe, the executive also highlighted that the decision to launch a subsidiary in Brazil is in line with plans to expand to other markets, such as Latin America and Southeast Asia, highlighting the size of the Brazilian market as a key factor in choosing the country to establish the group's new airline. This strategic decision is also aligned with the initiatives launched by the Brazilian Government through (ANAC) to encourage the entry of foreign airlines into the Brazilian market within the scope of the "Voo Simples" (Simple Flight, in English) and 'Fly2Brazil' initiatives, which facilitate and speed up the processes for obtaining an air operator's certificate.

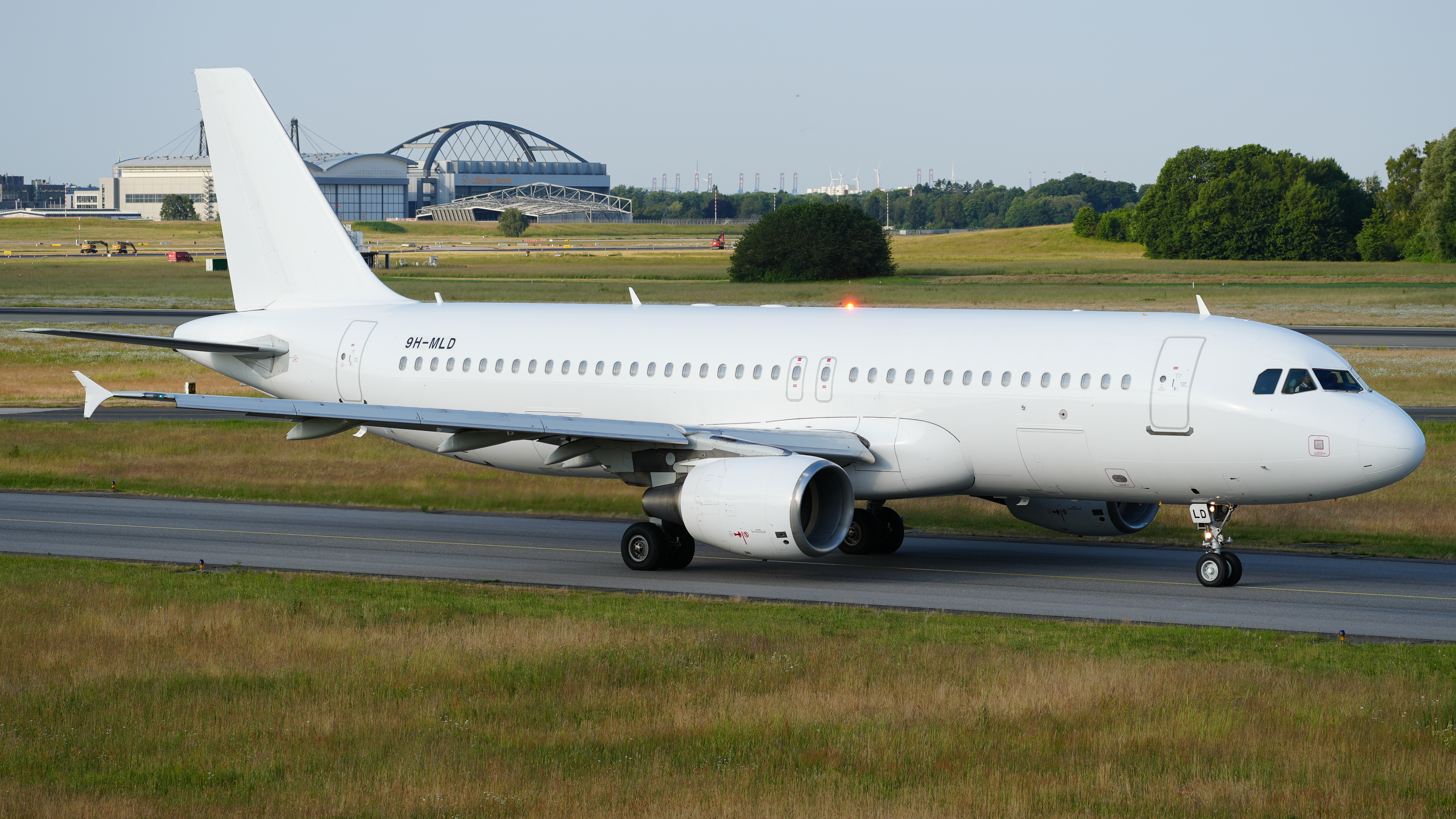
Former Airbus A320 registration 9H-MLD, the first aircraft of Avion Express Brasil

On December 28, 2023, through its website, Avion Express confirmed that it officially started its process to obtain the AOC in Brazil and the hiring of two Brazilian executives who will head Avion Express Brasil, Paulo Tarter as COO and Ruy Carlos Nogueira Lotz as CTO. The expectation is to obtain certification and begin operations in the third quarter of 2024.

On February 8, 2024, the Brazilian aviation portal AeroIN, citing sources close to Avion Express, confirmed the arrival of the first of five Airbus A320s in Brazil in June, when certification flights will begin, the last process in the stage for receive the green light from the aeronautical authorities to begin operating in the country. All of the first five planes will come from Avia Solutions Group, which owns Avion Express, SmartLynx Airlines and KlasJet.

On March 29, 2024, Avion Express Brasil reserved the Brazilian aeronautical registration PR-NVN for its first Brazilian-registered aircraft, a 13-year-old Airbus A320 (MSN 4448) which will be transferred from parent company Avion Express to Brazil in the second quarter of 2024 to begin certification flights for the new airline, the last step before obtaining its AOC.

On May 28, 2024, the start-up Avion Express Brasil announced its entry into the Latin American & Caribbean Air Transport Association (ALTA) as a member airline, joining several air transport companies in the region to contribute to the development and strengthening of air transport in Latin America and the Caribbean.

On July 1, 2024, Avion Express Brasil announced Esteban Jauregui Lorda, former executive of Aerolíneas Argentinas, Avianca and also Brazilian GOL Linhas Aéreas, as its new chief executive officer (CEO). According to the airline, under the leadership of Jauregui Lorda, it will establish itself in Brazil and expand its operations throughout the Americas, exploring new business opportunities through the ACMI market.

On November 11, 2024, Avion Express Brasil announced its entry into the fourth and penultimate stage of its certification process before the National Civil Aviation Agency (ANAC). The next and last step will be the certification flights. According to the CEO of the airline, Esteban Jauregui Lorda, the company is expected to be certified in early 2025, when they will start offering ACMI services to other airlines.

On November 18, 2024, Avion Express Brasil received its first aircraft, the Airbus A320 registration PR-MLD (MSN 3601). The aircraft was transferred between Spain and Brazil, landing in São José dos Campos, where it will undergo its nationalization process before beginning the new airline's certification flights. The aircraft was transferred from parent company Avion Express and is configured with 180 seats in a single class.

== Fleet ==
=== Current fleet ===
As of August 2025, Avion Express Brasil operates the following aircraft:

Avion Express Brasil fleet
Aircraft	In service	Orders	Passengers	Note
Airbus A320	1	4	180	All transferred from Avion Express
TOTAL	1	4		

=== Gallery ===
Avion Express Brasil current fleet

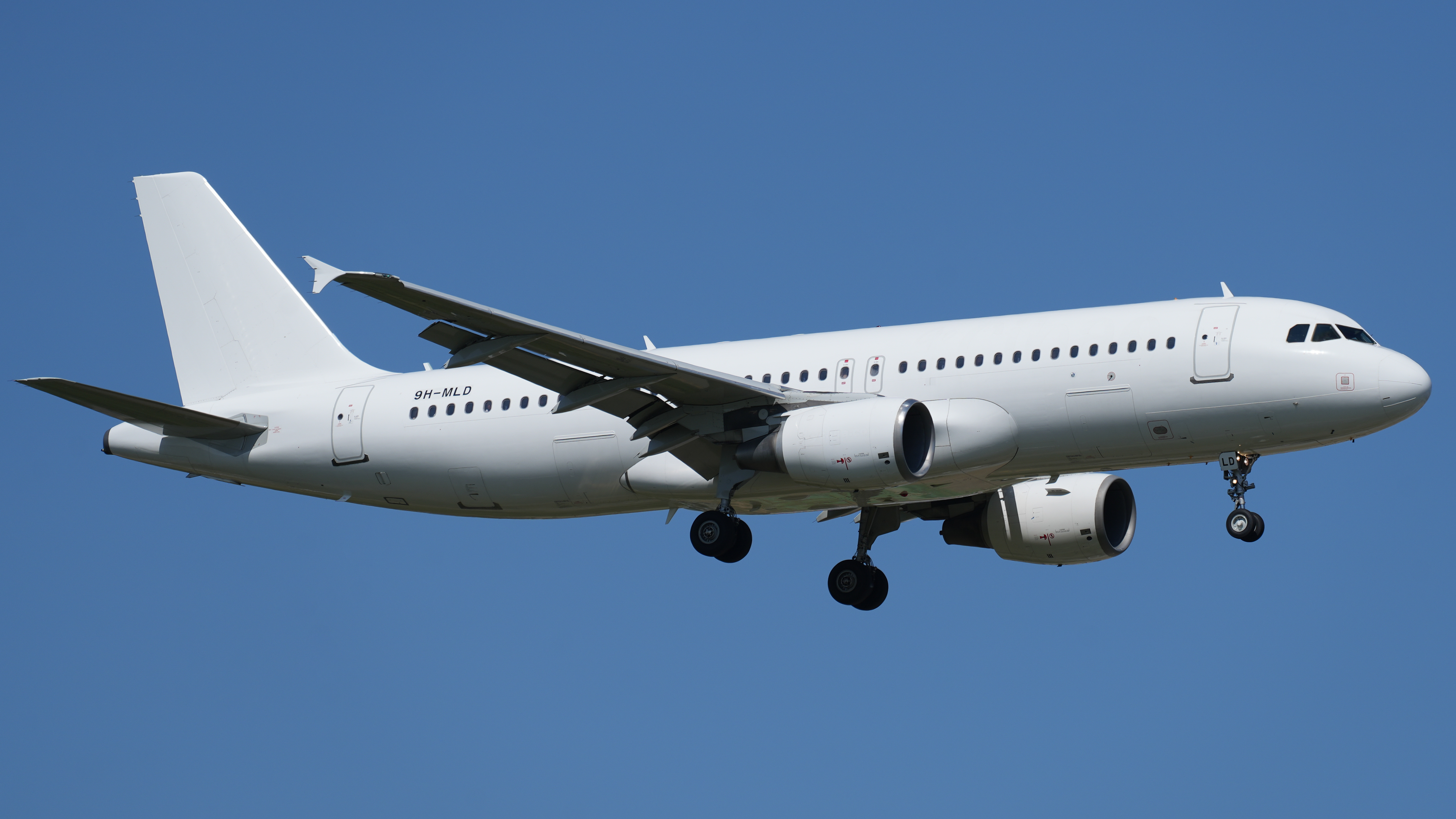
Airbus A320

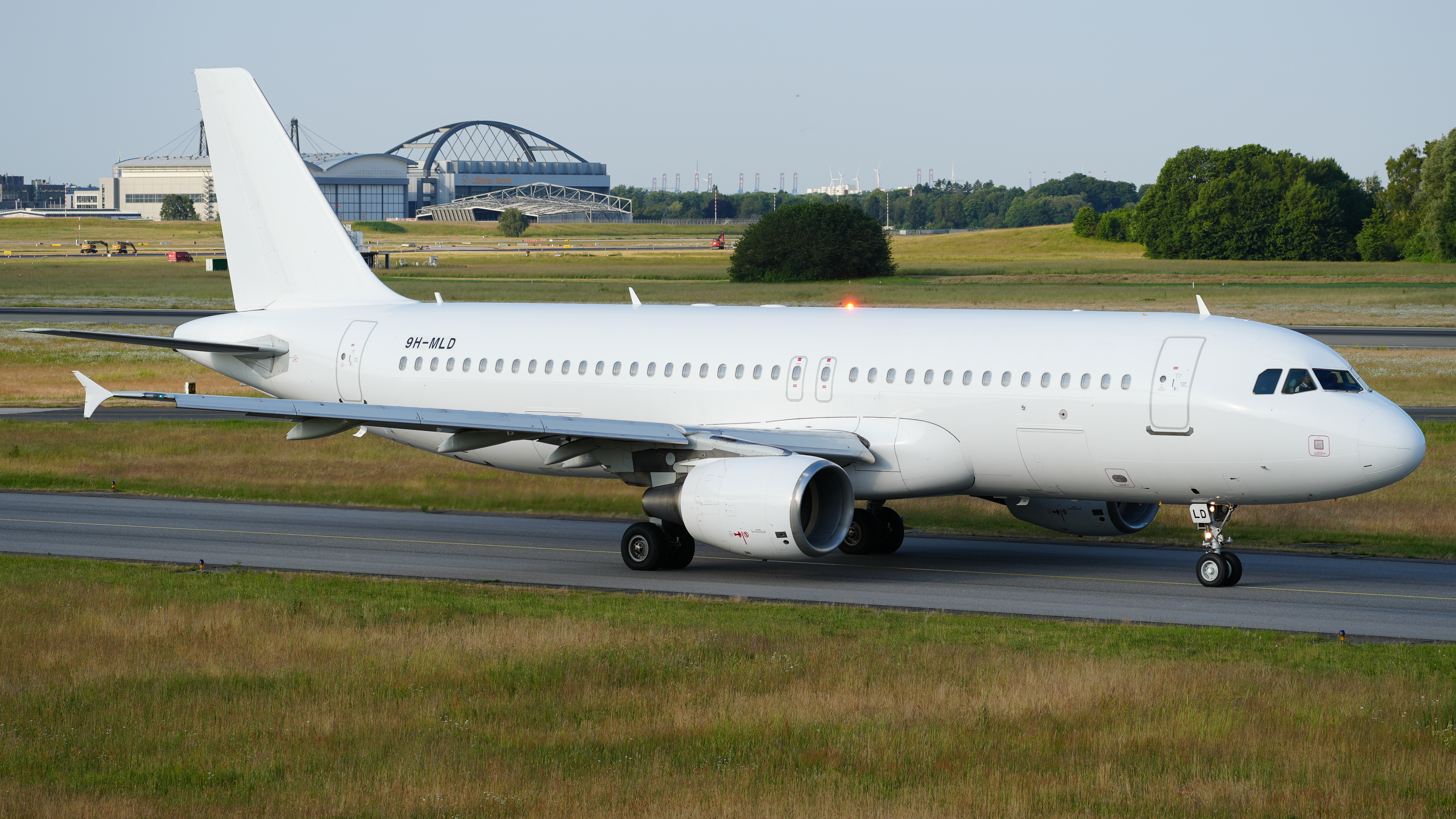
Airbus A320

== See also ==
- List of airlines of Brazil
