= AviaAM =

Global aviation holding company

AviaAM Leasing Service Centre AB
- Company type: Private
- Industry: Aviation leasing
- Founded: February 2007
- Headquarters: Dublin, Ireland
- Number of locations: 5 countries
- Area served: Worldwide
- Key people: Tadas Goberis (CEO and Chairman of the Board)
- Services: Aircraft Leasing; Aircraft Trading; Consulting Services; Asset Management; Engine Leasing
- Website: www.aviaam.com

AviaAM Leasing is a global aviation holding company engaged in commercial aircraft acquisition, leasing and sales. In June 2013, the company’s shares were admitted for trading on the Warsaw Stock Exchange (WSE). It was the biggest public offering of a foreign company in Poland year to date (PLN 112 m).

== Timeline ==
- Avia Asset Management AB was founded in February 2007, by Avia Solutions Group, an international, previously publicly traded aviation holding company with almost 100 offices and production facilities worldwide.
- In the autumn of 2011, Avia Asset Management AB together with related companies formed an aviation holding company AviaAM Leasing.
- In June 2013, AviaAM Leasing launched an Initial public offering on the Warsaw Stock Exchange (WSE).
- In 2018, the company shares were delisted from Warsaw Stock Exchange.
- In May 2016, AviaAM Leasing formed a joint venture aircraft leasing company with Henan Civil Aviation Investment Company (HNCA) called AviaAM Financial Leasing China.
- In August 2020, AviaAM Leasing entered cargo business by acquiring Boeing 747-400F nose-loader.
- In October 2022, AviaAM Leasing was announced as the launch customer of Mammoth Freighters, a Boeing Licensee for the Boeing 777, for brand new 777-300ERMF freighter conversion.
- In 2013, AviaAM B04, part of the AviaAM Leasing Service Centre was merged into another group company AviaAM B05.
- In 2023, in a legal dispute concerning the failed purchase of a CRJ-200LR aircraft, AviaAM Leasing, was ordered by the Lithuanian Court to return an advance payment of approximately US$5.2 million to the Nigerian airline Hak Air.

== Aircraft fleet ==
AviaAM Leasing has a fleet of regional, narrow-body and wide-body aircraft. As of May 2024, asset includes: Airbus A320, Airbus A321, Boeing 737-300, Boeing 737-800, Boeing 747-400F, Boeing 777-300ER and Bombardier CRJ200 aircraft.

As of May 2024, AviaAM Leasing's assets include:

| Aircraft type | Number of aircraft on lease | Country of aircraft registration |
|---|---|---|
| CRJ 200LR | 3 | Lithuania (3) |
| CRJ 200LR Business Jets | 1 | Lithuania (1) |
| Boeing 737-300 | 1 | Lithuania (1) |
| Boeing 747-400F | 1 | Iceland (1) |
| Boeing 737-800 | 1 | Lithuania (1) |
| Boeing 737-800BCF | 4 | Lithuania (3), Indonesia (1) |
| Boeing 737-400 | 1 | Iceland (1) |
| Airbus A320-200 | 10 | Bermuda (10) |
| Airbus A321-200 | 3 | Bermuda (3) |
| Boeing 777-200ER | 1 | Singapore (1) |
| Boeing 777-300ER | 2 | USA (2) |
