= BAA Training Aviation Academy =

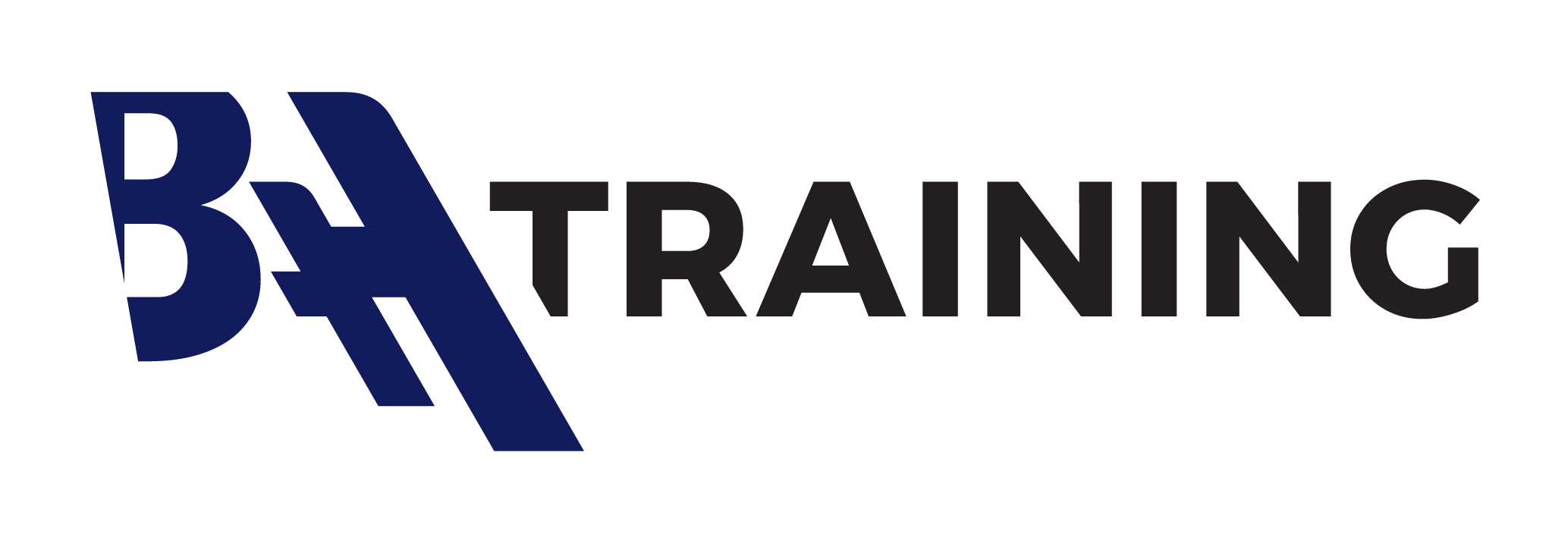
- Industry: Aviation
- Founded: 2006; 20 years ago in Vilnius, Lithuania
- Area served: EU; CIS; APAC; MENA
- Key people: Marijus Ravoitis (CEO)
- Services: Aviation training services: Fixed and Rotary wing Ab Initio; Type Rating; Cabin Crew; Flight Dispatcher
- Number of employees: ▲280 (2024)
- Parent: Avia Solutions Group
- Website: www.baatraining.com

BAA Training Aviation Academy is a global aviation training center founded in 2006 with offices in Spain, France, Lithuania and Vietnam. It offers a wide range of programs, including Ab Initio, Type Rating, Cabin Crew, and Flight Dispatcher training. BAA Training Aviation Academy operates 18 flight simulation training devices (FSTDs), including 5 full flight simulators (FFSs) at their training center in Vilnius, Lithuania, 3 FFSs in Ho Chi Minh City, Vietnam, 3 FFSs and 2 FTDs in Barcelona, Spain, as well as 4 FFSs and one FTD in Paris, France. Through an extensive partnership network of 69+ FFS in 29+ locations, BAA Training Aviation Academy is well-equipped to provide aviation training worldwide for various aircraft types. Based at Lleida-Alguaire International Airport in Spain, the Ab Initio school operates with a fleet of 9 Cessna 172S aircraft.

In 2023, the company expanded its fleet of pilot training aircraft by purchasing 48 Cessna 172 Skyhawk aircraft from Textron Aviation, making the largest pilot training base in Europe (in Spain).

== History ==
In 2006, the flyLAL Training Centre was established, fully owned by flyLAL Group. It provided training for B737CL and SAAB 2000 pilots and cabin crew.

In 2009, the academy changed its name to Baltic Aviation Academy as part of a new business strategy.

In 2012, Intelligent business management software, MOMook, designed specifically for aviation training centers, was introduced.

In 2015, Baltic Aviation Academy became BAA Training Aviation Academy. In 2016, the academy purchased an Airbus A320 touch screen trainer, enhancing flight training preparation on the full flight simulator and the first cadet program was launched. In 2018, BAA Training Aviation Academy purchased an Airbus A320 Door and Slide Trainer for cabin crew and pilot training. A BAA Training Vietnam training center in Ho Chi Minh City, Vietnam, was established. BAA Training Aviation Academy opened a new flight base in Lleida-Alguaire International Airport.

In 2021, the company opened a training facility in Spain and established an MRO in Spain called Avia Repair Co. It also secured €31 million financing was secured for global expansion. In the same year, the academy launched a new Boeing 737 MAX Type Rating Program, virtual reality-based pilot training and signed a long-term agreement with Bamboo Airways on full flight simulator leasing.

In 2022, the academy launched a new pilot training program in cooperation with ENAC and a new cadet program with a pilot job guarantee. BAA Training Aviation Academy also signed a contract to provide Air France with Airbus A320 Type Rating services.

In September 2023, BAA Training opened a new simulator training center in Paris following an agreement with Transavia Airlines, part of the Air France-KLM Group. Additionally, a consultancy center was opened in New Delhi, India, and became fully operational in September 2023.

In 2023, an order for 48 additional Cessna 172 Skyhawks was placed with Textron Aviation, with delivery expected in 2026.

In 2024, BAA Training became the sole provider of pilot training under the new Pilot Runway project.

=== Cadet Programs ===
As of 2024, BAA Training offers its own unique cadet programs with a job interview guarantee at two of its partner airlines. It also has a history of cadet programs with other operators, such as Small Planet Airlines, SmartLynx, Wizz Air, and Turkish Airlines. The vast majority of Wizz Air and Turkish Airlines cadets (182 in total) were employed by the respective airlines after the training.

Ab Initio
ATPL Integrated (to get a commercial pilot license – CPL)	16-18 months
ATPL Integrated Virtual (to get a commercial pilot license – CPL)	
Multi-Crew Pilot License (to get an MPL license)	24 months
CPL Modular (to get a CPL)	18-36 months
Airline cadet programs (to get a CPL) BAA Training cadet program Indian cadet program	18-22 months
PPL (to obtain a private pilot license – PPL)	7 months
PPL Virtual (to get a private pilot license – PPL)	
IFR	
Multi-Engine Piston Rating (MEP)	
NVFR	
Flight Instructor (FI)	
ATO Change	
Hours building	
Aviation English	

Type Rating		Qualification courses
Airbus A320	Type Rating	License conversion to EASA
Airbus A320	Type Rating (DGCA)	Zero Flight Time Training (ZFT)
Airbus A320	Cross Crew Qualification CCQ	Type Rating Refresher Training
ATR 42/72	Type Rating	APS MCC
ATR 42/72	Type Rating (DGCA)	Base training
ATR 72-600	Type Rating	Jet Orientation Course (JOC)
ATR 72-600	Type Rating (DGCA)	License Proficiency Check (LPC)
Boeing 737 CL + Difference to NG	Type Rating	Multi-Crew Cooperation (MCC)
Boeing 737 NG	Type Rating	Multi-Crew Cooperation Instructors (MCCI)
Boeing 737 NG	Type Rating (DGCA)	Synthetic Flight Instructor (SFI)
Boeing 757/767	Type Rating	Type Rating Instructor (TRI)
Boeing 777	Type Rating	Upset Prevention & Recovery Training (UPRT)
Boeing 747	Type Rating	
Boeing 737 MAX	Type Rating	
Boeing 737 MAX	Type Rating (DGCA)	
Boeing	Difference training (various options)	
Bombardier CRJ 100/200	Type Rating	
Bombardier CRJ 700/900	Type Rating	
Bombardier Dash Q8-400	Type Rating	
Embraer 135/145	Type Rating	
Embraer 170/190	Type Rating	

== Locations ==
=== Flight base in Lleida-Alguaire (Spain) ===
A flight base at Lleida-Alguaire International Airport in Spain ensures all-year-round student training.

=== BAA Training Lithuania ===
BAA Training Lithuania is the academy’s headquarters, a pilot ground school and a training center with four full flight simulators

=== BAA Training Vietnam ===
The subsidiary in Asia operates two full flight simulators along with other advanced training equipment, serving students from Vietnam and neighboring countries, such as Thailand, Cambodia and Malaysia.

BAA Training Spain

BAA Training Spain training center near Barcelona-El Prat Airport is home to 3 full flight simulators and two flight training devices.

BAA Training France

A training facility near Paris Orly Airport equipped with six simulator bays and four FFSs.
