= JETMS =

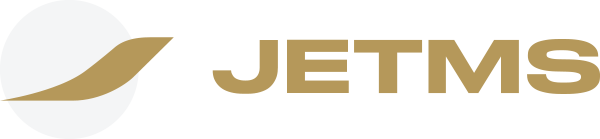
- Company type: Private
- Industry: Aviation
- Founded: 2007
- Headquarters: Biggin Hill Airport London, United Kingdom
- Key people: Stefan Chevalier (CEO) UK, Gintaras Juknevicius (CEO) Lithuania
- Number of employees: 92 (2021)
- Parent: Avia Solutions Group
- Website: jetms.aero

JETMS is a global provider of aircraft interior solutions, providing services including customized monuments, lounges, bars, sky shops, seat modules, galleys, and stowages.

== Overview ==
The company was founded in 2007 and is a part of Avia Solutions Group – a global aerospace business group provides capacity solutions for passenger and cargo airlines worldwide. The Group manages over 100 offices and production facilities worldwide and employs over 10 000 professionals of aviation and other industries and serves more than 2 000 clients across 5 continents.

JETMS Core Business Lines:

- Commercial Aircraft Interiors
- VIP Jets Interiors
- In-House Design Solutions
- Special Missions Projects

== History ==
- In 2007 the company was founded under the name of FL Technics Jets.
- In 2013 the company became the first authorized center in Eastern Europe to provide warranty services to Tronair ground handling equipment.
- In 2015 the company became an authorized partner of Rockwell Collins.
- In 2015 the company was renamed to Jet Maintenance Solutions.
- In 2018 the sales of the Avia Solutions Group's Aircraft Maintenance and Repair Business Segment grew 16% to $157.5 million.
- In 2019 Jet Maintenance Solutions became one of the first MROs worldwide to provide 7800 landings inspection for Bombardier CL604.
- In 2021 Jet Maintenance Solutions rebranded to JETMS.
- In March 2021, JETMS acquired London based RAS Group consisting of Ras Completions Limited and RAS Interiors Limited.
- In 2021, JETMS launched a new line maintenance station located at Nice Côte d’Azur Airport in France.
- In Sep 2021, JETMS receives new Maintenance Organisation Approval Certificate (MOAC) issued by the United Kingdom Civil Aviation Authority (CAA) to conduct base and line MRO services on Embraer EMB135/145 aircraft.
- In March 2022, JETMS' subsidiary Ras Group has rebranded to JETMS Completions.
- in August 2022, JETMS Completions receives FAA approval for Embraer 505 seat maintenance and modification.

== Capabilities ==
JETMS holds the below certifications:

- UK CAA Part 21G (POA)
- UK CAA Part 21J (DOA)
- UK CAA Part 145
- EASA Part 145
- ASA-100 & FAA AC 00-56B
