= Ascend Airways Malaysia =

Malaysian charter airline

Ascend Airways Malaysia Sdn Bhd
IATA	ICAO	Call sign
AU	AXN (2024) AYG	ASTRA
- Founded: April 1, 2024
- Commenced operations: November 2025; 9 months ago
- Operating bases: Kuala Lumpur International Airport
- Fleet size: 2
- Destinations: Charter & ACMI
- Parent company: Avia Solutions Group
- Headquarters: Kuala Lumpur Sentral station, Kuala Lumpur
- Key people: Alastair Willson (Director)
- Website: ascendairwaysmy.aero

Ascend Airways Malaysia is Malaysian ACMI (Aircraft, Crew, Maintenance, and Insurance) and charter airline headquartered in Kuala Lumpur, Malaysia. It is a subsidiary of Avia Solutions Group. It specialised in providing wet-lease capacity for other Malaysia-based airlines, tour operators, and government departments.

== History ==
=== Establishment (2024-present) ===
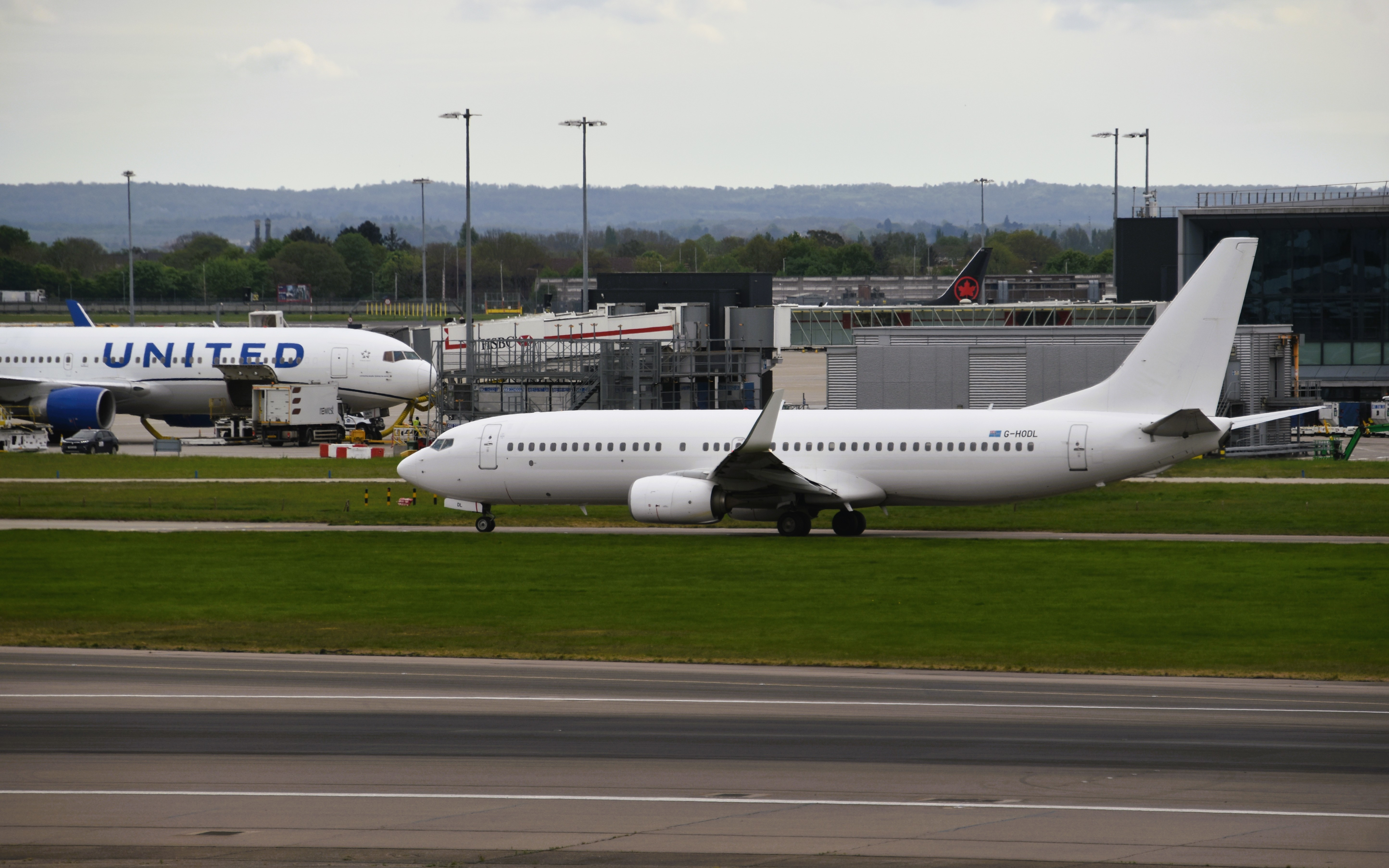
Former Ascend Airways, later convert to the airline

Ascend Airways Malaysia was registered in April 2024, in November, Ascend Airways Malaysia received conditional approval for Air Services Permit (ASP) from the Malaysian Aviation Commission (Mavcom) valid from 15 November 2024 to 14 November 2025. It formerly leased VIP 737-300 (LV-CHF) from KlasJet

In October 2025, Civil Aviation Authority of Malaysia has officially given its Air Operator Certificate (AOC), this allowing the airline to started operation as cargo service on November 2025. The airline made its first flight from Kuala Lumpur to Labuan on 1 December 2025.

The airline received another Boeing 737-800 which previously from Turkish-airline Pegasus Airlines, registration 9M-ASG. Civil Aviation Authority of Malaysia approved after proving their first passenger flight.

== Fleet ==
The Ascend Airways Malaysia fleet consisted of the following aircraft:

Ascend Airways Malaysia fleet
Aircraft	In service	Orders	Notes
Boeing 737-800	1	—	
Boeing 737-800SF	1	—	
Total	2	—	
