= Avia Solutions Group =

Global aerospace business group in Ireland

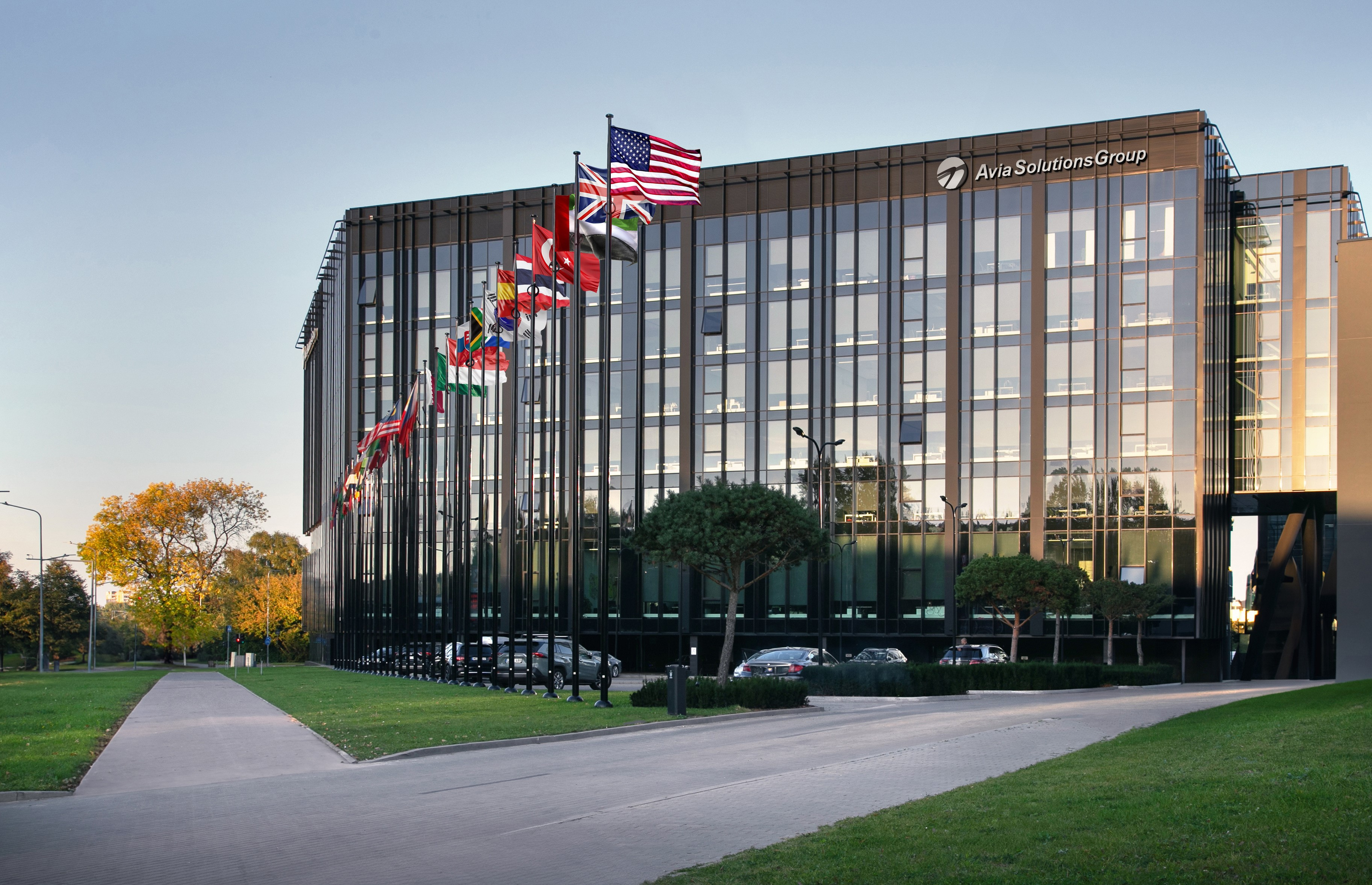
- Avia Solutions Group's service center in Vilnius
- Type: Private company
- Industry: Aviation, tourism
- Founded: 2010; 16 years ago
- Headquarters: Dublin, Ireland
- Key people: Gediminas Žiemelis (chairman of the board); Zilvinas Lapinskas (CEO)
- Revenue: €2.263 billion (2023)
- Operating income: €160 million (2023)
- Number of employees: 11 000+ (2023)
- Rating: Fitch Ratings – BB; S&P Global Ratings – BB-
- Website: www.aviasg.com

Avia Solutions Group is a Lithuanian-owned ACMI (aircraft, crew, maintenance, and insurance) provider and holding company. Established in 2010 in Vilnius, it moved its headquarters to Dublin in 2023, and has additional offices around the world. As of January 2024, the company maintained a fleet of over 200 aircraft among the group's subsidiaries, with annual revenue of €2 billion.

== History ==
The history of Avia Solutions Group began in 2005 when Air Lithuania (LAL), the national airline of Lithuania, was privatized. LAL's investment management acquired 100% of the airline shares for 7.53 million euros. The airline was re-branded as FlyLAL and several related companies were registered, including Baltic Ground Services (ground handling), FL Technics (aviation maintenance, repair, and operations), and Bilietų Pardavimo Centras (travel agency). In 2005, FL Technics was founded. The company opened its first hangar at Vilnius International Airport. In November 2006, Baltic Aviation Academy (now known as BAA Training) was founded, to provide professional training for aviation specialists. In 2007, JetMS was founded under the name FL Technics Jets. In 2007, Aviation Asset Management was founded (now known as AviaAM Leasing). In 2008, a charter airline called Small Planet Airlines was founded.

In 2010, the LAL companies were consolidated into Avia Solutions Group, and the group was listed on the Warsaw Stock Exchange in 2011, where it was listed until November 2018. In 2021, the group received €300 million in financing from US-based investment management company Certares. The company moved its headquarters from Lithuania to Cyprus, and then from Cyprus to Dublin in May 2023. The company is Ireland's second largest aviation business after Ryanair.

In 2024, Avia subsidiary Ascend Airways was granted an air operator's certificate (AOC); it operates from London Gatwick and Southend in England. In 2024, ASG announced plans to expand to the United States, partnering with Impact Investments, an investment firm headed by former US Secretary of State Mike Pompeo. The same year, the Icelandic Bluebird Nordic airline closed due to decreased demand for chartered cargo flights.

On November 12, 2024, Avia ordered 40 Boeing 737 Max 8 aircraft for delivery to its various ACMI (aircraft, crew, maintenance, and insurance) airlines from 2030, with an option for an additional 40. Distribution amongst the groups subsidiary airlines is yet to be confirmed.

The company inaugurated its first Global Services Center in Manila, the Philippines, in December 2024. It supports the technical, flight operations and MRO organizations of Avia Solutions Group.

In February 2025, Brasil's aviation authority (ANAC) awarded Avion Express Brasil with an AOC, becoming Brasil's first ACMI operator. Avion Express Brazil is a subsidiary of Avion Express, which itself is a division of Avia Solutions Group.

Skytrans, an Australian subsidiary of Avia Solutions Group, received its AOC in March 2025, allowing it to begin ACMI operations. As a result, Skytrans added an Airbus A319 to its fleet of aircraft. Two other subsidiaries of Avia Solutions Group received their AOC status in October 2025: Thai SmartLynx, making it the first Thailand-based ACMI airline, and Ascend Airways Malaysia, allowing it to begin operations in November 2025. That same year, Avia Solutions Group sold SmartLynx Latvia to a Dutch fund, and started reorganisation of the Maltese and Estonian operators into a separate brand.

In July 2026, the company named Zilvinas Lapinskas as its new chief executive.

== Business model ==
Avia Solutions Group is a holding company with subsidiaries specializing in various aircraft related businesses, including aircraft maintenance; repair and overhaul (MRO); leasing and trading of aircraft; ground handling and fueling; aviation training; personnel resourcing; and business and corporate aviation, in addition to its primary function as an ACMI provider. Among its notable subsidiaries are: Avion Express, Magma Aviation and KlasJet. Some of its customers include: Lufthansa, Turkish Airlines, Wizzair, Ryanair, the TUI Group, and SAS. The group also organizes humanitarian flights, airlifts, airdrops, search and rescue, evacuation and other aircraft leasing for the United Nations, world governments and other aid groups. The company flies about 6 million passengers per year, and has over 12,000 employees located in 100 offices around the world.

As of March 2024, the company owns twelve AOC-certified airlines, with a plan to purchase seven more within the year.

Gediminas Žiemelis is the founder, chairman and majority owner of the company, and Zilvinas Lapinskas is the CEO.

== Subsidiaries ==
As of 2024, Avia Solutions Group controls the following companies under the following business areas:

=== ACMI ===
- Avia Management Group Asia
- Arcus Air Logistics
- Ascend Airways Malaysia
- Asia Pacific Leasing
- Avion Express
- Avion Express Brasil
- Avion Express Malta
- BBN Airlines
- BBN Airlines Türkiye
- BBN Airlines Thailand
- KlasJet
- Magma Aviation
- Skytrans Australia

=== Aircraft Leasing ===
- AviaAM Leasing

=== Aviation Media and Events ===
- AeroTime
- Air Convention
- Seven Live!

=== Aviation Training ===
- Aeroclass.org
- AviationCV.com
- BAA Training Aviation Academy

=== Business and Corporate Aviation ===
- Biggin Hill FBO
- KlasJet

=== Cargo Aviation ===
- Arcus Air
- Magma Aviation

=== Charter Broker ===
- Chapman Freeborn
- Skyllence

=== Ground Handling ===
- Aviator
- BGS

=== MRO ===
- Chevron
- Flash Line Maintenance
- FL Technics
- Helisota
- JETMS
- Storm Aviation
- Wright International

=== Online Platforms ===
- Aeroclass.org
- Air Convention
- Locatory
- Momook
- Sensus Aero

=== Public Transport Solutions ===
- Busnex

=== Railway Freight ===
- BGS Rail
