= Bluebird Nordic =

Icelandic cargo airline

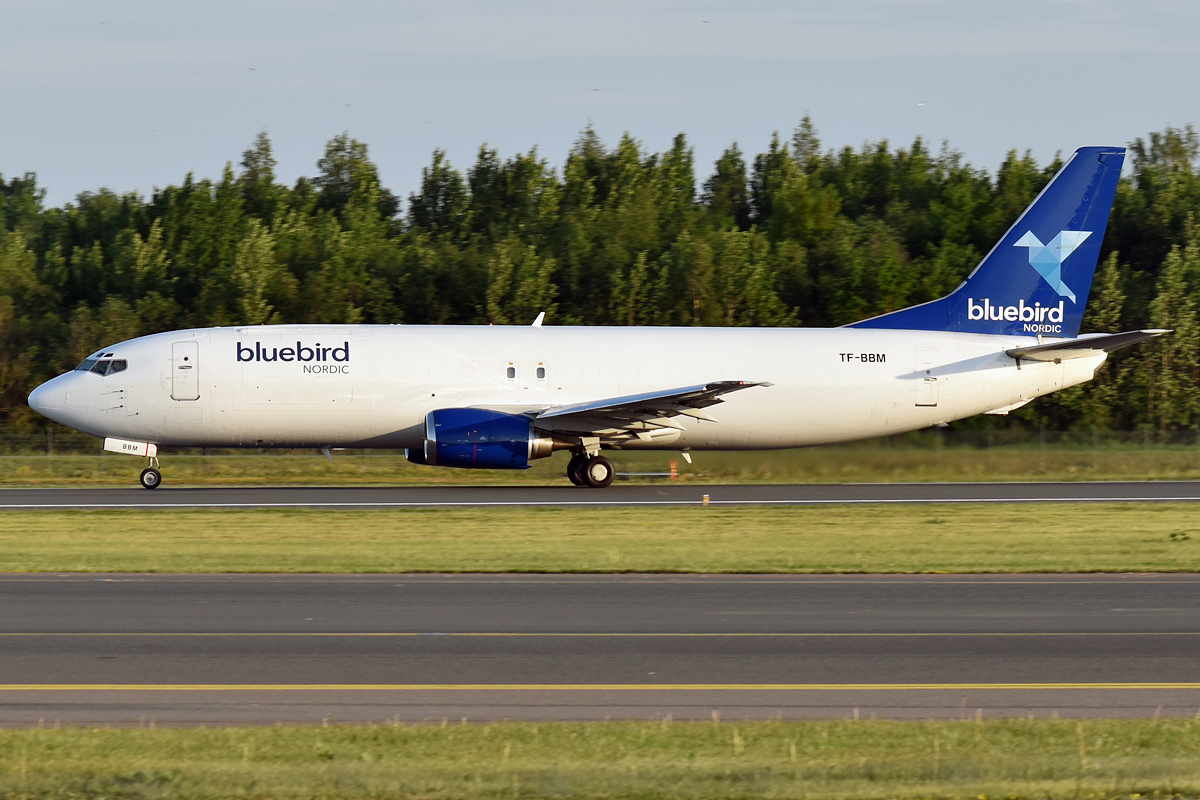
- Boeing 737-400F at Tallinn Airport in 2020
IATA	ICAO	Call sign
BO	BBD	BLUE CARGO
- Founded: 1999 as Bluebird Cargo
- Commenced operations: March 2001
- Ceased operations: 30 April 2024 as Bluebird Nordic
- Hubs: Keflavík International Airport
- Fleet size: 14
- Destinations: 3 (scheduled)
- Parent company: Avia Solutions Group
- Headquarters: Reykjavík, Iceland
- Key people: Audrone Keinyte, CEO
- Website: bluebird.is

Bluebird Nordic, formerly Bluebird Cargo, was a cargo airline based in Reykjavík, Iceland, operating scheduled and chartered cargo services to and from Iceland and within Europe out of its base at Keflavík International Airport, with a special focus on Liège Airport and East Midlands Airport as freight hubs.

== History ==
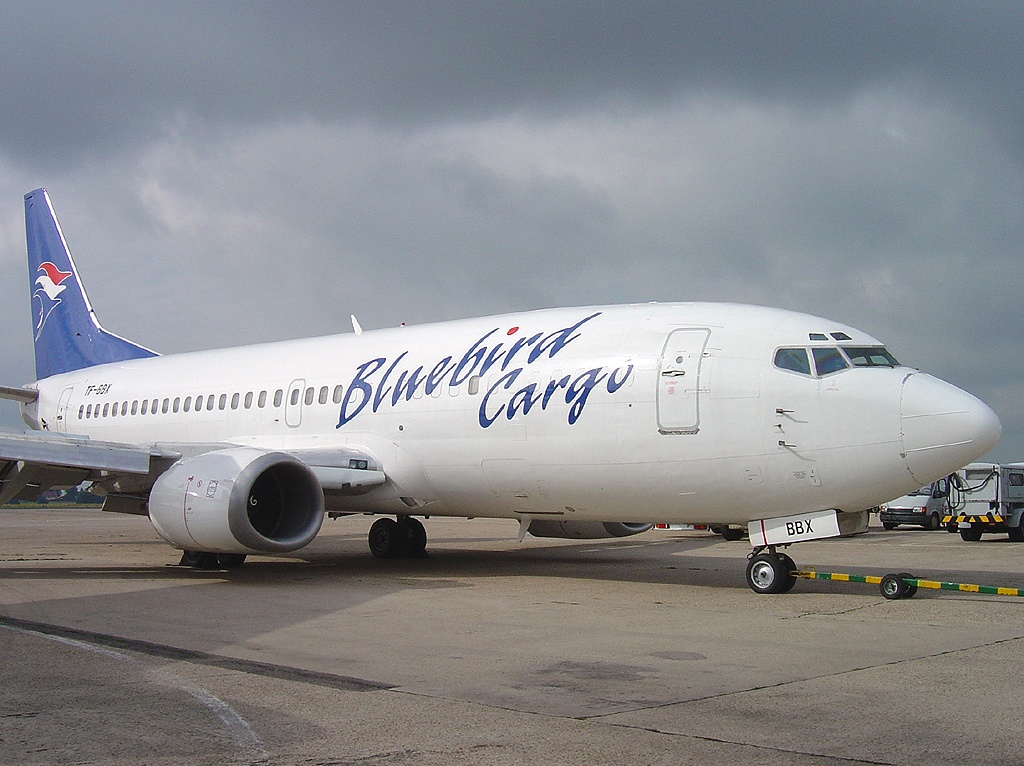
Boeing 737-300F

Bluebird Cargo was established in 1999 and started operations in March 2001. Operations began with daily freighter services between Iceland, the United Kingdom and Germany with a single Boeing 737-300F. In 2014, the airline was bought by Haru Holding and Steinn Logi Björnsson became its CEO. In late 2017, the company changed the corporate name to Bluebird Nordic, but was still owned by Icelandair Group. In January 2020, Avia Solutions Group acquired 100% of Bluebird Nordic.

In August 2021, the air carrier announced plans to increase its Boeing 737-800 fleet to 25 aircraft by 2024. On 4 January 2022, Bluebird Nordic acquired a second-hand Boeing 777-300ER. On 25 January, Bluebird Nordic acquired a 777-300ER, again a second-hand aircraft. In April, the ownership appointed Audrone Keinyte as new CEO.

Bluebird Nordic ceased operations on 30 April 2024 and returned all aircraft to their lessors.

== Destinations ==
As of February 2021, Bluebird Nordic operated freight services to the following scheduled destinations in addition to ad-hoc and charter services:

- Billund - Billund Airport
- Dublin – Dublin Airport
- Reykjavík – Keflavík International Airport, base

== Fleet ==
At the time of its cessation it operated three Boeing 737-400Fs and one Boeing 777-200F.
