= Magma Aviation =

Cargo airline

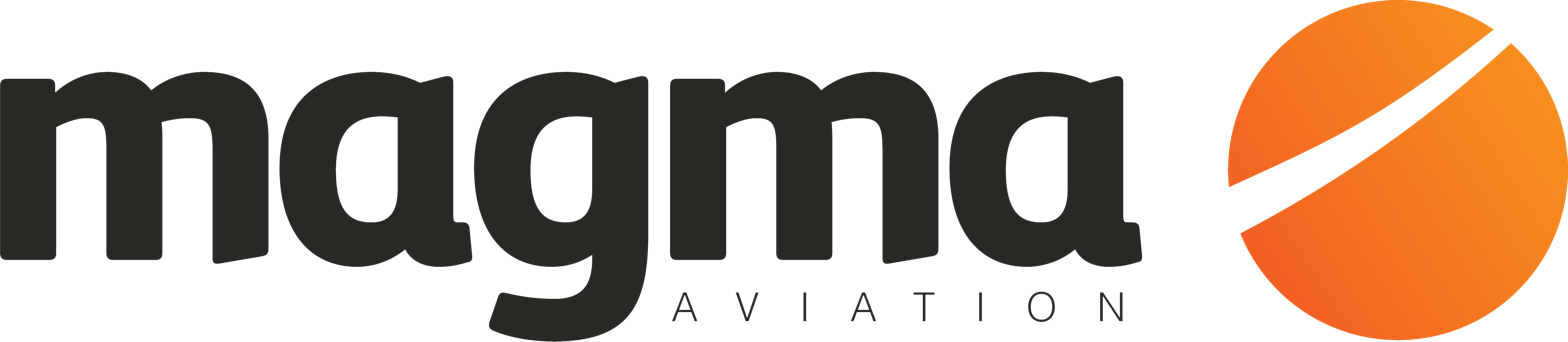

- Mamga Aviation Boeing 747-412F operated for Air Atlanta Icelandic
- Founded: December 2009
- Hubs: Frankfurt-Hahn Airport, Liège Airport
- Parent company: Avia Solutions Group
- Headquarters: Gatwick
- Website: magma-aviation.com

Magma Aviation is a European cargo handler specialising in charter and regular cargo services. Magma Aviation runs regular B747-400F services between cargo hubs in Europe to West and South Africa, as well as to North America. Magma Aviation operates worldwide with the main office located in London, United Kingdom.

== History ==
2009 – Magma Aviation is founded to commercially and operationally manage dedicated wide-body cargo aircraft, contracted on an exclusive basis from airline partners.

2017 – Chapman Freeborn increases its stake in Magma Aviation to a majority shareholding of 75%. The global aircraft charter specialist has held a minority holding in Magma since the company was launched.

2019 - Chapman Freeborn acquired by Avia Solutions Group, a global aviation holding company with subsidiaries engaged in aircraft maintenance, pilot training, ground handling and fuelling, aviation IT solutions, and business aviation.

== Fleet ==
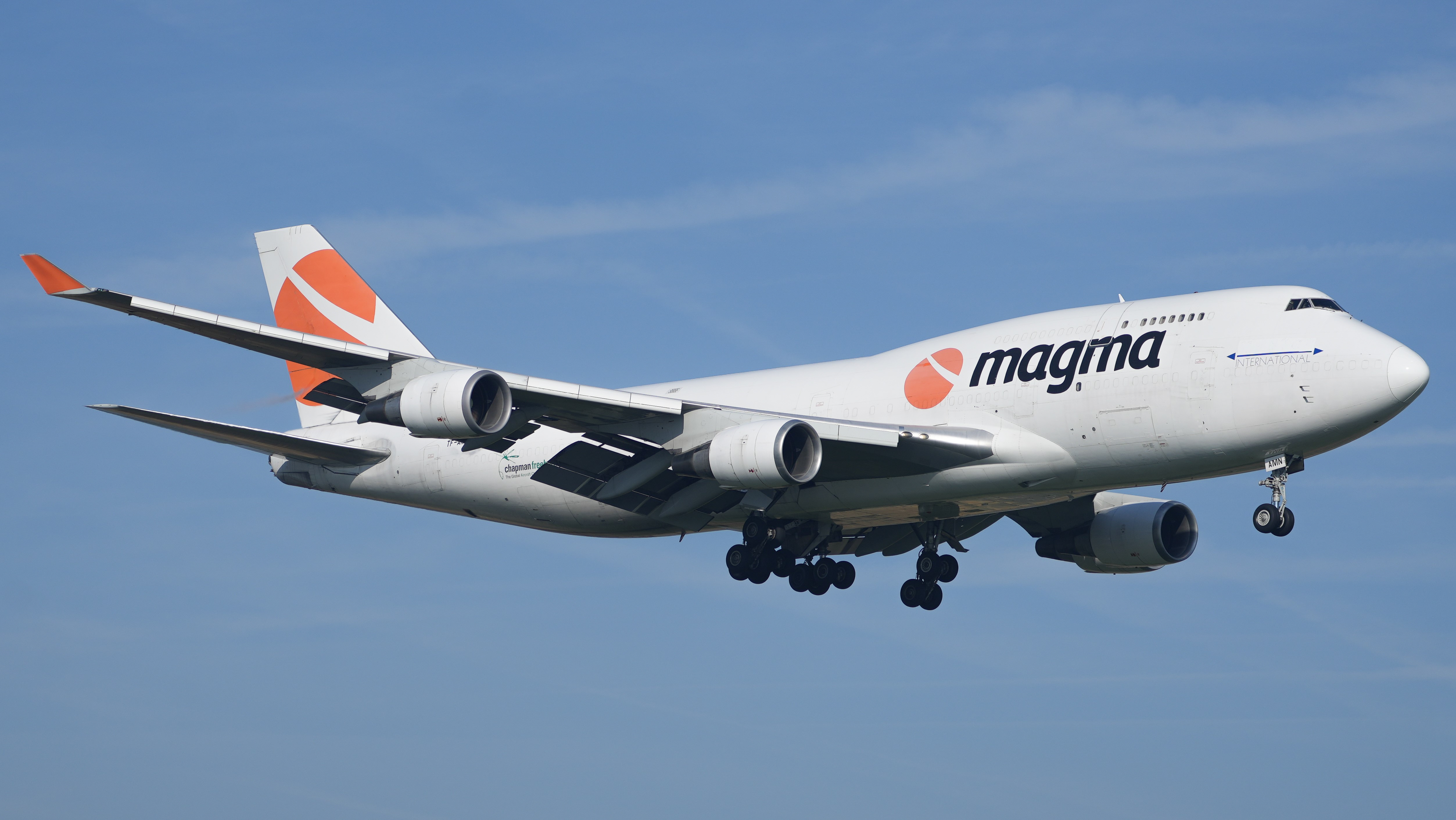
Magma Aviation Boeing 747-4F6(BDSF)

In 2024 Magma Aviation operated the following aircraft:

Aircraft type	Number of aircraft	Registration
Boeing 747-409F	1	TF-AKD
Boeing 747-481(BCF)	1	TF-AMP
Boeing 747-4F6(BDSF)	1	TF-AMN
Total	3	
