= Avion Express =

Aircraft, crew, maintenance and insurance provider

- Avion Express headquarters
IATA	ICAO	Call sign
X9	NVD	NORDVIND
- Founded: 2005
- AOC #: LT.AOC.003 in Lithuania MT-56 in Malta 16,474/SPO in Brazil
- Operating bases: Vilnius
- Subsidiaries: Avion Express Malta; Avion Express Brasil
- Fleet size: 12
- Parent company: Eyjafjoll SAS (owned by Avia Solutions Group)
- Headquarters: Vilnius, Lithuania
- Key people: Vytenis Suklys (CEO)
- Revenue: €205.3 million (2022)
- Website: avionexpress.aero

Avion Express is a provider of ACMI (aircraft, crew, maintenance and insurance) services to other carriers. Headquartered in Vilnius, it operates a fleet of 55 Airbus A320-family aircraft and holds air operator certificates in Lithuania, Malta and Brazil, with additional certificates under development in the Philippines and Mexico.

== History ==
Avion Express was established in 2005 as Nordic Solutions Air Services. At that time, the airline was operating four Saab 340 cargo and passenger aircraft. In 2008 the company was re-branded to its current name, Avion Express. In 2010 Avion Express was acquired by French investment company Eyjafjoll SAS, formed by Avion Capital Partners of Switzerland along with other investors.

In 2011 Avion Express introduced its first Airbus A320, which was the first Airbus aircraft to be registered in Lithuania. In December, two more Airbus A320s were added to the fleet. In 2013, Avion Express passed the IOSA Operational Safety Audit and obtained an IATA registration. The last Saab 340 cargo aircraft was removed from operation in March 2013. By summer of 2014, the airline was operating a fleet of nine Airbus A320s and two Airbus A319s. That same year Avion Express established a subsidiary company Dominican Wings, a low-cost airline based in Santo Domingo, Dominican Republic. In the summer of 2017, Avion Express introduced Airbus A321 aircraft. In June 2017, Avion Express announced that it had sold its 65% stake in Dominican Wings to the president of the company. In August 2017, Avion Express signed partnership agreement with the Lithuanian Aviation Academy (VGTU A. Gustaitis’ Aviation Institute). Since autumn 2017 Avion Express has also been collaborating with BAA Training on the cadet programme. In 2019 Avion Express established Avion Express Malta, a subsidiary company based in Malta. The company started operations in May the same year.

In early 2025, the company’s Brazilian subsidiary, Avion Express Brasil, received its air operator certificate (AOC), with plans to operate up to 25 aircraft by 2028. As of 2025, Avion Express holds AOCs in Lithuania, Malta, and Brazil, with an AOC under development in the Philippines and Mexico. Avion Express is in the process of obtaining an AOC in Mexico.

In 2026, following events in the Middle East and market changes, Avion Express has decided to update its strategy and to deliver back aircraft to lessors. The fleet consist now of only 25 aircraft, having cut its workforce by half.

As of June 2026, Darius Kajokas has stepped down from his role as CEO and Vytenis Suklys has been appointed to replace him.

== Fleet ==
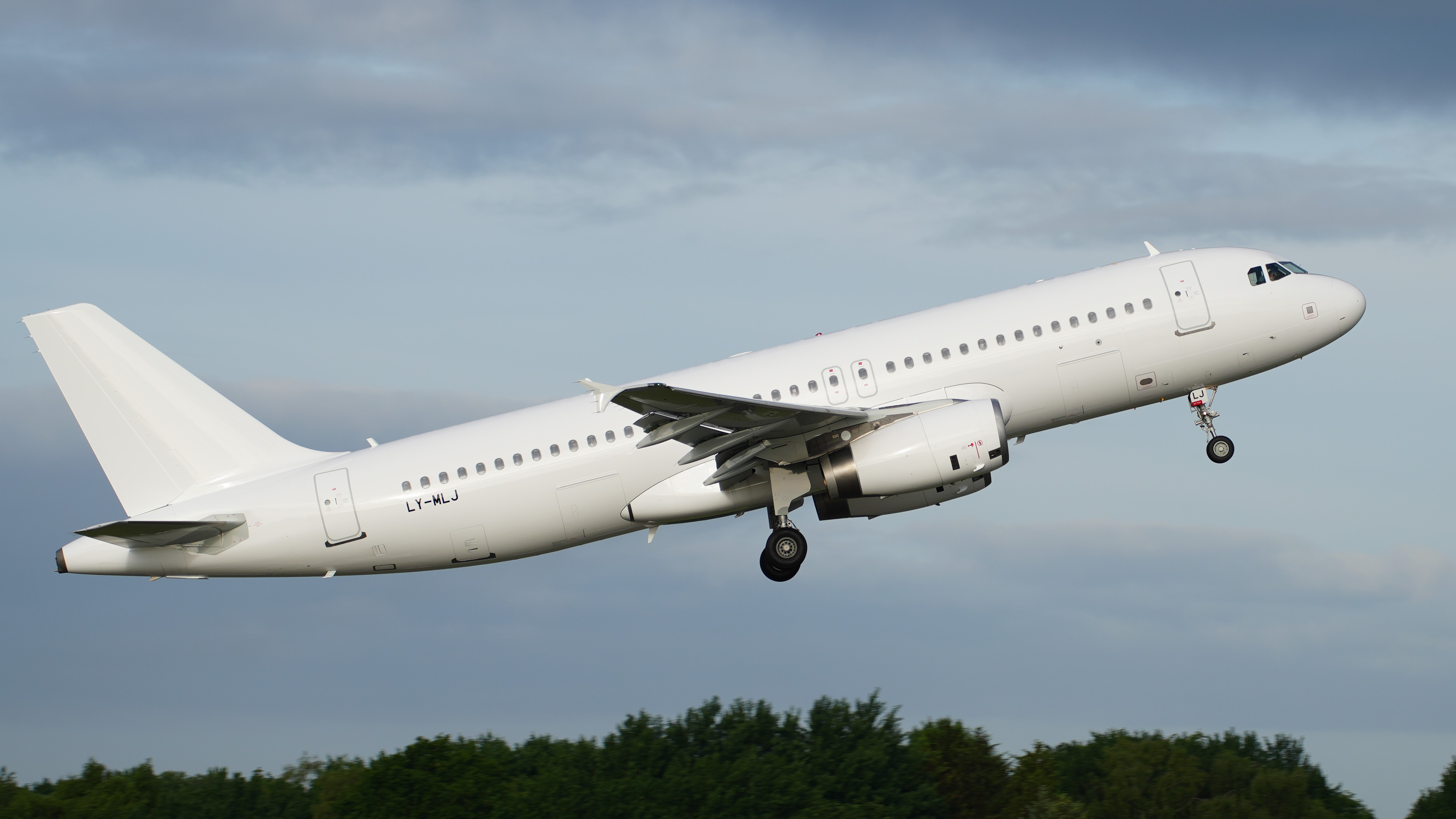
Avion Express Airbus A320-232

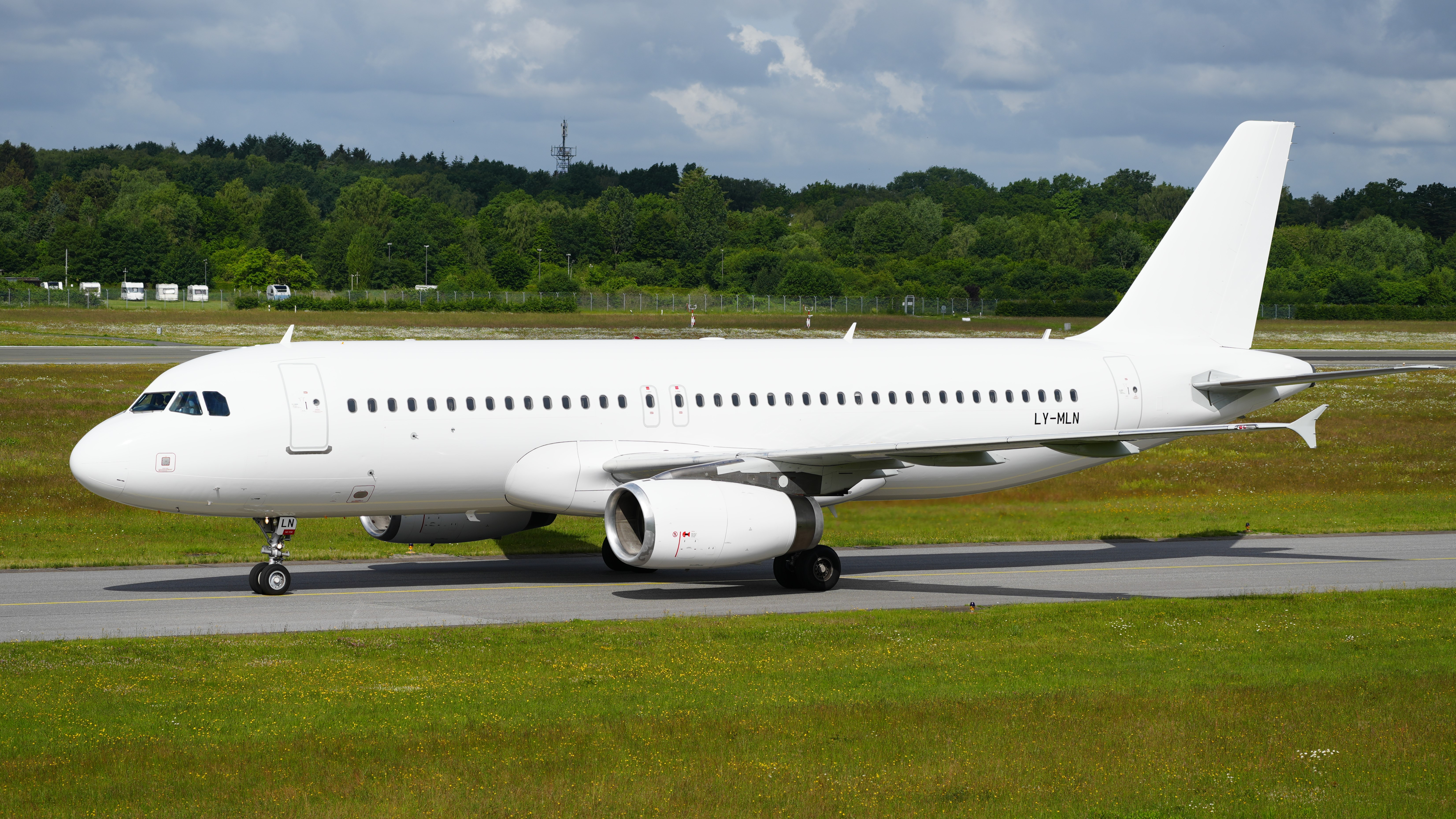
Avion Express Airbus A320-232

=== Avion Express ===
As of July 2026, Avion Express operates the following aircraft:

Aircraft	In service	Passengers
Airbus A320-200	12	180
Total	12	

=== Avion Express Malta ===
As of July 2026, Avion Express Malta operates the following aircraft:

Aircraft	In service	Passengers
Airbus A320	24	180
Total	24	

== Incidents and accidents ==
- On 3 February 2024, Vilnius International Airport was closed after Avion Express Flight 8242 (registration LY-NVL), landing from Milan Bergamo Airport veered off the runway and onto the grass whilst landing, the aircraft maneuvered back onto the runway and taxied to the terminal. The belly received substantial damage.
