= KlasJet =

Lithuania airline

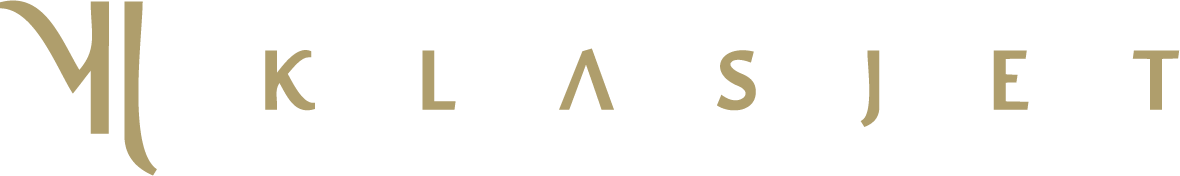
IATA	ICAO	Call sign
KJ*	KLJ	CLASS LINE
- Founded: 2013
- Fleet size: 12
- Parent company: Avia Solutions Group
- Headquarters: Vilnius, Lithuania
- Key people: Justinas Bulka (Managing Director); Diako Rad (Director Flight Operations)
- Website: https://klasjet.aero/

KlasJet is a Lithuanian charter airline that specializes in business-class charter flights. Having its headquarters located in Vilnius, it is a subsidiary of Avia Solutions Group offering VIP charter flights, ACMI services and in-flight management services in Europe, the Middle East, Africa and Asia with its Boeing 737-800 fleet.

== History ==
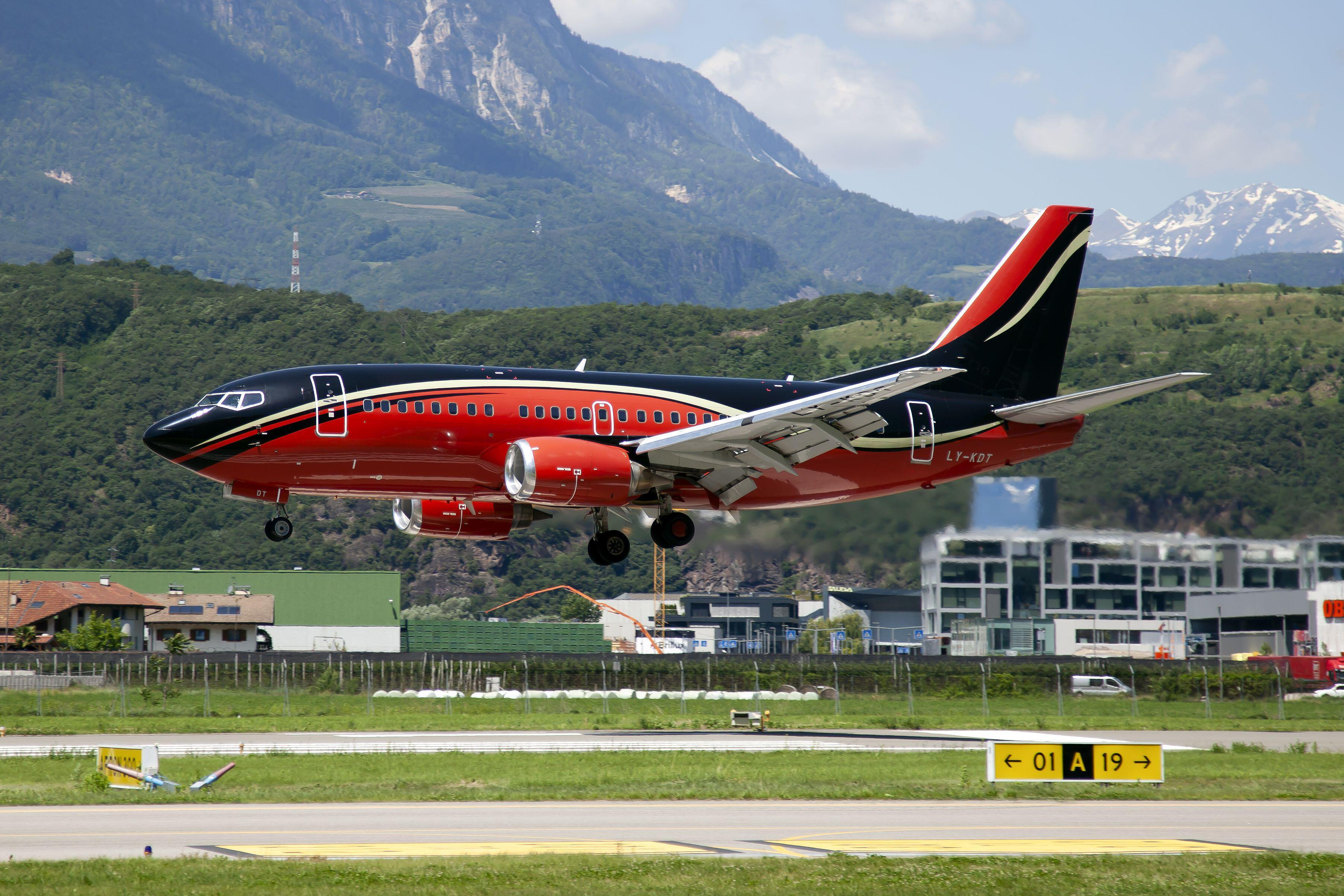
KlasJet Boeing 737-500

KlasJet was founded in October 2013 by Avia Solutions Group. Its first aircraft model was Bombardier Challenger 850.

KlasJet was awarded an AOC certificate in 2014 and began to carry out commercial flights. KlasJet has added one more Challenger 850 aircraft and finished operations with the jet in 2019.

In 2015, KlasJet added Hawker 800XP to its fleet. The airline finished using the aircraft for operations in 2019.

In 2016, KlasJet purchased the first Boeing 737-500 and started the refurbishment. In 2017, the company received a type-A license for commercial operations allowing flights with over 20 passengers on board, and started operating flights with the refurbished VIP Boeing 737-500.

During the 2017-2018 Euroleague season, KlasJet transported players of the Lithuanian basketball club Zalgiris Kaunas. In February 2018, the Canadian men's ice hockey team arrived at the Olympics in South Korea and chose the Boeing 737-500 for their transportation. The model was properly configured for its use as a sports team aircraft.

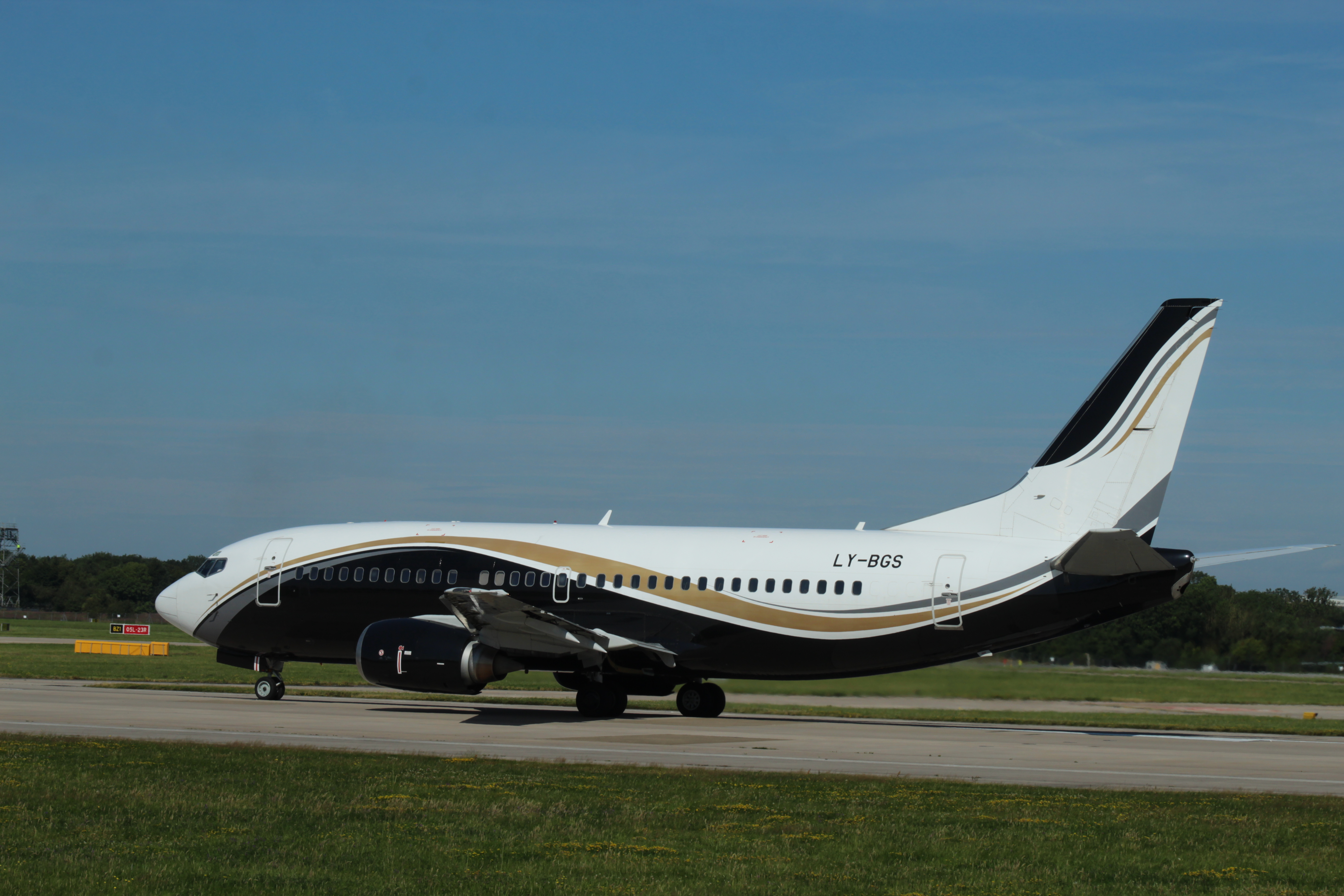
KlasJet Boeing 737-300, Manchester Airport

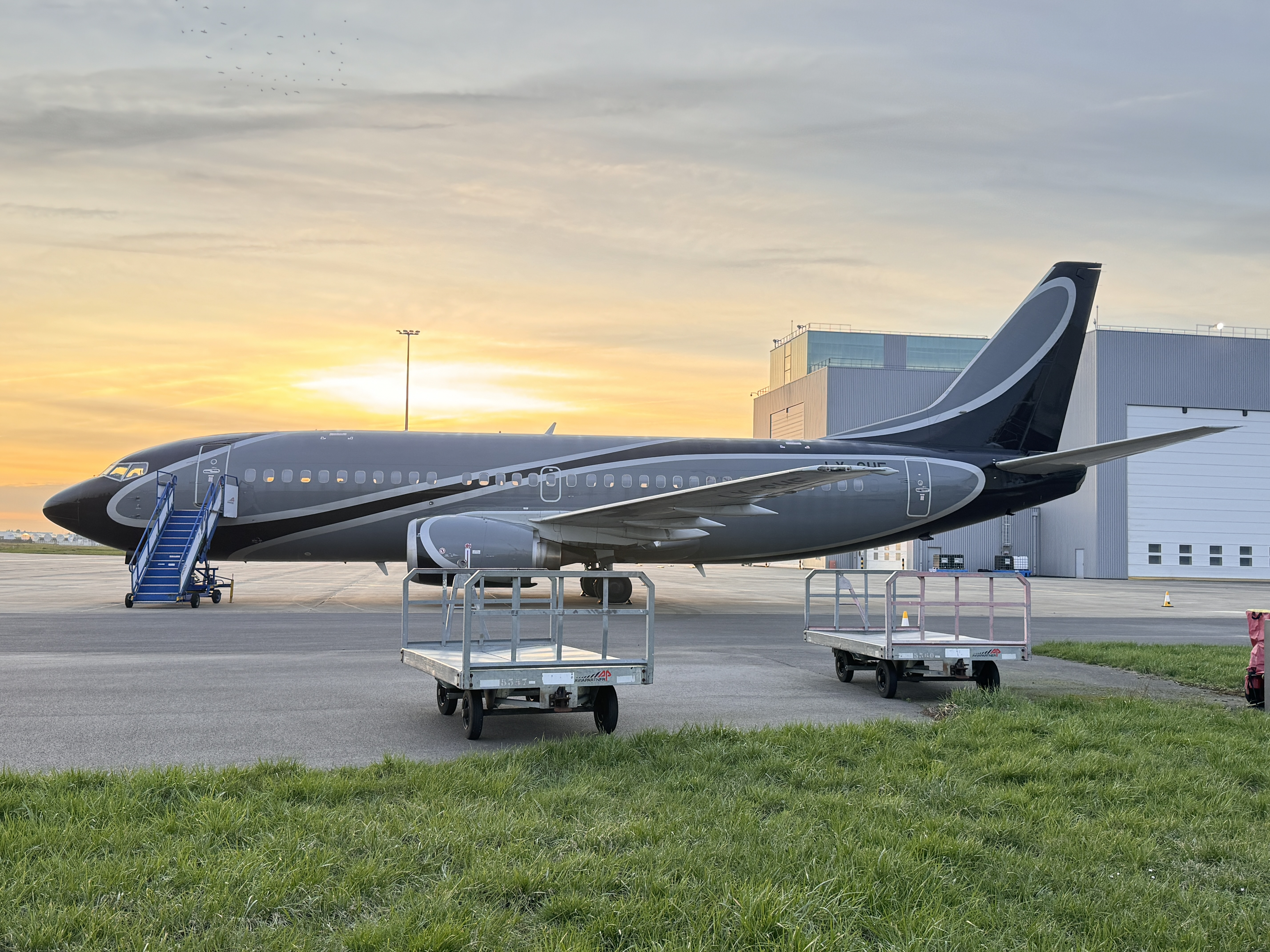
KlasJet Boeing 737-300, Saint-Nazaire Montoir Airport

By 2018-2019, KlasJet had added four more of the same-model aircraft, VIP Boeing 737-500, to its fleet.

In March 2020, KlasJet free of charge transported the shipment with dozens of thousands of medical masks and gloves to Lithuania. In June 2021, KlasJet repatriated citizens stranded by COVID-19 from Ghana to South Korea.

In 2020, in collaboration with cargo airline Bluebird Nordic, KlasJet added air cargo services to its portfolio and expanded its fleet by contracting a cargo aircraft Boeing 737-300. The company has operated the jet until 2021.

Since 2021, KlasJet pilots have been participating in the Pilot Peer Support Program (PPSP) through BAA Training.

In December 2021, KlasJet transported two rescued wild animals to northern Tanzania. The transportation was unprecedented since both animals were transported inside the cabin of KlasJet Boeing 737-500.

In February 2023, it launched ACMI (a short for "Aircraft, Crew, Maintenance, and Insurance") services and added eight Boeing 737-800 aircraft to its fleet. Also, in February, the first of two, Boeing 737-500, aircraft was moved to Dubai World Central for leasing with another, Boeing 737-300, to be moved a month later. In March 2023, the company introduced its Boeing 737-300 for the UK market and has decided to move two aircraft to Dubai World Central (DWC).

In October 2023, it reached an agreement with El Al Israel Airlines to provide more flights to and from Israel.

In November 2025, KlasJet successfully renewed IOSA certificate.

== Fleet ==
=== Current fleet ===
As of July 2026, KlasJet operates the following aircraft:

Aircraft type	Quantity
Boeing 737-300	2
Boeing 737-500	3
Boeing 737-800	7
Total	12

=== Former fleet ===
As of May 2026, KlasJet operated 2 Boeing 737-300, 3 Boeing 737-500 and 8 Boeing 737-800.
