= List of companies of Lithuania =

Location of Lithuania

Lithuania is a country in Northern Europe. Lithuania is a member of the European Union, the Council of Europe, a full member of the Eurozone, Schengen Agreement and NATO. It is also a member of the Nordic Investment Bank, and part of Nordic-Baltic Eight cooperation of Northern European countries. The United Nations Human Development Index lists Lithuania as a "very high human development" country. Lithuania has been among the fastest growing economies in the European Union and is ranked 21st in the world in the Ease of Doing Business Index.

For further information on the types of business entities in this country and their abbreviations, see "Business entities in Lithuania".

== Notable firms ==
This list includes notable companies with primary headquarters located in the country. The industry and sector follow the Industry Classification Benchmark taxonomy. Organizations which have ceased operations are included and noted as defunct.

Notable companies Status: P=Private, S=State; A=Active, D=Defunct
Name	Industry	Sector	Headquarters	Founded	Notes	Status	
Achema	Basic materials	Specialty chemicals	Jonava	1962	Fertilizer	P	A
Alita	Consumer goods	Brewers	Alytus	1963	Brewery	P	A
Amber Grid	Utilities	Gas distribution	Vilnius	2013	Natural gas	S	A
Apranga	Consumer services	Apparel retailers	Vilnius	1993	Retail clothing	P	A
Aurela	Consumer services	Airlines	Vilnius	1996	Charter airline, defunct 2013	P	D
Avia Solutions Group	Industrials	Transportation services	Vilnius	2010	Aviation support	P	A
Aviavilsa	Industrials	Delivery services	Vilnius	1999	Cargo airline	P	D
Avion Express	Consumer services	Airlines	Vilnius	2005	Charter airline	P	A
BLRT Western Shipyard	Industrials	Commercial vehicles & trucks	Klaipėda	1952	Shipyard	P	A
Baltik vairas	Consumer goods	Recreational products	Šiauliai	1993	Bicycles	P	A
Caffeine	Consumer services	Restaurants & bars	Vilnius	2007	Coffeehouse chain	P	A
Čili	Consumer services	Restaurants & bars	Vilnius	1997	Restaurant chain	P	A
DOT LT	Consumer services	Airlines	Karmėlava	2003	Airline	P	A
Dvarčionių keramika	Industrials	Building materials & fixtures	Vilnius	1888	Ceramic tile	P	A
Ekspla	Industrials	Electronic equipment	Vilnius	1983	Laser manufacturing	P	A
Emsi	Retail	Petrol stations	Vilnius	1991	Fuel retail chain	P	A
Grigeo AB	Basic materials	Paper	Grigiškės	1923	Paper	P	A
Gubernija	Consumer goods	Brewers	Šiauliai	1665	Brewery	P	A
Hostinger	Telecommunications	Telecommunications services	Vilnius	2004	Website hosting services	P	A
Ignitis	Utilities	Conventional electricity	Vilnius	1991	Energy	S	A
Kalnapilis	Consumer goods	Brewers	Panevėžys	1902	Brewery	P	A
Lietuvos paštas	Consumer services	Delivery services	Vilnius	1918	Postal service	S	A
Maxima Group	Consumer services	Broadline retailers	Vilnius	1992	Retail chain	P	A
Norfa	Consumer services	Broadline retailers	Vilnius	1997	Retail chain	P	A
Sanitas	Health care	Pharmaceuticals	Kaunas	1922	Pharmaceutical	P	A
Small Planet Airlines	Consumer services	Airlines	Vilnius	2007	Charter airline	P	D
Stumbras	Consumer goods	Distillers & vintners	Kaunas	1906	Distillery	P	A
Tauras	Consumer goods	Brewers	Vilnius	1860	Brewery	P	A
Telia Lietuva	Telecommunications	Fixed line telecommunications	Vilnius	1992	Telecom	P	A
Ūkio bankas	Financials	Banks	Kaunas	1989	Commercial bank	P	D
Vilniaus prekyba	Consumer services	Broadline retailers	Vilnius	1992	Retail chain	P	A
Vinted	Retail	Online second-hand sales	Vilnius	2008	Marketplace	P	A
Volfas Engelman	Consumer goods	Brewers	Kaunas	1853	Brewery	P	A
ŽIA valda	Financials	Investment services	Vilnius	1997	Investments	P	A

== See also ==
- Economy of Lithuania
- List of Lithuanians by net worth
- Lithuanian Confederation of Industrialists
- Linpra
