= List of defunct airlines of Lithuania =

This is a list of defunct airlines of Lithuania.

Airline	Image	IATA	ICAO	Callsign	Commenced operations	Ceased operations	Notes
Air Lithuania		TT	KLA	KAUNAS	1996	2005	
Air Lituanica		LT	LTU	LITUANICA	2012	2015	
Amber Air		0A	GNT	GINTA	2004	2007	
Apatas Air			LYT	APATAS	1994	2009	
Aurela			LSK	AURELA	1996	2013	
Aviapaslauga			AVX		1994	2005	
Aviavilsa			LVR	AVIAVILSA	1999	2018	
City Air Services					1991	1992	Renamed/merged to Lietuva Aviakompanija
Danu Oro Transportas		W3;R6	DNU		2003	2006	Renamed/merged to DOT LT
FlyLAL		TE	LIL	LITHUANIAN	2005	2009	
FlyLAL Charters			LLC		2008	2010	Rebranded as Small Planet Airlines
Lithuanian Air Lines					1938	1940	After occupation and annexation of Lithuania was absorbed into Aeroflot
Lithuanian Airlines		TE	LIL		1991	2005	Rebranded as FlyLAL
Nordic Solutions Air		N9	NVD		2005	2008	Rebranded as Avion Express
Small Planet Airlines		S5	LLC	SMALL PLANET	2008	2018	
Star1 Airlines		V9	HCW	Hermis Capital	2009	2010	

== See also ==
- List of airlines of Lithuania
- List of airports in Lithuania
