= HST =

HST may refer to:

== People ==
- Harry S. Truman (1884–1972), 33rd president of the US
- Hunter S. Thompson (1937–2005), American journalist and author

== Science and technology ==
- Hubble Space Telescope
- Harvard–MIT Program in Health Sciences and Technology
- History of science and technology
- High-speed telegraphy, a radiosport
- High-Speed Transfer, a USRobotics modem protocol
- Highstand systems tract, in the sequence stratigraphy branch of geology

== Transportation and military ==
- Hastings railway station, Melbourne (Station code), Australia
- Helicopter support team, in the US Marine Corps
- Helsinki City Transport (Swedish: Helsingfors stads trafikverk)
- Heritage Shunters Trust, an English rail preservation society
- High-speed train, a type of rail transport
  - InterCity 125 or High Speed Train, UK
- High Street (Glasgow) railway station (station code), Scotland
- High Sierra Trail, in California, US
- Homestead Air Reserve Base (IATA code), Florida, US
- USS Harry S. Truman (nickname: HST), an aircraft carrier of the US Navy
- High-speed transport, a type of amphibious assault ship
- Heston Airlines, a Lithuanian charter airline (ICAO: HST)

== Other uses ==
- Harmonized sales tax, in Canada
- Hawaii–Aleutian Standard Time (UTC−10)
- Hegemonic stability theory, in international relations
- Holden Street Theatres, Adelaide, Australia
- Hospital Santo Tomás, in Panama City, Panama
- Host Hotels & Resorts (stock ticker $HST), American REIT
