= List of airlines of Lithuania =

This is a list of airlines which have Air Operator Certificates in Lithuania.

== Charter airlines ==
Airline	Image	ICAO	IATA	Callsign	Commenced operations	Fleet size	Operating bases	Notes
Avion Express		NVD	X9	NORDVIND	2005	50	Vilnius	Rebranded from Nordic Solutions Air (2005–2008)
DAT LT		DNU	R6	DANU	2004	5	Kaunas	Rebranded from DOT LT in 2019
GetJet Airlines		GJT	GW	GETJET	2016	17	Vilnius	
Grand Cru Airlines		GCA		GRAND CRU	2013	3	Vilnius	
Heston Airlines		HST	HN	HESTON	2021	12 (+3 Order)	Vilnius	
KlasJet		KLJ	KLJ	CLASS LINE	2023	13	Vilnius	

== Public service obligation ==
Airline	Image	ICAO	IATA	Callsign	Commenced operations	Notes
Transaviabaltika		KTB		TRANSBALTIKA	1998	

== See also ==
- List of airlines
- List of defunct airlines of Lithuania
- List of defunct airlines of Europe
