= LVR =

LVR can mean:

- Lyon Villeurbanne Rugby
- Loan to value ratio
- Longitudinal Video Recording
- Latvian ruble, the currency of Latvia from 1919 to 1922 and from 1992 to 1993
- Large Volume Receiver (see Postcodes in Australia)
- Lietuvos vietinė rinktinė (Lithuanian Territorial Defense Force)
- Las Vegas Raiders, an American football team in the NFL
- Low-voltage release, a feature allowing machinery to automatically restart when power is restored following a power outage, as opposed to low-voltage protection

Transport

- Lehigh Valley Railroad
- Lachlan Valley Railway
- Lavender MRT station, Singapore (MRT station abbreviation)
- Aviavilsa, Lithuania (ICAO airline code)
- Lucas do Rio Verde Airport (IATA code)

See also

- LVRS can mean Lung Volume Reduction Surgery
