= Vilnius City Innovation Industrial Park =

Coordinates: 54°45′12″N 25°24′50″E

Vilnius City Innovation Industrial Park (VCIIP) is an industrial park located in Vilnius, Lithuania. The park is 24 ha and has developed infrastructure. In 2015, VCIIP was granted the status of a national importance economic project.

== Companies ==
The park is for companies operating in the smart specialization priority areas. Companies include Poliprojektas, Experimentica, Sanobiotec, and Biotecha. From 2022 and onwards, the majority of members of the Life Sciences Digital Innovation Hub cluster will be based in the life sciences incubator at the VCIIP territory.

== Transport ==
The park is about 30 minutes from Vilnius international airport. Public transport is available.
