= AVX =

AVX may refer to:

== Computing ==
- Advanced Vector Extensions, an instruction set extension in the x86 microprocessor architecture
  - AVX2, an expansion of the AVX instruction set
  - AVX-512, 512-bit extensions to the 256-bit AVX
- Softwin AVX (AntiVirus eXpert), former name of Bitdefender

== Transportation ==
- Aviapaslauga (ICAO airline code AVX); see List of defunct airlines of Lithuania
- Aeroclub de Vitoria (ICAO airline code AVX); see List of airline codes (A)
- Catalina Airport (IATA airport code AVX), Avalon, Catalina Island, California, US

== Other uses ==
- AVX Corporation, a manufacturer of electronic parts and a division of Kyocera
- Avengers vs. X-Men, a comic book event

== See also ==
- UltraAVX
