= Longitudinal Video Recording =

Consumer VCR system and videotape standard

Longitudinal Video Recording or LVR was a consumer VCR system and videotape standard.

== Comparison with other VCR technologies ==
LVR differed from other VCR technologies in that instead of running a tape slowly past a pair of rapidly moving recording heads and laying the tracks obliquely across the tape in a helical scan, the LVR ran a tape quickly past a stationary recording head which would step across the tape width and lay down a series of parallel tracks along the tape's length. The head used fixed scanning but moved down the tape to the next track once the end of the quickly moving tape (240 ips with 300 tracks to a ½” tape) had been reached.

== Development ==
Work had begun on longitudinal video recording as early as 1950 by the electronics division of entertainer Bing Crosby's production company, Bing Crosby Enterprises (BCE), who had pioneered the use of magnetic tape recording for his radio show in the 1940s. BCE gave the world's first demonstration of a videotape recording in Los Angeles on November 11, 1951. Developed by John T. Mullin and Wayne R. Johnson since 1950, the device gave what were described as "blurred and indistinct" images, using a modified Ampex 200 tape recorder and standard quarter-inch (0.6 cm) audio tape moving at 360 inches (9.1 m) per second. A year later, an improved version, using one-inch (2.6 cm) magnetic tape, was shown to the press, who reportedly expressed amazement at the quality of the images, although they had a "persistent grainy quality that looked like a worn motion picture". Overall, the picture quality was still considered inferior to the best kinescope recordings on film. Bing Crosby Enterprises hoped to have a commercial version available in 1954, but none came forth. BCE demonstrated a color model in February 1955, using a longitudinal recording on half-inch (1.3 cm) tape, essentially similar to what RCA had demonstrated in 1953. CBS, RCA's competitor, was about to order BCE machines when Ampex introduced the superior Quadruplex system (see below).

From then it became clear that 'rotating-head' helical scan recorders were the way forward with superior sound and picture quality. However the expense of rotating-head machines ($2000 for a machine in 1956) meant that work continued on developing a consumer stationary-head machine for some time with efforts from Akai, GEC and the BBC. The BBC abandoned their VERA system in 1958 in favor of the Ampex quadruplex system, though further research continued with the BBC Research department demonstrating an experimental digital LVR machine in June 1974 which recorded colour television on 42 tracks on a one-inch tape moving at 120 ips.

The first home VCRs to become widely available were the Sony U-Matic system in 1971 and Philips VCR system, released in 1972. However, the first system to be successful with consumers was Sony's Betamax in 1975. This was quickly followed by the competing VHS (Video Home System) format from JVC, and later by Video 2000 from Philips. BASF had announced a commercial LVR as early as 1974, however it wasn't demonstrated until Autumn 1978 at the Berlin Radio Show. Toshiba first demonstrated their prototype LVR at the Consumer Electronics Show in Chicago in June 1979. Although using the same principle, the tapes developed by BASF and Toshiba were incompatible, with BASF moving a length of tape back and forth over the head, whilst Toshiba used a continuous loop.

One of the advantages touted for the system was the low production cost of both the tapes and the hardware but consumers never had the chance to try it. Problems with the poor picture quality caused by a very brief interruption to the picture as the head moved down led to delays in production. In addition, the uncertainty as European rival Blaupunkt began developing their own system and the quality issues let VHS and Betamax become the dominant formats and the LVR never went to market.

== See also ==
- Vision Electronic Recording Apparatus

== Sources ==
- Eric D. Daniel; C. Denis Mee; Mark H. Clark. Magnetic recording:the first 100 years. Wiley-Blackwell. ISBN 978-0-7803-4709-0.
