= GetJet Airlines =

Lithuanian charter airline

IATA	ICAO	Call sign
GW	GJT	GETJET
- Founded: March 2016; 10 years ago
- Commenced operations: May 2016; 10 years ago
- Operating bases: Vilnius Airport
- Fleet size: 18
- Parent company: GetJet Group
- Headquarters: Vilnius, Lithuania
- Key people: Aleksandr Celiadin (Executive Chairman) Inga Duglas (CEO) Darius Viltrakis (CEO of GetJet Group)
- Revenue: €184.3 mil. (2024)
- Employees: 910
- Website: getjet.aero

GetJet Airlines is a Lithuanian airline company established in 2016 that offers charter flights and aircraft with crew leasing services worldwide. Since 2022, the company has been part of the GetJet Group.

GetJet Airlines has operated ACMI wet leases for airlines including Eurowings, Wizz Air, Finnair, Etihad Airways Transavia, Icelandair, TUI Airways, Vueling, and others.

== History ==
GetJet Airlines was founded by Aleksandr Celiadin. The company's first flight took place on 25 May 2016.

In late 2018, the company took over Small Planet Airlines' chartered flights from the Vilnius Airport.

In September 2019, the company signed an agreement to operate Sunwing Airlines flights in Canadian territory. In October 2019, GetJet Airlines began operating transatlantic flights to North America between Warsaw and Toronto on behalf of LOT Polish Airlines using an Airbus A330 aircraft.

In 2020, during the COVID-19 pandemic, GetJet modified aircraft to transport cargo, including the first COVID-19 vaccines to Lithuania. In 2020, GetJet was named the leader of Lithuania's transport and logistics sector at the Verslo žinios awards.

In 2022, GetJet Airlines operated its first commercial flight to Australia. It reported EBITDA of 28 million EUR in 2023.

In 2023, GetJet Airlines achieved a profitability level that stood out significantly within the aviation industry. According to the International Air Transport Association (IATA), the average EBIT margin among industry players was 4.5%, while GetJet Airlines reported an EBIT margin of 15.9%—nearly four times higher.

In 2024, GetJet Airlines added three Airbus A320 and two Boeing 737-800 aircraft to its fleet.

In 2024, GetJet Airlines was recognized as one of the 25 most productive companies in Lithuania.

In 2024, GetJet Aviation Holdings (now GetJet Group), an international aviation services group headquartered in Lithuania, reported a net profit of €25.4 million, with total revenues across the companies which currently comprise the group reaching €184.3 million in 2024. GetJet continues to maintain one of the highest profitability rates globally in the ACMI and aircraft maintenance sectors.

In 2025, GetJet Airlines reported revenue of €165 million, EBITDA of €13 million and net profit of €9.4 million. During the year, the airline added six aircraft, bringing its fleet to 20, and expanded its international operations through partnerships with Etihad Airways and Eurowings. The company also announced plans to expand its in-house maintenance capabilities, including a €10 million MRO facility at Vilnius Airport.

In 2026, GetJet Airlines expanded its investment in aircraft maintenance infrastructure as part of a strategy to increase its technical independence and reduce reliance on external maintenance providers. In addition to a 4,664-square-metre site at Vilnius International Airport, GetJet Group subsidiary Airhub Aviation secured an adjacent 11,200-square-metre site for a second hangar, with approximately €25 million planned for the project. The new facility will become the group's third MRO facility.

== Fleet ==
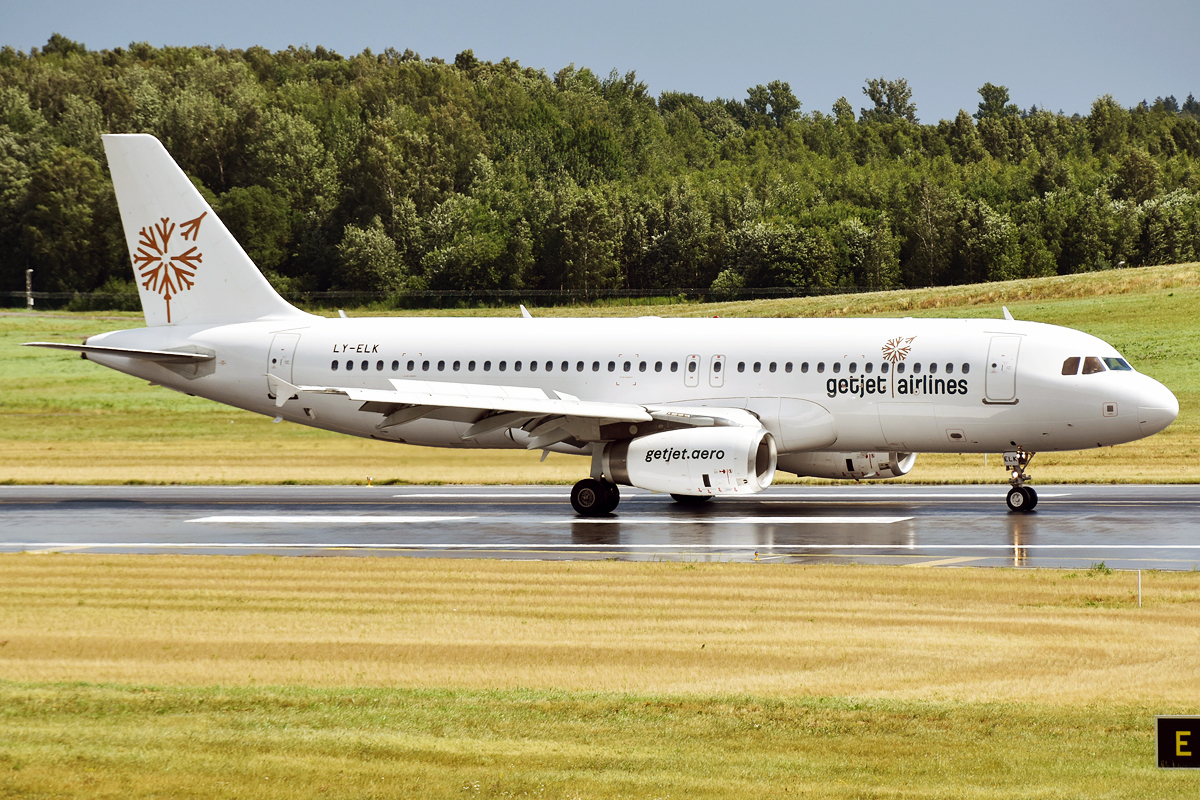
GetJet Airbus A320-200

=== Current fleet ===
As of July 2026, GetJet Airlines operates the following aircraft:

GetJet Airlines fleet
Aircraft	In service	Orders	Passengers			Notes
Aircraft	In service	Orders	C	Y	Total	Notes
Airbus A320-200	12	—	—	180	180	
Airbus A321-200	1	—	—	220	220	
Boeing 737-800	5	—	—	189	189	
Total	18	—				

=== Former fleet ===
As of August 2025, GetJet Airlines operated 10 Airbus A320-200, 1 Airbus A321-200 and 5 Boeing 737-800.
