= Grzegorz Kurec =

Polish-Belarusian entrepreneur, architect, and builder (1868–1942)

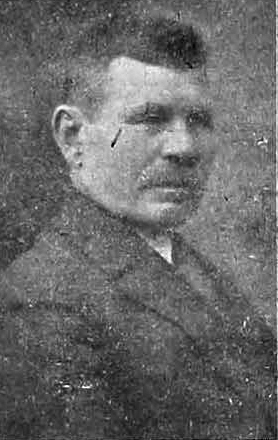
- Grzegorz Kurec
- Born: May 5, 1868; Shypki, Vileysky Uyezd, Russian Empire
- Died: March 6, 1942 (aged 73); Berlin, Nazi Germany
- Occupations: Entrepreneur, Architect, Builder
- Known for: Founder of Grigiškės paper factory.

Grzegorz Kurec (Belarusian: Рыгор Курэц, romanized: Ryhor Kurec, Lithuanian: Grigas Kurecas; 5 May 1868 – 6 March 1942) was a Polish entrepreneur, architect, and builder of Belarusian origins. He established one of the largest paper factories of the time, Grigiškės, and was the founder of the city of Grigiškės. His son, Włodzimierz, was a pilot and rally driver.

== Background ==
Kurec was born in 1868 into a Belarusian farming family in Shypki village (Belarusian: Шыпкі). As a child, he developed an interest in mechanics and worked as an apprentice and metalworker in several factories in Vilnius. He gained valuable experience at the Putilov Company and later through private orders.

== Career ==
In 1923, he started a paper factory. In the autumn of 1925, he officially opened Grigiškės, which had a production capacity of 5 tons of paper per year. However, the factory was nationalized in 1940 when the Soviets took over. The value of all of Kurec's property was estimated to be 8 million litas. It employed around 1,000 workers.
