= AB Sanitas =

Sanitas
- Industry: Pharmaceutical industry
- Defunct: 15 November 2019
- Headquarters: Veiverių g. 134B, LT-46352 Kaunas, Lithuania
- Number of employees: 110
- Website: http://sanitas.lt/About-Sanitas-862.html

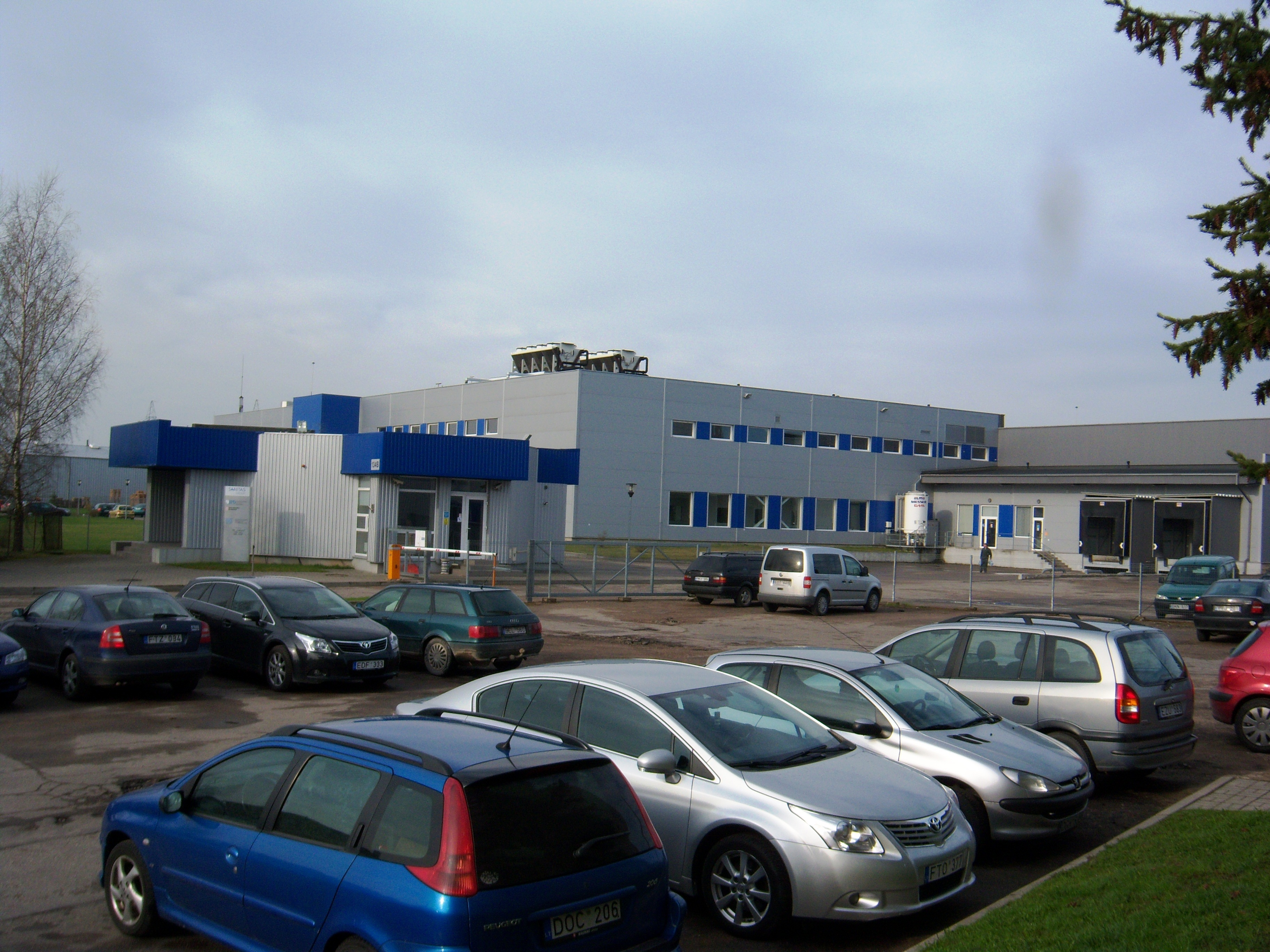
Sanitas, farmacijos įmonė

AB "Sanitas" is one of the oldest and largest pharmaceutical companies in Lithuania. The company produces and markets non-proprietary medicinal products – injection preparations, tablets, capsules, eye drops. It was acquired by Valeant Pharmaceuticals International, Inc. (NYSE: VRX) (TSX: VRX) in 2011.

== History ==
Sanitas was established in 1922. As a public limited liability company Sanitas was registered in the Republic of Lithuania in 1994. In the same year its shares were listed on the National Securities Exchange. From 19 August 2011 the controlling shareholding (99.4 percent) in AB Sanitas is held by Valeant Pharmaceuticals International. The General Manager of the company is Saulius Mečislovas Žemaitis, the company currently employs about 110 people.

- In 1922, AB Sanitas was established in Kaunas – a pharmaceutical laboratory producing cosmetics.
- In 1994, Sanitas was privatized, and its shares were listed on the National Securities Exchange.
- In May 2004, Sanitas acquired a Lithuanian manufacturer of pharmaceutical preparations – AB Endokrininiai Preparatai.
- On 21 November 2005, the shares of AB Sanitas were entered onto the Main List of NASDAQ OMX Vilnius securities exchange.
- In 2006, Sanitas acquired a Polish company, Jelfa, which was integrated into the Sanitas group. More than a hundred new products were added to the range of products manufactured by the Sanitas group.
- In 2005, Sanitas group took hold in Hungary and Bulgaria and in 2007 – also in Czech Republic and Slovakia.
- In 2006, construction of a new plant started in Kaunas according to the program financed from the European Union structural funds, which was launched in September 2008.
- In December 2008, Sanitas acquired the company Homeofarm registered in Poland.
- In August 2011, the controlling shareholding (87.2 percent) in the Sanitas group was acquired by the Canadian company Valeant Pharmaceuticals International, Inc. for 272,853 mln. euros (942,107 mln. litas). In July 2013 Valeant became a sole shareholder of Sanitas.

== Products ==
Sanitas manufacturing capacities allow producing various forms of medicines – tablets, capsules, ampoules, eye drops and complicated preparations that create value added – disposable filled syringes.

The company bases its activities on the European Good Manufacturing Practice (GMP) – high quality assurance standards that guarantee consistency in creating, manufacturing, investigating preparations so that they would correspond to their purpose, the requirements of the marketing authorization certificate and of the specifications.

Sanitas manufactures products of about 50 different names. Among medicinal products marketed in Lithuania are Neocitramonas, Paracetamolis Sanitas, Neoaskofenas, Ranitidinas Sanitas, Panogastin, Latalux, Ecriten, Eufilinas Sanitas, Askorbo rūgštis Sanitas, Analginas Sanitas, Ketolgan, Alkostop and other prescription and over-the-counter medications.

All the products of the Sanitas group are divided according to therapeutic areas:

- dermatology (skin diseases, promotion of healthy skin care, including dermatological cosmetics);
- medicinal products for hospitals (injection preparations for treatment of acute diseases);
- medicinal products for the digestive system;
- ophthalmology (eye care and good vision);
- urology (prostate and age related disorders);
- over-the-counter medicines (painkillers and anti-inflammatory medication)
- food supplements (vitamins, etc.)

== See also ==
- List of companies of Lithuania
- List of pharmaceutical companies
