= Vision Electronic Recording Apparatus =

Attempt by the BBC to record television onto magnetic tape

Vision Electronic Recording Apparatus (VERA)
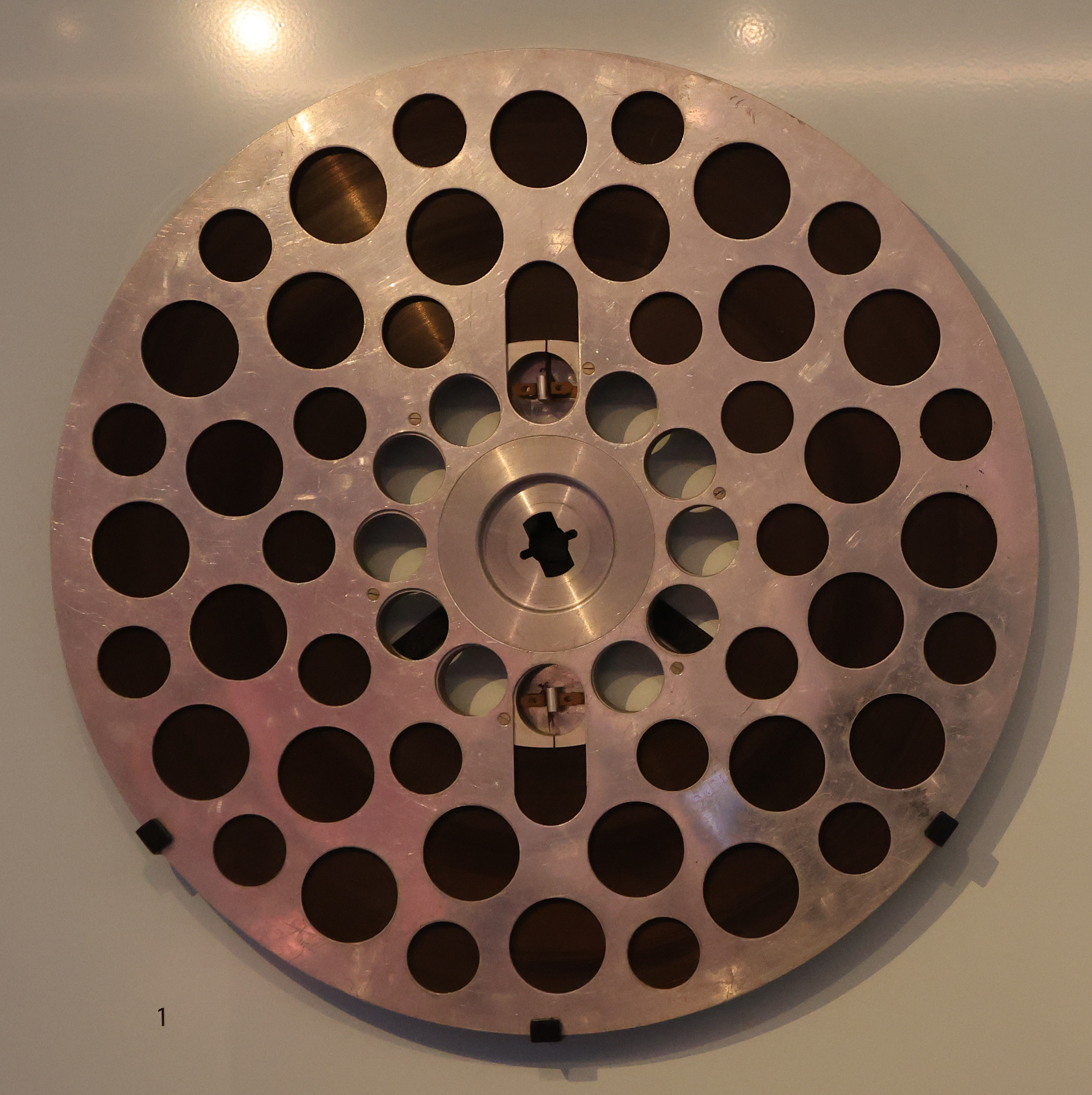
- A tape reel for a Vision Electronic Recording Apparatus
- Media type: Magnetic tape, ½-inch open reel
- Encoding: System A
- Developed by: BBC
- Usage: Video production

Vision Electronic Recording Apparatus (VERA) was an early analog recording videotape format developed from 1952 by the BBC under project manager Dr Peter Axon.

== History ==
In order to record high frequencies, a tape must move rapidly with respect to the recording or playback head. The frequencies used by video signals are so high that the tape/head speed is on the order of several meters per second (tens of feet per second), an order of magnitude faster than professional analog audio tape recording. The BBC solved the problem by using 52-centimetre (20 in) reels of magnetic tape that passed static heads at a speed of 5.08 metres per second (16.7 ft/s).

VERA was capable of recording about 15 minutes (e.g. 4,572 meters) of 405-line black-and-white video per reel, and the picture tended to wobble because of some jitter (uneven speed) of the tape transport. Later video recorders used a time base corrector to remove this jitter and make synchronization with the studio house possible.

In order to cope with 625-line PAL or SECAM colour transmissions VERA would likely have required an even faster, and possibly unfeasible, tape speed.

Development began in 1952, but VERA was not perfected until 1958. It was given a live demonstration on-air on Panorama on 14 April 1958; Richard Dimbleby, seated by a clock, talked for a couple of minutes about the new method of vision recording with instant playback, and then the tape was wound back and replayed. The picture was slightly watery, but reasonably watchable, and instant playback was something completely new.

However, by this time it had already been rendered obsolete by the Ampex quadruplex video recording system. This used five-centimetre-wide (2.0 in) tapes running at a speed of 38 cm (15 in) per second. The rapid tape-to-head speed of quadruplex videotape was achieved by spinning the heads rapidly on a drum: the system used, with variations, on all videotape systems ever since, as well as DAT.

The BBC scrapped VERA and quickly adopted the Ampex system. It has been suggested that the BBC only continued to develop VERA as a bargaining tool, so it would be offered some of the first Ampex machines produced in unstated exchange for abandoning further work on a potential rival, but the colossal disadvantages of VERA and its status as a technological dead-end make this seem highly unlikely.

== See also ==
- Helical scan
