= Helicopter support team =

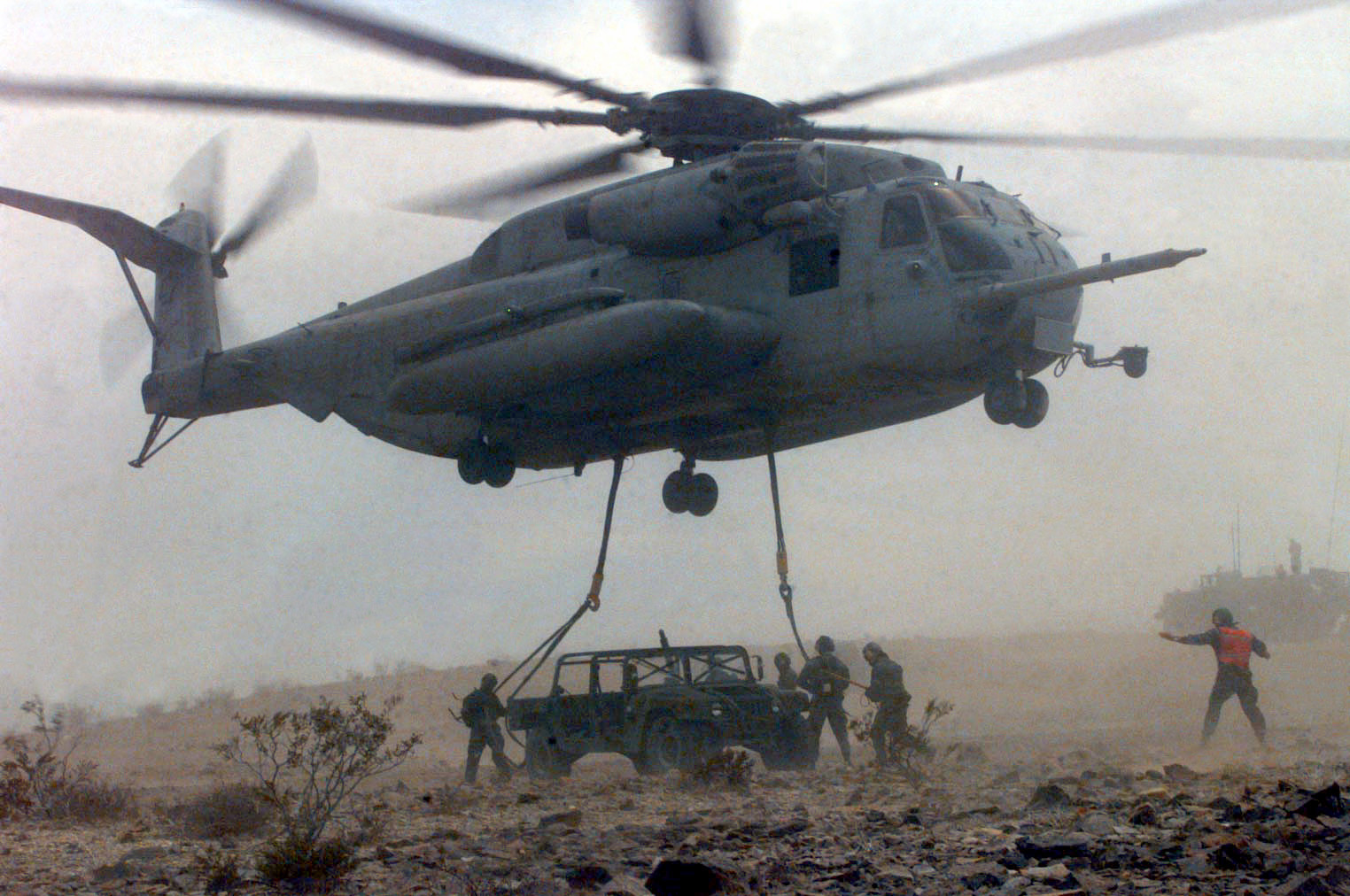
An HST guiding a CH-53E crew from HMH-461 doing external lifts during Combined Armed Exercise 6-97 (CAX 6-97)

A helicopter support team (HST) is a unit of organization within the United States Marine Corps that manages the activities of a helicopter landing zone (LZ). It consists of a team of eight Landing Support Marines who are trained to hook up external loads to the hooks of primarily military helicopters. All kinds of gear can be lifted by helicopter and taken to locations with terrain that is not suited for other kinds of vehicles. For example communications equipment can be placed on top of a mountain within a few minutes of flight instead of a few hours of driving, if one could even drive the equipment to the designated location. The HST is a valuable resource to the Marine Air-Ground Task Force (MAGTF), as it provides an expedient manner of transportation for gear and supplies.

Within the HST there is the HST commander whose job is to co-ordinate the mission between the airwing, the supporting unit and the Marine Logistics Group who provides the HST. The HST commander is usually a sergeant and sometimes a staff sergeant. Subordinate to the HST commander is the HST Safety NCO, whose job is to ensure that the gear or supplies are rigged properly, and to ensure that everyone underneath the helicopter is doing their job in a safe manner. The safety NCO is normally a corporal or sergeant. The primary members of the HST are the "leg-men" and the inside and outside directors along with the hookman and the static man. The inside and outside directors direct the pilot of the aircraft as he centers his helicopter over the load that is being lifted. The leg-men ensure that the slings used to lift the gear do not catch on anything and lift in a straight manner as to not disturb the load being lifted. The job of the static man is to use a grounding rod to attach to the hook so that the static electricity conducted by the helicopter is grounded and does not end up killing a marine. The hook man then hooks up the load to the hook of the aircraft in a safe manner.
