= Grigiškės =

- Eldership and city
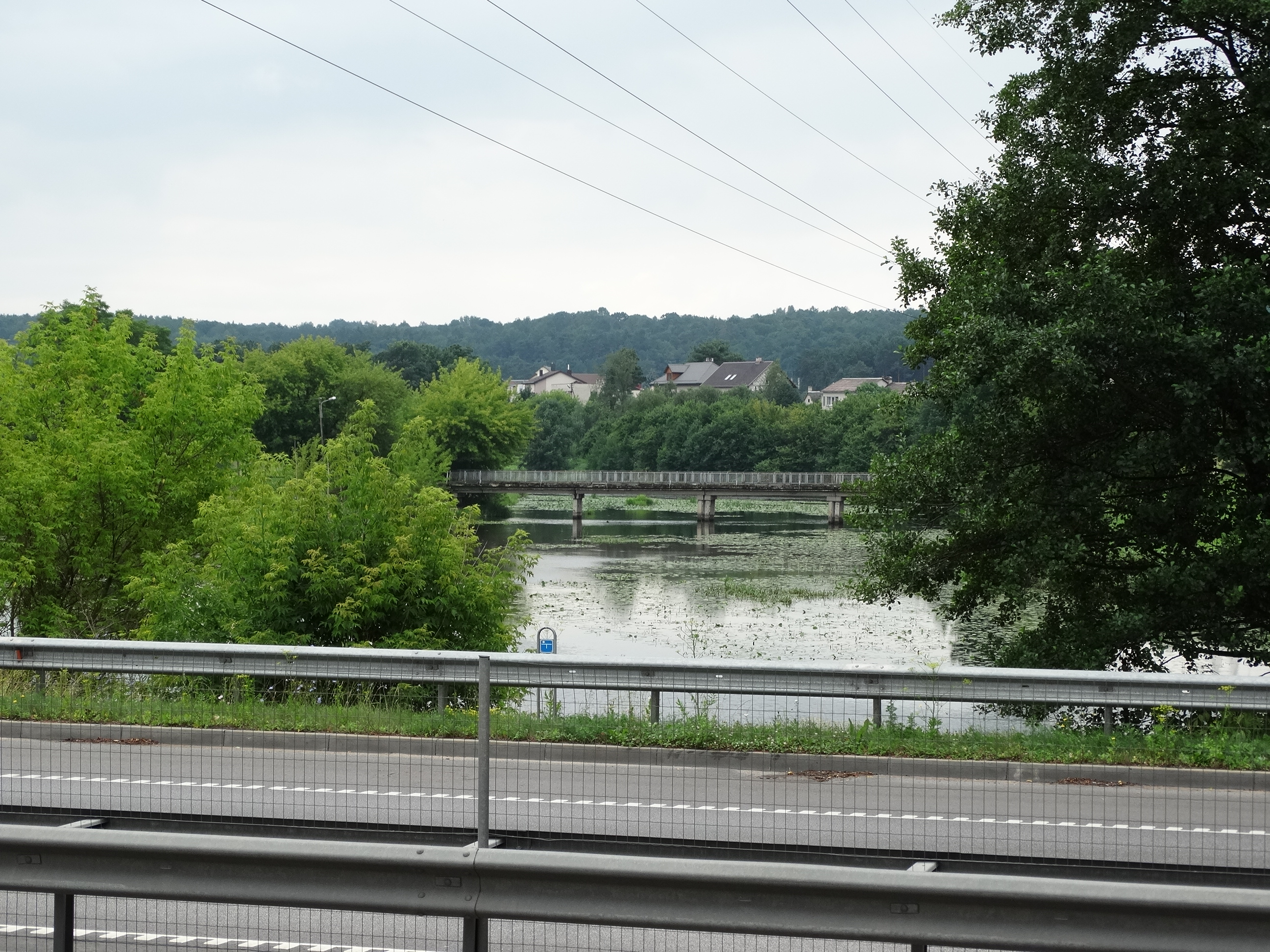

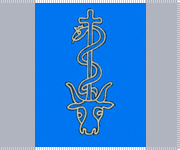
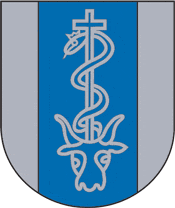
- Flag Coat of arms

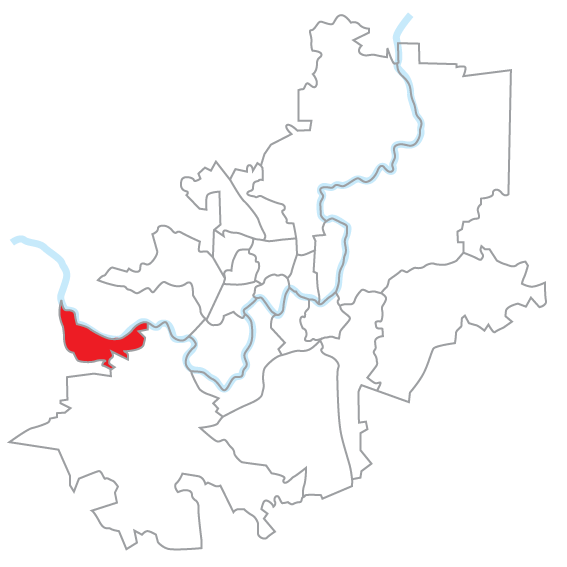

- Location of Grigiškės
- Country: Lithuania
- Ethnographic region: Dzūkija
- County: Vilnius County
- Municipality: Vilnius city municipality
- Eldership: Grigiškės eldership
- Capital of: Grigiškės eldership
- First mentioned: 1923
- Granted urban-type settlement status: 1958
- Granted city rights: 1996

Area
  - Total: 7.1 km^{2} (2.7 sq mi)

Population (2021)
  - Total: 9,396
  - Density: 1,300/km^{2} (3,400/sq mi)
- Time zone: UTC+2 (EET)
  - Summer (DST): UTC+3 (EEST)

Grigiškės (Polish: Grzegorzewo) is a city in the Vilnius city municipality, Lithuania. It is an industrial town with AB Grigiškės, a major paper factory built in 1923. Grigiškės is situated on both banks of the Vokė river, south of the river Neris.

== History ==
Mounds from the 5th to 10th centuries show that the surrounding lands have been inhabited for a long time. Kunigiškės, Kauno Vokė and Salos-Afindevičiai villages were there, with the modern Grigiškės settlement being founded only in the 20th century.

The name in 1923 was given by Grzegorz Kurec, an industrialist of Belarusian origin, who built a paper and cardboard factory and a water power plant with a unique Grigiškės water aqueduct.

In the aftermath of World War II, the factory was expanded, with many new workplaces being created. The town grew rapidly mainly due to the migration of Belarusian workers from Byelorussian Soviet Socialist Republic as well as Lithuanian deportees returning from Siberia, who were prohibited to live in Vilnius, settled here. In the Soviet era, Grigiškės factory also manufactured fiberboards.

On 15 May 1958, Grigiškės became an urban-type settlement and the first Lithuanian schools were established. In 1968, a library was built. On 10 December 1996, by the decree of the Lithuanian president, the Grigiškės coat-of-arms was finally validated. Since 19 March 2000 (official since 21 December 1999), Grigiškės has been part of the Vilnius city municipality.
