= Aurela =

Charter airline in Lithuania, 1996–2013

IATA	ICAO	Call sign
—	LSK	AURELA
- Founded: 1996; 30 years ago
- Ceased operations: 18 February 2013; 13 years ago
- Hubs: Vilnius International Airport
- Fleet size: 2
- Headquarters: Vilnius, Lithuania
- Key people: Valdas Barakauskas (CEO)

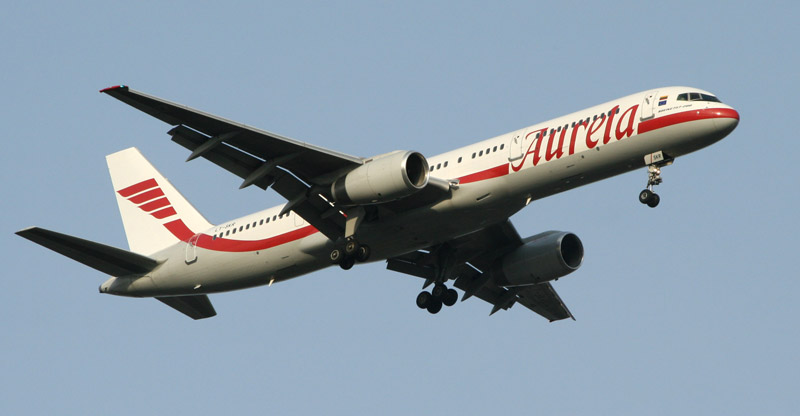
Aurela Boeing 757-200 landing at Vilnius Airport (VNO)

Aurela was a charter airline based in Vilnius, Lithuania. It operated charter services for several tour operators in the Baltic states. Its main base was Vilnius International Airport.

== History ==
The airline was established and started operations in 1996 as a joint-stock air company using a Tupolev Tu-134A. In 1995, Aurela Airlines became the first private aviation company in Lithuania.
In 1996, the company acquired a VIP configured aircraft, a TU-134A for charter flights.
In 2001, an eight-seater business class plane, Hawker HS-125-700, was purchased for VIP flights. Further demand on the market for chartered flights allowed the company to take a loan on a newer and more economical YAK-42D containing 120 seats.
In 2003, as the number of charter flights increased, the company rented out another YAK-42D.
In 2004, one YAK-42D was replaced with a more advanced and higher volume Boeing 737-300. The first flight of this plane coincided with Lithuania's membership in the European Community. Aurela was also used by Valdas Adamkus, the President of Lithuania. In 2004–2005, the President was taken to Kyiv during the Orange Revolution and to attend the funeral of Pope John Paul II.
In 2005, as soon as the EU had tightened its position in respects to the use of Russian aircraft, the company updated its fleet by acquiring western manufactured planes. In December, upon expiration of the rent agreement, the remaining YAK-42D was returned to the lessor.
In July 2006, a second Boeing 737-300 was rented out. In December, the company's shareholders purchased a brand new nine-seater plane, a Hawker 850XP for VIP charter flights. The same year, the key client for chartered flights had become Novaturas Travel Company.
In spring 2009, Aurela announced plans to expand its aircraft fleet by acquiring a Boeing 767-200. Aurela have signed a three-year contract with Thomas Cook airlines to provide them with Boeing 757-200 aircraft for summer months at its UK bases, and provides a charter service for Small Planet Airlines to Samos island and Limnos.

In 2011, January 7, the company's permanent flight license has been suspended. In May 31, the company was bought by Cyprus-registered company Servolian Investments. In July 15, the permanent flight license was renewed.

In 2012, Aurela began to operate several routes for Monarch Airlines due to Monarch opening new routes and not having sufficient fleet. Routes such as Birmingham to Málaga. Monarch ceased their partnership with Aurela in September 2012, due to extensive delays, customer complaints and an Aurela aircraft skidding off the runway at Birmingham Airport.

On 18 February 2013, the decision was taken by the Lithuanian CAA to suspend the licence of Aurela.

== Services ==
The core activities were:

- Regular charter Flights – one of the key operational activities by Aurela was travel agencies chartered flights to different resorts in Europe, Asia and Africa.
- Individual charter Flights – Aurela Airlines organizes individual or so-called exclusive charter flights.
- ACMI Lease – Aurela provided aircraft with all maintenance and crew including engineers to a lessee. In 2006 Aurela had a successful cooperation with Estonian Air. One of the aircraft was leased to the Estonian company for three and a half months. Airlines such as airBaltic, Small Planet Airlines and Star1 Airlines also hired the service, when necessary.
- VIP Flights – Aurela was the only aviation company in Lithuania operating a commercial category, VIP class aircraft.

== Fleet ==
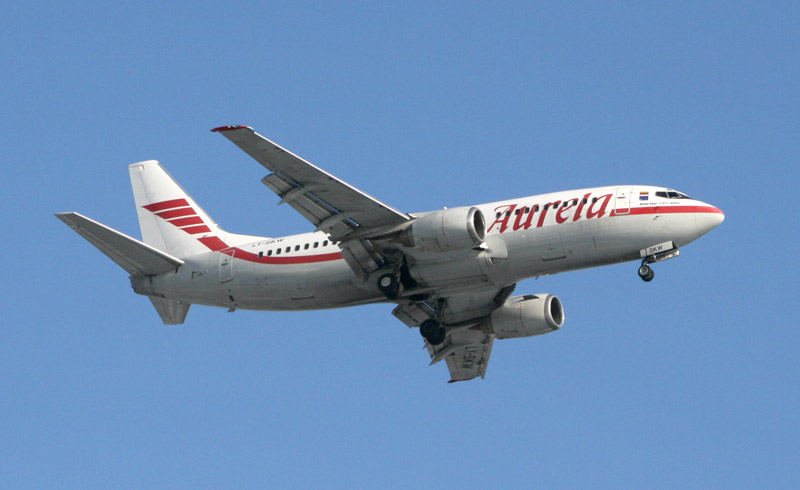
Aurela Boeing 737-300 landing at Vilnius Airport (VNO)

Aurela had various aircraft types, including:

- 1 Hawker 850XP
- 1 Hawker 900XP
- 2 Boeing 757-200
- 1 Tupolev Tu-134
- 2 Yakovlev Yak-42D
- 1 British Aerospace BAe 125
- 2 Boeing 737-300
