= Grigeo AB =

Lithuanian paper and wood industry company group

AB Grigeo
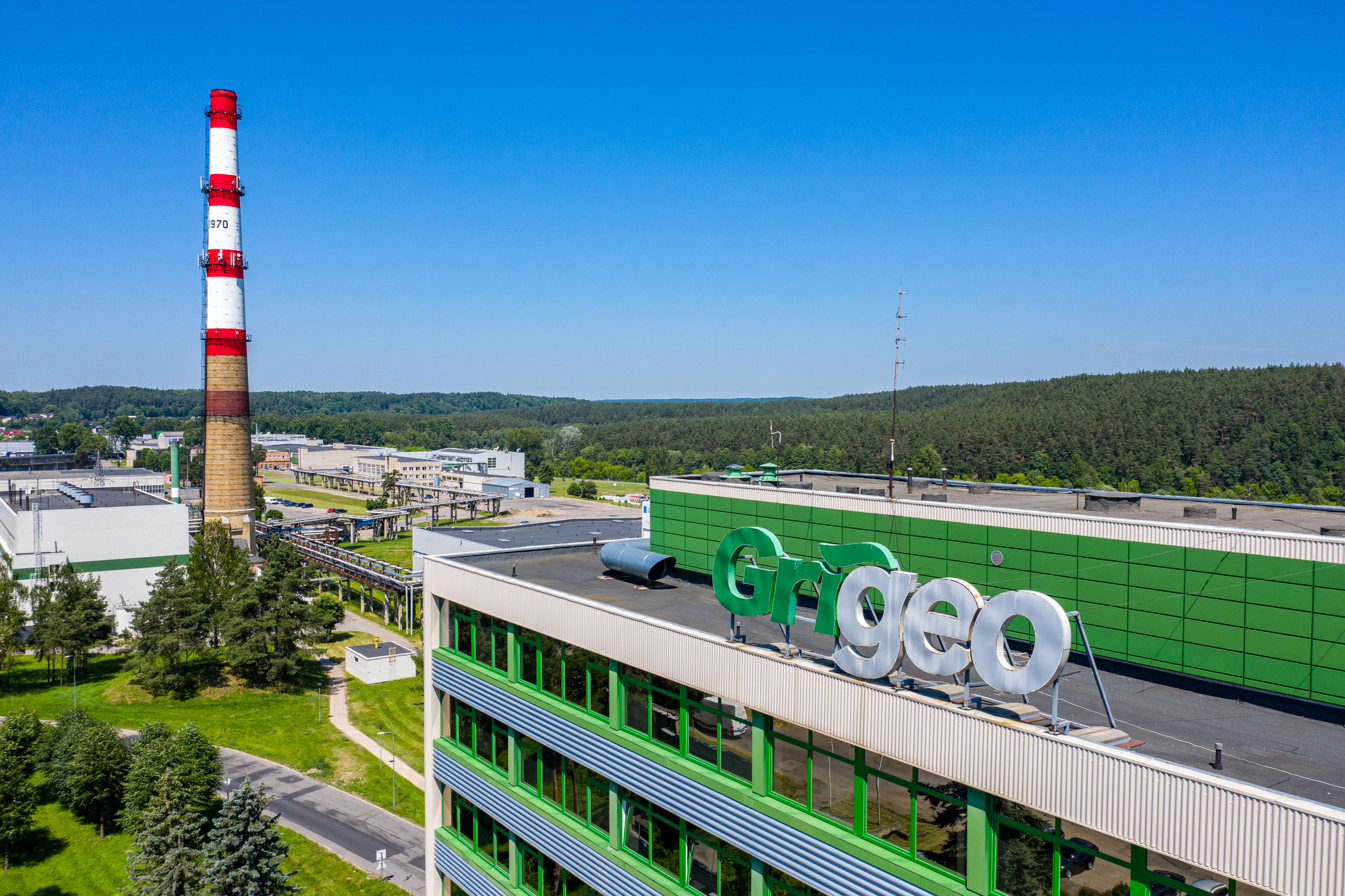
- Type: Public
- Traded as: GRG1L
- Industry: Paper manufacturing
- Founded: 1923; 103 years ago in Grigiškės, Lithuania
- Founder: Grzegorz Kurec
- Headquarters: Grigiškės, Lithuania
- Key people: Gintautas Pangonis (president)
- Products: Toilet paper; Paper towels and napkins; Corrugated cardboard and cartons; Hardboard and painted hardboard
- Operating income: Grigeo AB - €67.6 million (2021) Grigeo company group - €163.2 million (2021)

Grigeo AB (formerly Grigiškės AB) is a paper and wood industry company group in Lithuania, and one of the biggest in the Baltic states.

The group comprises the following companies: Grigeo AB, Grigeo Packaging UAB, Grigeo Klaipėda AB, Grigeo Baltwood UAB, Grigeo Recycling UAB, Grigeo Recycling SIA, and Mena Pak AT.

The group employs eight hundred employees. Yearly turnover is approximately €163 million.

Grigeo AB is a member of the Lithuanian Forest association, Grigeo Baltwood UAB - a member of the European Panel Federation EPF and Grigeo Packaging UAB – a member of the European Federation of Corrugated Board Manufacturers FEFCO. It is the first paper production company in Lithuania, which has been awarded with the IFS HPC Quality Certificate. The company is certified by Ecolabel, SWAN, FSC and other certificates

Grigiškės aqueduct – a protected technical monument – sits on company territory.

== History ==
Grigiškės paper factory was founded in 1923. Grzegorz Kurec, a mechanic, hydraulic engineer, and businessman, built the factory at the confluence of Neris and Vokė rivers. The factory started operating in 1925.

In 1936, the company began production of white cardboard, cardboard boxes, and wrapping paper. Before the war, 300 employees worked there. The factory was demolished and burned down on 12 July 1944, when the German army was retreating. It took more than a year to rebuild. From 1980 to 1985, Grigiškės factory was the biggest cellulose and paper production company in Lithuania and employed almost 3000 workers. Grigiškės paper mill managed the Pabradė and Naujieji Verkiai factories.

Grigiškės AB was established in 1991. In November 2003, Grigiškės AB merged with Naujieji Verkiai AB. In order to build a sawmill, Baltwood UAB was established. In 2010, Grigiškės AB acquired Klaipėdos Kartonas AB, under the name Grigeo Klaipėda AB. The trademark Grigeo has been in use since 2015. In January 2019, Grigeo AB transferred the production of corrugated cardboard to the subsidiary Grigeo Packaging UAB, which was founded in 2009.

== Products ==
Grigeo AB group produces tissue paper, container-board and honeycomb, corrugated cardboard and packaging, and fibreboard. The group manufactures its products under the principle of circular economy: used paper and packaging is reinjected into the production process.

Household products include toilet paper, kitchen towels, folded towels, handkerchiefs, and facial tissue. Business products include toilet paper, paper towels, wiping paper, sanitary pads, paper napkins, dispensers, liquid and foam soap.

== Management ==
Alongside the parent company, Grigeo AB also owns the following main subsidiaries:

- Grigeo Klaipėda AB – the biggest cardboard production and paper packaging recycling company in the Baltic states;
- Grigeo Packaging UAB – corrugated cardboard, food and drink packaging, furniture packaging, and individual orders of packaging;
- Grigeo Baltwood UAB – fibreboard, painted and unpainted fibreboard furniture and packaging;
- Grigeo Recycling UAB – prepares secondary materials for production; and
- Mena Pak AT - manufacturer of corrugated cardboard in Ukraine.

Grigeo AB stocks are part of the Nasdaq Vilnius AB Official Baltic State stock exchange list of securities, under stock symbol GRG1L.

== Recognition ==
Grigeo AB has been recognised by markets in Lithuania, Latvia, Estonia, and Scandinavia.

- Brand of The Year, issued by Verslo žinios together with market research company Nielsen
- Lithuanian Product of the Year
