= Ekspla =

EKSPLA
- Type: Joint stock company
- Industry: Scientific lasers High-technology
- Founded: 1983 in Vilnius, Lithuania
- Headquarters: Vilnius, Lithuania
- Key people: CEO Kestutis Jasiunas
- Products: Solid-state lasers Optical parametric oscillators Optical parametric generators Opto-electronic components Optical components Nonlinear optics crystals
- Services: Research and Development
- Revenue: €18.148 million
- Number of employees: 150 (2023)
- Website: www.ekspla.com

EKSPLA is a laser manufacturing company based in Lithuania. EKSPLA is known for their lasers and laser systems, as well as other photonics components. The company is supplying their products for scientific, OEM (Original Equipment Manufacturer) & industrial applications.

== History ==
All Lithuanian laser technology companies trace their roots to Vilnius University and the Institute of Physics. Members of Lithuanian Academy of Sciences and of the Institute of Physics organised an experimental workshop and established the EKSMA company in 1983. It represented the scientific instrumentation of the former Soviet Union.

In 1992, an EKSMA laser design and manufacturing spin-off named EKSPLA started operating as a separate legal entity. Gradual development of the company can be illustrated by its customer base expansion to Japan in 1993, and United States in 1996. Today it covers all the world.

The first EKSPLA commercial picosecond diode-pumped laser was developed in 2002. Currently, (2007) the company supplies more than 20 types of diode-pumped solid-state lasers.

In 2004, EKSMA became a holding company through acquisition of EKSPLA. The shareholders agreed to consolidate all laser and photonics related businesses of both companies into EKSPLA, and two divisions were established: Laser & Laser Systems and Photonics Components. Although company operates under the EKSPLA name, both EKSPLA and EKSMA trademarks are used for laser and components businesses.

Effective from 1 July 2008, all components business activities (covering optical components, laser & nonlinear crystals, positioning mechanics, mounts and optical tables) were moved from EKSPLA to an Optolita company with the brand name of and doing business as EKSMA OPTICS.

== Awards ==
In 2005, EKSPLA was awarded as the knowledge economy company of the year. The award was given as an acknowledgement of the company's constant investments and achievements in development and marketing of knowledge-based products, cooperation with research institutions, and support to the knowledge-based economy development projects.

In 2007, EKSPLA CEO Kestutis Jasiunas, together with other scientists and entrepreneurs (Dr. Romualdas Danielius, Dr. Rimantas Kraujalis and Prof. Habil. Dr. Algis Petras Piskarskas), received the Partnership Award of the National Advancement Awards. This was an acknowledgement of major contributions to Lithuania laser science and industry consolidation.

== Partnership ==
Ekspla has a successful track record of international collaboration in NATO and EUREKA programs. In 2002, Ekspla was appointed the first Lithuania-based coordinator of a European Union FP5 project.

The company participates in a number of research projects of Lithuanian State Science and Studies Foundation, with research groups from the Institute of Physics and Laser Research Centre at Vilnius University.

Ekspla is closely collaborating with other Lithuanian enterprises in the photonics field: Standa, Optida, and Light Conversion. In 2005–2007, these four companies carried out a successfully completed research and technological development project “Lasers for microprocessing and diagnostics” partially financed from EU Structural Funds. The purpose of the project was to develop a new type of laser meeting the requirements for industrial applications. Light Conversion and EKSPLA did the research work for development of high repetition rate, short pulse, high medium power diode-pumped lasers and investigated harmonic generation, and tunable optical parametric radiation. Such sources of radiation are supposed to be used in microprocessing. as well as other applications.

The company sells its products directly or through distributors. Distributors are found in China, Germany, Great Britain, France, India, Israel, Japan, Liechtenstein, Mexico, Poland, Romania, Russia, Switzerland, Taiwan, United States.
