= Heston Airlines =

Lithuanian charter airline

IATA	ICAO	Call sign
HN	HST	HESTON
- Founded: 2016; 10 years ago
- Commenced operations: 1 July 2021; 5 years ago
- Hubs: Vilnius Airport, Tallinn Airport
- Subsidiaries: Valletta Airlines
- Fleet size: 10
- Destinations: Charter
- Parent company: Heston Aviation
- Headquarters: Vilnius, Lithuania
- Key people: Jonas Rinkauskas (CEO)
- Website: heston.aero

Heston Airlines is a Lithuanian charter airline. It launched in 2021 and is based and headquartered in Vilnius.

== Operations ==
Heston Airlines does not maintain a scheduled route network but offers passenger and cargo charter flights on behalf of other airlines as well as ACMI operations.

Shortly after starting operations, Heston Airlines took over its first three Airbus A330 long-haul aircraft.

== Fleet ==
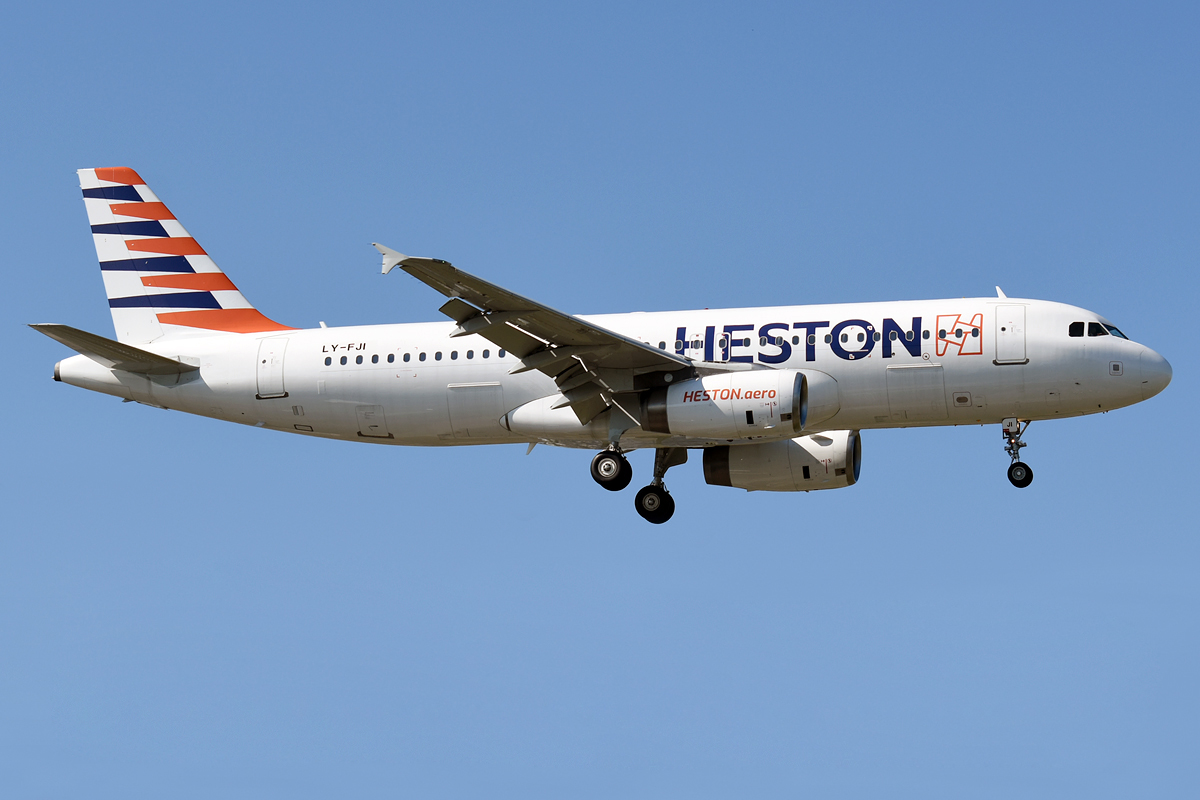
Heston Airlines Airbus A320-200

=== Current fleet ===
As of July 2026, Heston Airlines operates the following aircraft:

Aircraft	In service	Orders	Passengers		Notes
Aircraft	In service	Orders	C	Y	Notes
Airbus A320	10	—	—	180	
Airbus A320		—	12	144	
Airbus A320		—	—	186	
Airbus A320	Total	10	—		

=== Former fleet ===
As of July 2025, Heston Airlines operated 15 Airbus A320.

== See also ==
- List of airlines of Lithuania
