= Vilnius Airport =

Airport in Vilnius, Lithuania

Vilnius Čiurlionis International Airport Tarptautinis Vilniaus Čiurlionio oro uostas

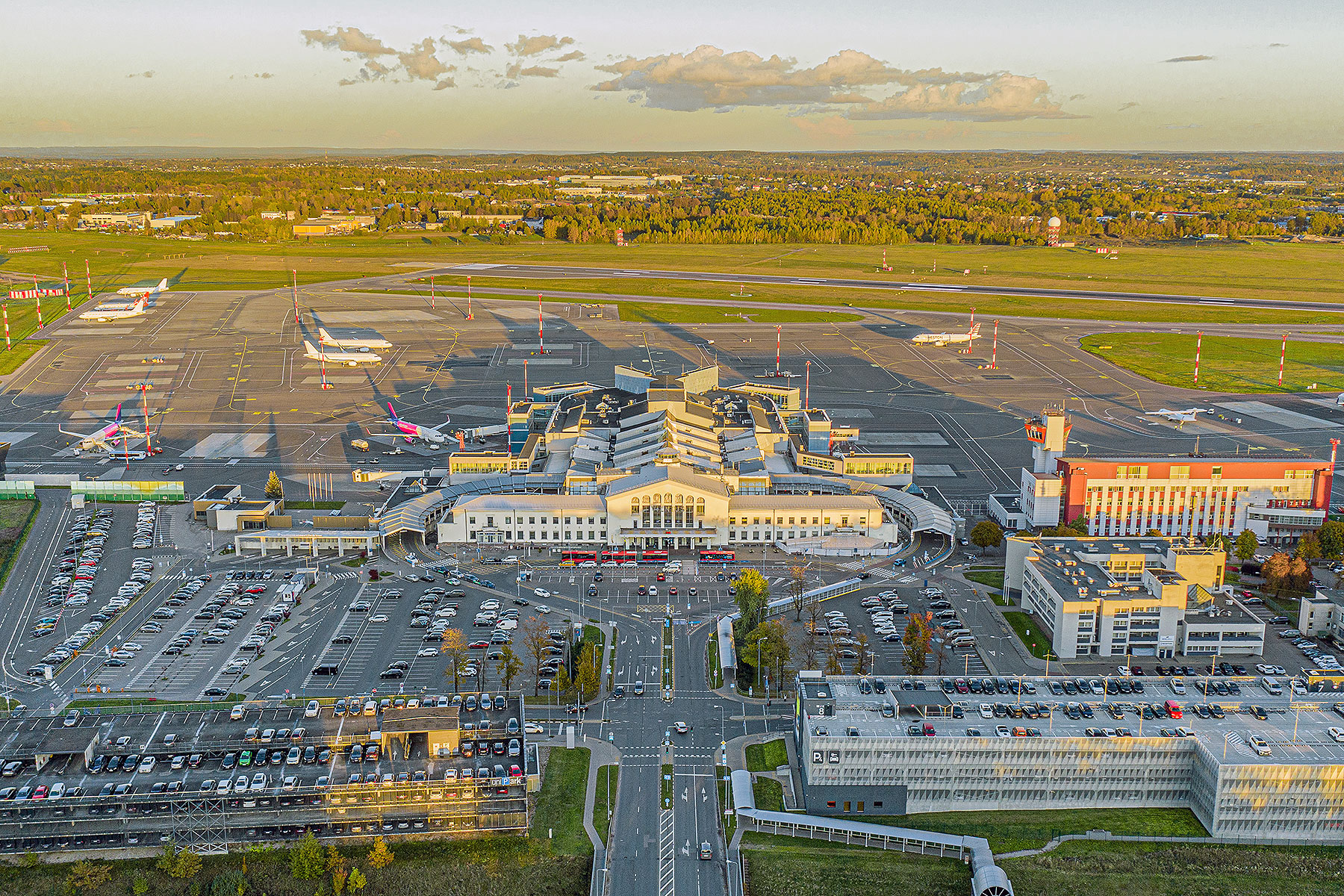
- IATA: VNO; ICAO: EYVI

Summary
- Airport type: Public
- Owner: Government of Lithuania
- Operator: JSC "Lithuanian Airports"
- Serves: Vilnius, Lithuania
- Opened: 1932
- Hub for: airBaltic
- Focus city for: GetJet Airlines; Ryanair; Wizzair
- Time zone: Eastern European Time (UTC+02:00)
- Elevation AMSL: 646 ft (197 m)
- Coordinates: 54°38′13″N 025°17′16″E
- Website: vno.lt

Map
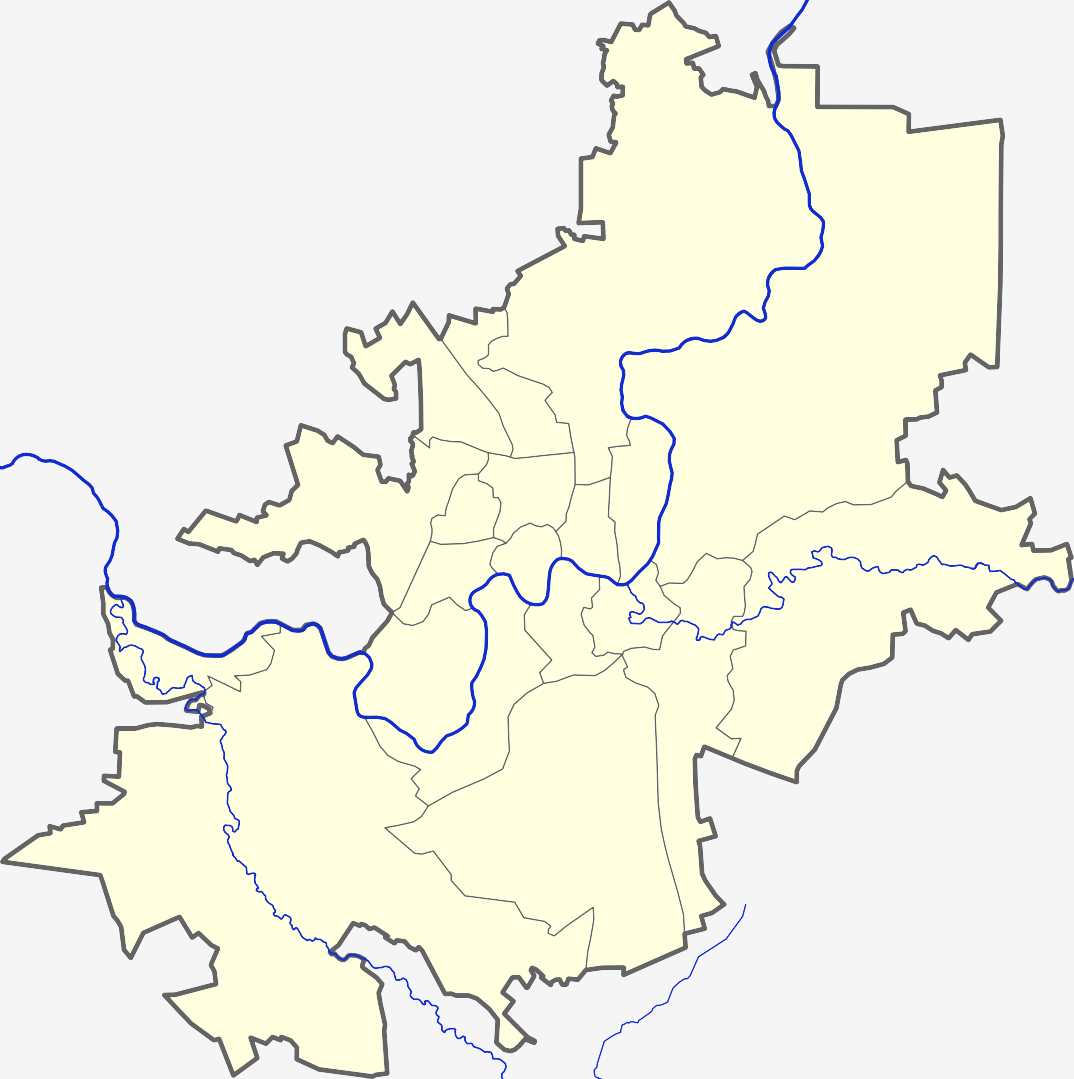
- Location within Vilnius VNO (Lithuania)

Runways
Direction	Length		Surface
Direction	m	ft	Surface
01/19	2,515	8,250	Asphalt/concrete

Statistics (2019)
- Number of passengers: 5,004,921
- Passenger change 18–19: ▲1.7%
- Aircraft movements: 47,440
- Movements change 18–19: ▲0.5%
- Cargo (tonnes): 13,974
- Cargo change 18–19: ▲9.4%
- Source: Lithuanian Airports, 2020

Vilnius Čiurlionis International Airport (IATA: VNO, ICAO: EYVI) (Lithuanian: Tarptautinis Vilniaus Čiurlionio oro uostas) is the airport of Vilnius, the capital of Lithuania. It is located 5.9 km (3.7 mi) south of the city center. It is the largest of the three commercial airports in Lithuania by passenger traffic, with one runway and 5 million passengers a year. It is the second busiest airport in the Baltic states, after Riga International Airport, the 17th-busiest airport in post-Soviet states, and the 96th busiest airport in Europe. Vilnius International Airport serves as a base for airBaltic, Ryanair, and Wizz Air. The airport is managed by Joint Stock Company Lithuanian Airports under the Ministry of Transport and Communications. In honor of Mikalojus Konstantinas Čiurlionis, the airport was renamed to Vilnius Čiurlionis International Airport (Lithuanian: Tarptautinis Vilniaus Čiurlionio oro uostas) from 1 January 2025, to 31 December 2029.

== History ==
=== Early years ===
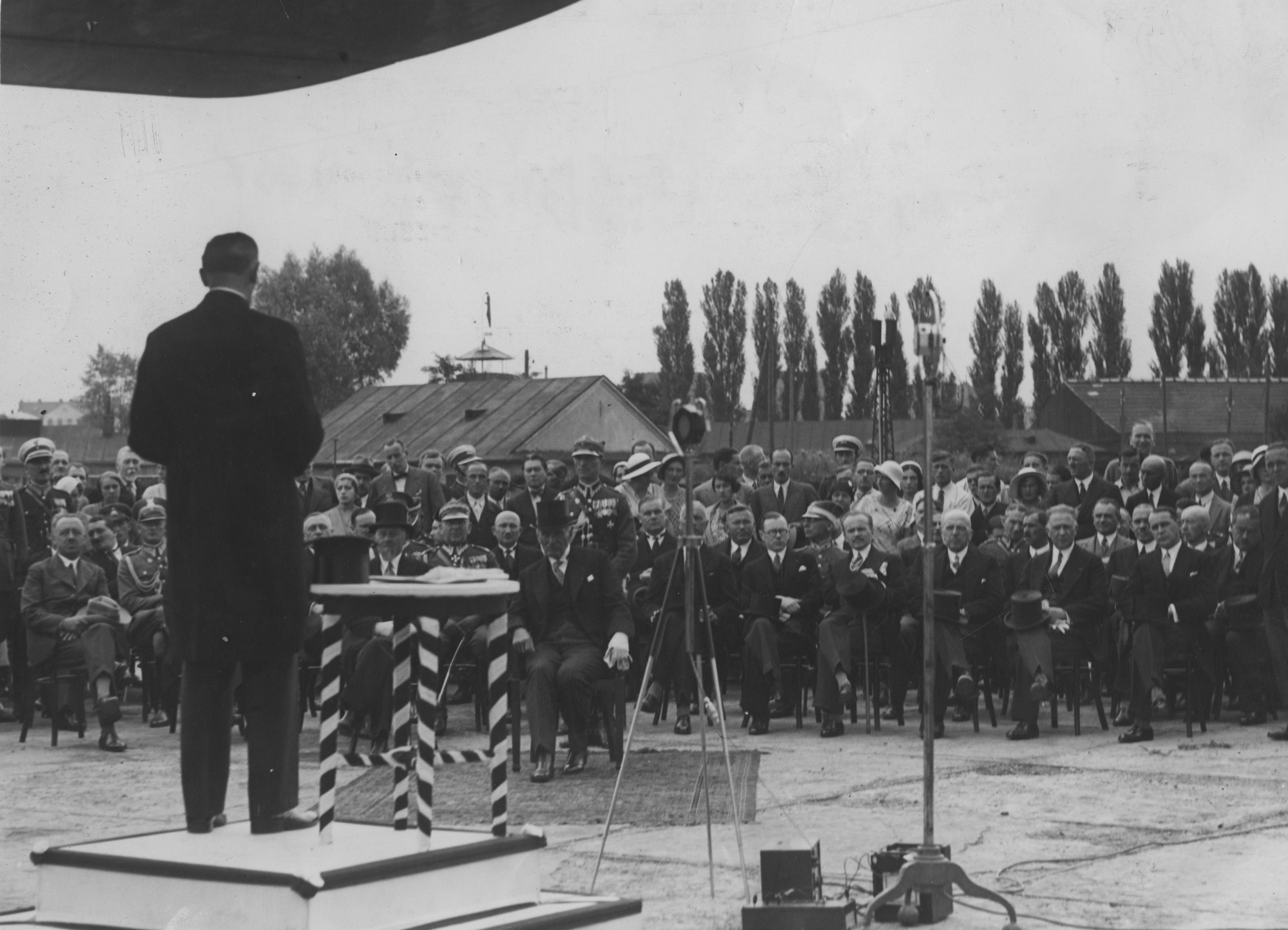
The opening of the Warsaw–Vilnius–Riga–Tallinn airline on 17 August 1932

The airport began operations in Second Polish Republic on 17 August 1932 as Wilno–Porubanek, Porubanek was the name of the neighbouring village which today is part of the Kirtimai district of Vilnius. Before World War II, it operated the then-domestic route between Wilno (Vilnius) and Warsaw as well as international route to Riga. Since 15 April 1939, it inaugurated a new route to Kaunas. The airport was used as a military airfield during the war. The airport resumed its activity as a civil airport as of 17 July 1944.

=== Recent developments ===
Lithuanian Airlines (branded later as FlyLAL) was established as the Lithuanian flag carrier following independence in 1991 and inherited the Vilnius-based Aeroflot fleet of Tupolev Tu-134, Yakovlev Yak-40, Yak-42 and Antonov An-24, An-26 aircraft, but rapidly replaced these Soviet-era aircraft types with modern Boeing 737 and Boeing 757 jets and Saab 340, Saab 2000 turboprops. Operations were suspended effective 17 January 2009 as a result of growing financial difficulties. With the collapse of flyLAL, the airport lost its scheduled services to Amsterdam, Budapest, Istanbul, Madrid and Tbilisi. flyLAL used to operate to Dublin, Frankfurt, London, Milan and Paris in competition with Aer Lingus, airBaltic and Lufthansa.

AirBaltic, the national airline of Latvia and under Scandinavian Airlines part-ownership, opened up a second base at Vilnius in 2004 to complement its Riga operation and became the largest carrier at Vilnius, using Boeing 737 jets and Fokker 50 turboprops. At one point, airBaltic operated to 19 destinations from Vilnius but, in 2009, the network covered only three destinations served by two aircraft based at Vilnius.

Vilnius Airport is the main hub for Grand Cru Airlines and a base for Wizz Air. It used to be a main hub for Star1 Airlines until their end of operations in September 2010 and Aurela until Aurela had lost its flight license. It was the hub for Small Planet Airlines and Aviavilsa until both airlines folded. The airport was a secondary hub for airBaltic, Estonian Air and Skyways Express until they closed the bases in Vilnius.

On 30 June 2013, Air Lituanica also began its flights from the Vilnius Airport and established its base there serving several European cities. However, by 22 May 2015, the airline shut down all operations as well.

The airport was closed for 35 days from 14 July 2017 to 17 August 2017 (inclusive) for runway reconstruction work, with all flights diverted to Kaunas Airport.

In 2025, the airport was closed on several occasions due to helium-filled weather balloons flying near the airport from Belarus being used to smuggle black-market cigarettes into the European Union.

== Terminal ==
Vilnius International Airport terminal building

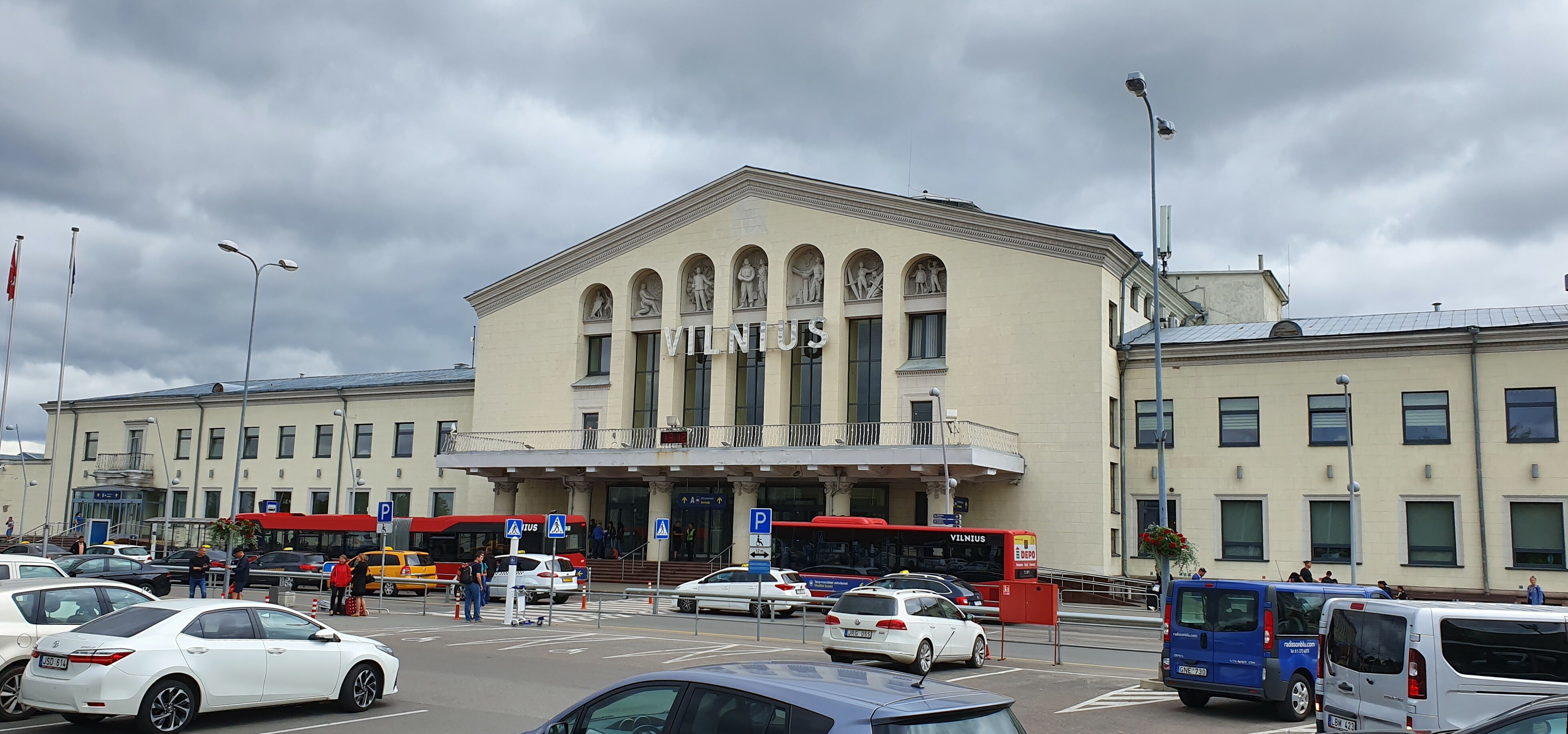
Main entrance to the airport

The original terminal was built in 1934–1936 to a design by Józefa Mrówkowa-Ochmańska; Stanisław Połujan was the construction manager. The three-story building was designed in modernist style, and had a restaurant with a terrace, a hotel for passengers, a newspaper kiosk, a customs post, a police station and a post office. The building was criticized for its overly luxurious interior design and size, which was unsuitable for the small, nascent civilian air traffic in Vilnius.

The construction of the current airport building started in 1949 and completed in 1954. It features a standard 1950s Soviet airport terminal design, originally intended for an airport with up to 20 aircraft movements per day. On the outside, it is decorated with sculptures of soldiers, workers and aviators, while inside walls and ceilings feature wreaths, bay leaves and stars, and until the early 1990s, the Soviet hammer and sickle, typical decor for Soviet public buildings of early post-war years.

A new departure terminal, connected with the old building, was built in 1993. Since then, the old building has been used as the arrival terminal only.

In November 2007, the new 1,000 m^{2} (10,764 sq ft) terminal building was opened for operations which improved the capacity and facilities of the airport and complies with the requirements of the Schengen agreement. The passenger throughput of the terminal increased, passenger service quality was improved and more stringent aviation security measures were implemented. The new area of the renovated passenger terminal now reaches 3,462 m^{2} (37,265 sq ft). It is equipped with 6 passenger boarding bridges, modern passenger check-in equipment, new travel value and duty-free shops were opened as well as business lounge and VIP Lounge.

== New departure terminal ==
The 2025 departure terminal

Construction of a new departure terminal at Vilnius Airport started in January 2023. After the completion of this 14,400 m^{2} (155,000 sq ft) terminal, the total area of Vilnius Airport passenger terminal increased by one third, and passenger throughput doubled – from 1,200 passengers per hour to 2,400. Together with the construction of the new terminal, a redevelopment of road infrastructure is planned, including upgrades of engineering networks and a new transport scheme. The terminal was opened on 4 February 2025. with projected cost of 50.2 million euros.

== Airlines and destinations ==
=== Passenger ===
The following airlines operate regular scheduled and charter flights to and from Vilnius:

Airlines	Destinations
Aegean Airlines	Seasonal: Athens
Air Montenegro	Seasonal charter: Tivat
airBaltic	Amsterdam, Düsseldorf, Hamburg, Kraków, Lisbon, Málaga, Munich, Paris–Charles de Gaulle, Riga, Tallinn, Zurich (ends 8 october 2026); Seasonal: Dubai–International, Geneva (begins 2 January 2027), Gran Canaria, Heraklion (ends 31 October 2026), Sandefjord, Tenerife–South, Tirana, Turin
arkia	Seasonal: Tel Aviv
Austrian Airlines	Vienna
Avion Express	Seasonal charter: Antalya, Barcelona, Bergamo, Burgas, Catania, Enfidha, Faro, Funchal, Gazipaşa, Heraklion, Hurghada, Larnaca, Lamezia Terme, Lyon, Rhodes, Salzburg, Sharm El Sheikh, Tenerife–South, Tivat, Zakynthos
Brussels Airlines	Brussels
Finnair	Helsinki
flydubai	Dubai–International
FLYYO	Seasonal charter: Tel Aviv
GetJet Airlines	Seasonal charter: Antalya, Barcelona, Bodrum, Burgas, Corfu, Funchal, Gazipaşa, Heraklion, Hurghada, Lamezia Terme, Málaga, Marsa Alam, Olbia, Palma de Mallorca, Patras, Rhodes, Rimini, Salzburg, Sharm El Sheikh, Tenerife–South, Varna
Heston Airlines	Seasonal charter: Antalya, Bodrum, Dalaman, Heraklion, Hurghada, Kavala, Sharm El Sheikh, Tivat
Israir	Seasonal: Tel Aviv
LOT Polish Airlines	Warsaw–Chopin
Lufthansa	Frankfurt
Mavi Gök Airlines	Seasonal charter: Antalya
Norwegian Air Shuttle	Oslo; Seasonal: Stockholm–Arlanda
Ryanair	Barcelona, Beauvais, Bergamo, Berlin, Bremen, Dublin, Eindhoven, Hahn, London–Luton, London–Stansted, Malta, Nuremberg, Oslo, Rome–Ciampino, Rome–Fiumicino, Turin, Vienna; Seasonal: Athens, Corfu
Scandinavian Airlines	Copenhagen, Stockholm–Arlanda
Skyline Express	Seasonal charter: Hurghada
SkyUp	Seasonal charter: Hambantota—Mattala
Swiss International Air Lines	Zurich
Turkish Airlines	Istanbul
Wizz Air	Barcelona, Bergen, Budapest, Catania, Dortmund, Eindhoven, Gdańsk, Kraków, Kutaisi, Larnaca, London–Luton, Málaga, Milan–Malpensa, Nice, Podgorica, Prague, Tallinn, Tel Aviv, Turku; Seasonal: Grenoble, Reykjavík–Keflavík, Tirana

=== Cargo ===
Airlines	Destinations
DHL Aviation	Leipzig/Halle, Riga
Turkish Cargo	Istanbul

== Statistics ==
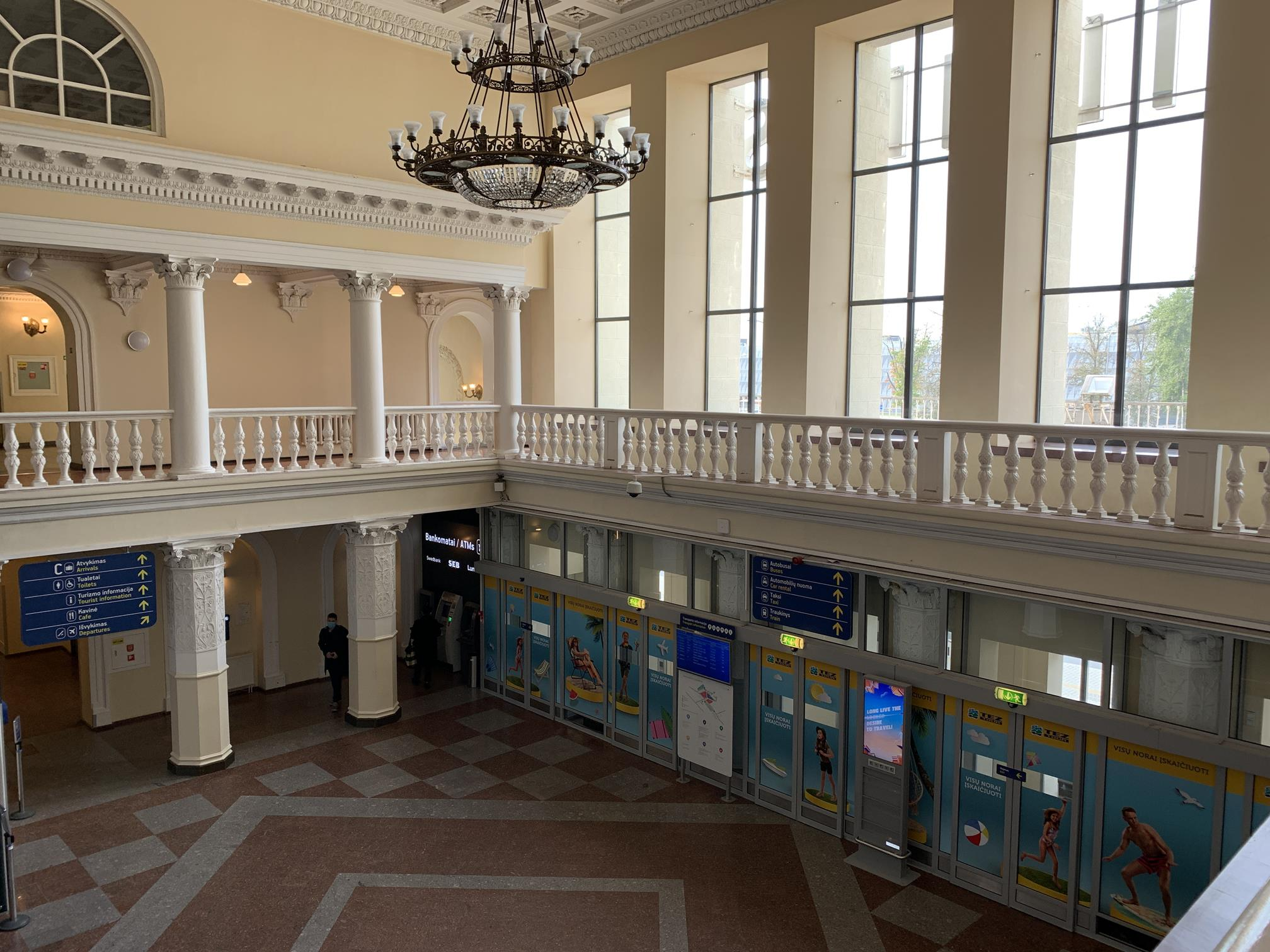
Interior of the historic entrance hall

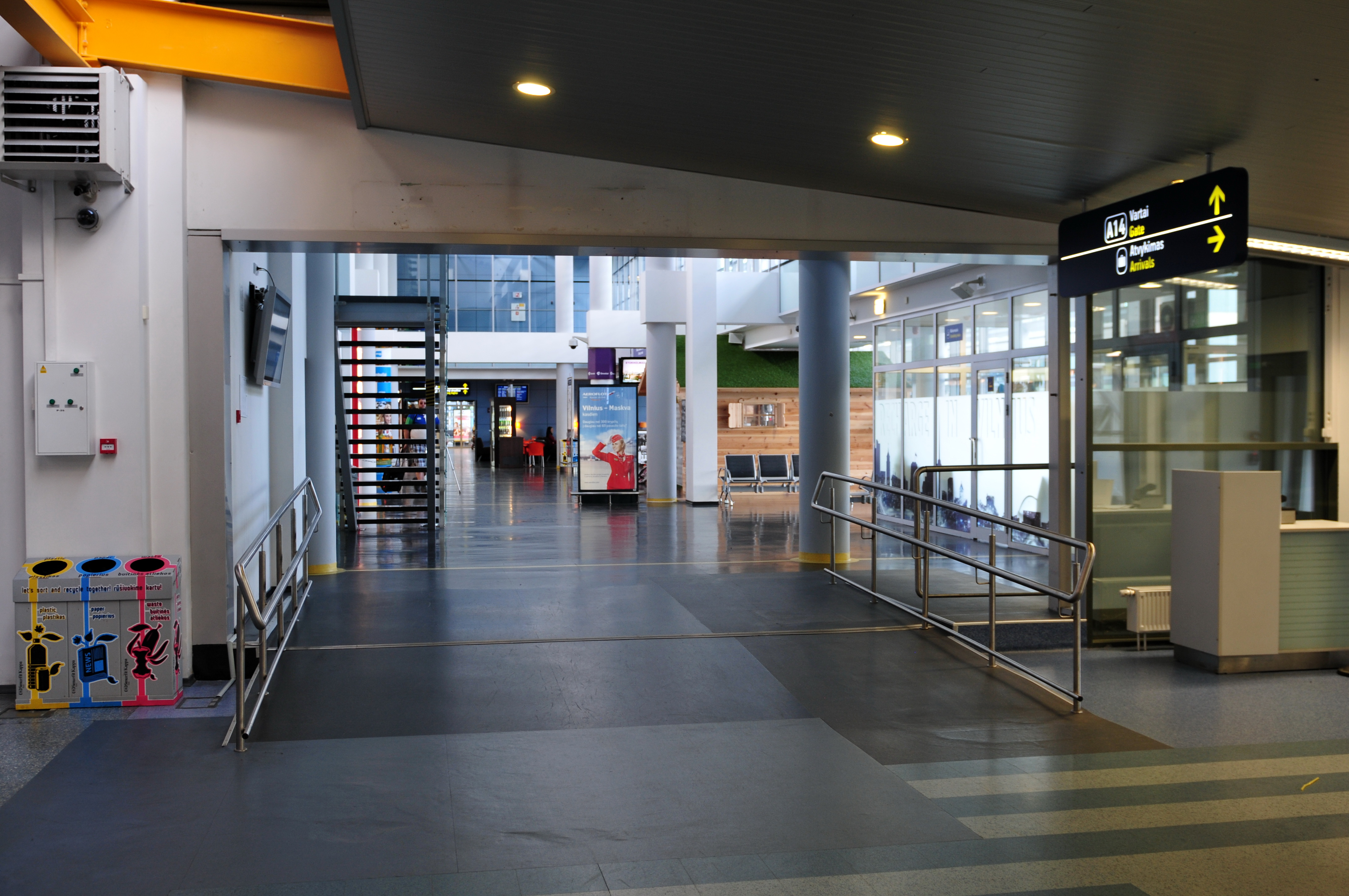
Departures area

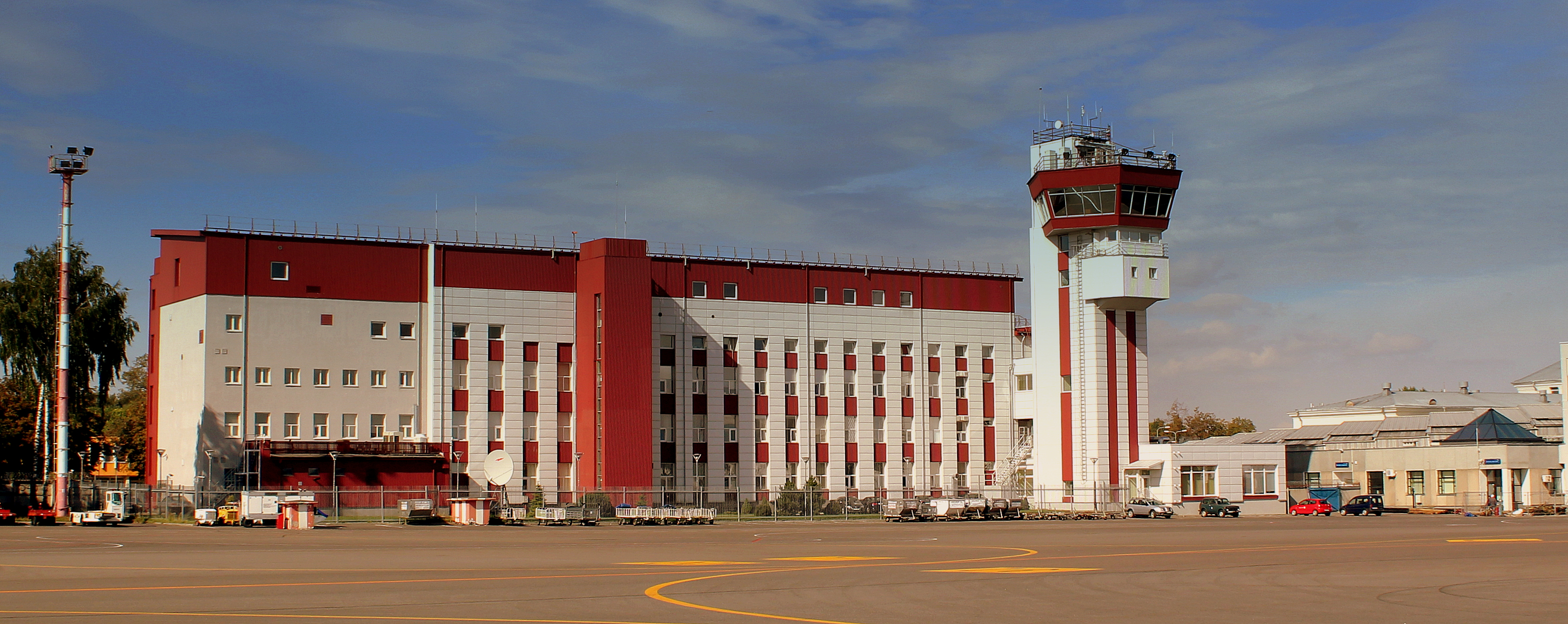
Control tower

=== Annual traffic ===
Annual passenger traffic
Year	Passengers	% change	Change
2024	4,803,725	▲9.0%	▲397,706
2023	4,406,019	▲12.5%	▲490,149
2022	3,915,870	▲106.2%	▲2,017,053
2021	1,898,817	▲44.7%	▲585,349
2020	1,312,468	▼73.8%	▼3,692,453
2019	5,004,921	▲1.7%	▲81,972
2018	4,922,949	▲30.9%	▲1,161,112
2017	3,761,837	▼1.4%	▼52,164
2016	3,814,001	▲14.3%	▲477,917
2015	3,336,084	▲13.4%	▲393,414
2014	2,942,670	▲10.6%	▲280,801
2013	2,661,869	▲20.6%	▲453,773
2012	2,208,096	▲28.9%	▲495,629
2011	1,712,467	▲24.7%	▲338,608
2010	1,373,859	▲5.0%	▲65,227
2009	1,308,632	▼36.1%	▼739,807
2008	2,048,439	▲19.3%	▲331,217
2007	1,717,222	▲18.3%	▲265,754
2006	1,451,468	▲13.2%	▲169,596
2005	1,281,872	▲33.0%	▲317,708
2004	964,164	Steady	Steady

=== Busiest routes ===
Top 20 busiest routes from Vilnius in 2024
Rank	Airport	Passengers	Airlines
1	Antalya	375,441	Avion Express, Freebird Airlines, GetJet Airlines, Heston Airlines, Mavi Gök Airlines, Turkish Airlines
2	Warsaw-Chopin	287,412	LOT Polish Airlines
3	Riga	254,129	airBaltic
4	Frankfurt	232,886	Lufthansa
5	London-Luton	214,486	Ryanair, Wizz Air
6	Istanbul	184,889	Turkish Airlines
7	Oslo	162,543	Ryanair, Norwegian Air Shuttle
8	Rome-Fiumicino	154,022	Ryanair, Wizz Air
9	Barcelona	145,262	Ryanair, Wizz Air
10	Copenhagen	143,904	Scandinavian Airlines
11	Helsinki	135,864	Finnair
12	Stockholm-Arlanda	131,703	Norwegian Air Shuttle, Scandinavian Airlines, Ryanair
13	London-Stansted	125,296	Ryanair
14	Berlin	123,736	airBaltic, Ryanair
15	Bergamo	116,159	Ryanair
16	Eindhoven	114,278	Ryanair, Wizz Air
17	Vienna	109,512	Austrian Airlines, Ryanair
18	Beauvais	95,755	Ryanair, Wizz Air
19	Amsterdam	88,789	airBaltic
20	Heraklion	81,792	airBaltic, Avion Express, GetJet Airlines, Heston Airlines

=== Most frequent routes ===
Top ten most frequent routes from Vilnius as of July 2025
Rank	City	Flights per week
1	Warsaw-Chopin	~33
3	Helsinki	~29
2	Riga	~25
4	Frankfurt	~18
5	Amsterdam	~14
6	London-Luton	~14
8	Istanbul-International	~13
7	Oslo-Gardermoen	~13
9	Barcelona	~10
10	Vienna	~9

== Ground transportation ==
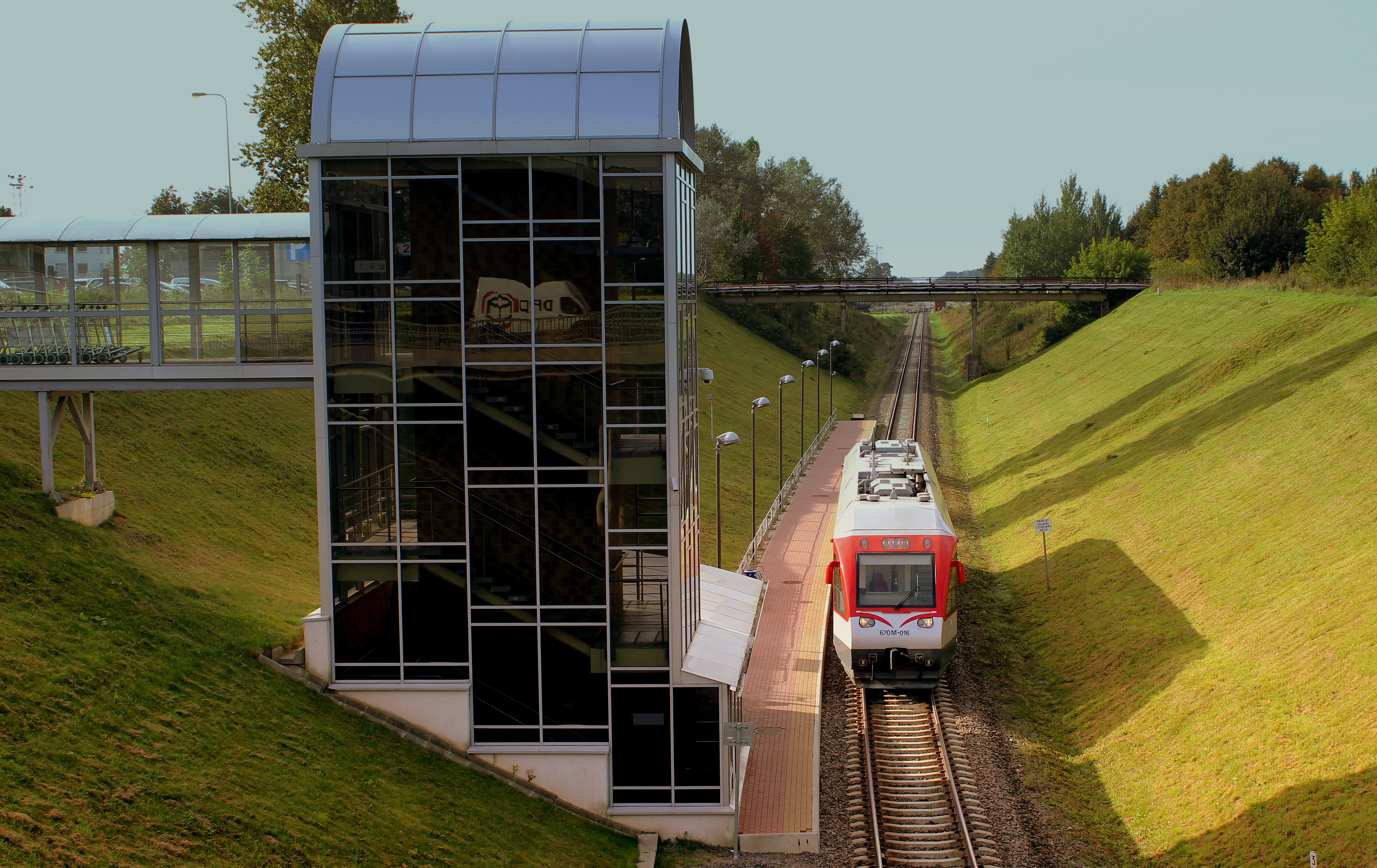
Vilnius airport railway station

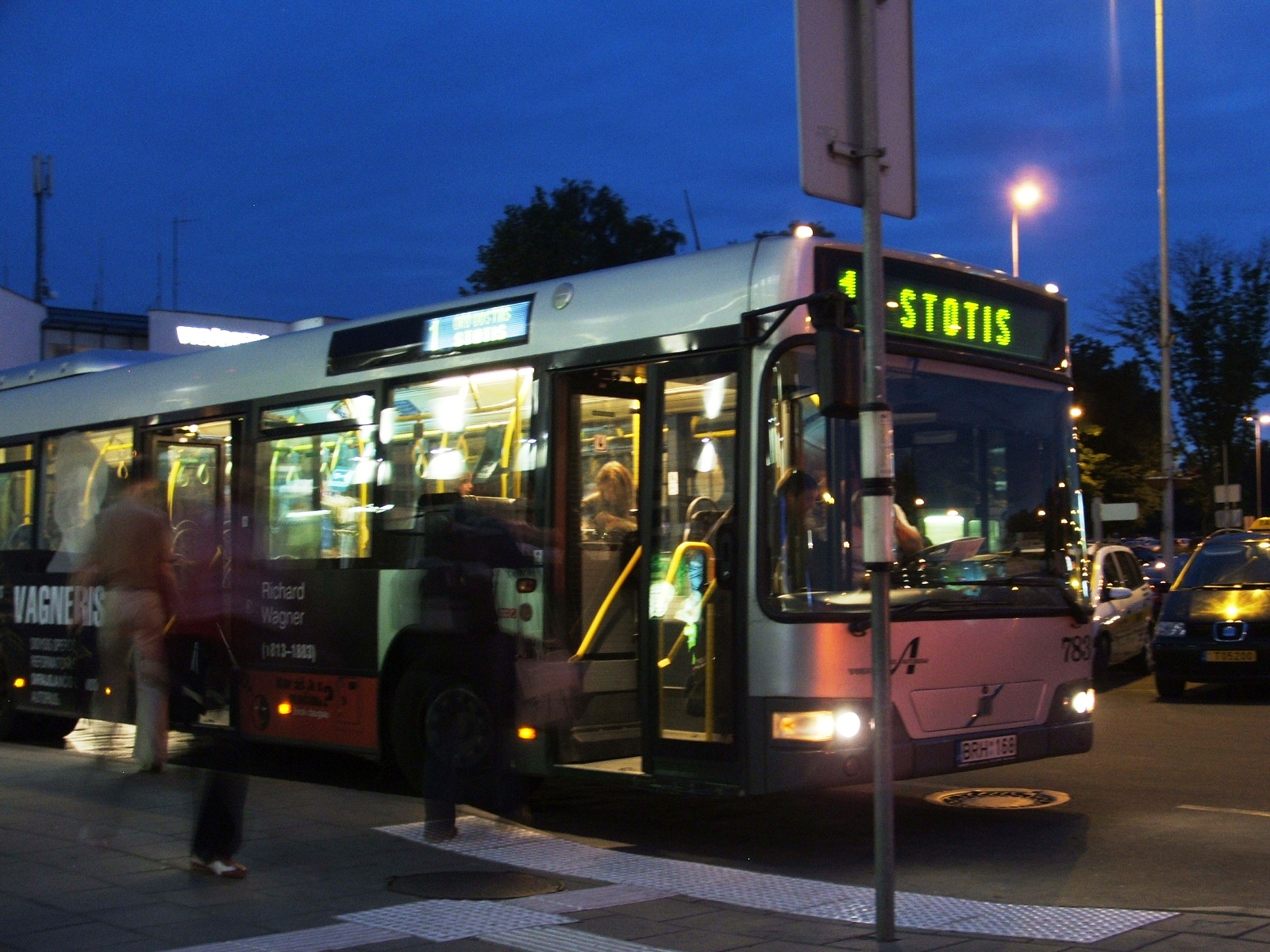
The bus connecting the airport with Vilnius

=== Train ===
Direct train services between Vilnius Airport Railway Station (referred to as "Oro uostas" in the schedules) and the central station of Vilnius were started in October 2008. Distance from the Airport to the Vilnius Central Railway Station (LTG Link) is 4.3 kilometres (2.7 mi), the journey takes 8 minutes.

=== Bus ===
The direct intercity express services operate from the Airport to Klaipėda, Palanga, Minsk and Daugavpils. Also, the Latvian company Flybus.lv operates service from Vilnius airport to Riga (via Panevėžys and Bauska).

=== Public transportation ===
City's public buses operate from the airport. Tickets can be bought from: Trafi, M.Ticket. Also, the company Toks transports passengers from the bus station to Vilnius airport and back by microbuses.

== Aviation services ==
Passenger handling, aircraft handling, into-plane fueling and de-icing/anti-icing services are handled by BGS and Litcargus.
Pilot training is conducted at Kyviškės airfield, a non-commercial airport about 25 kilometers from Vilnius Airport.

== Incidents and accidents ==
- Scandinavian Airlines Flight 2748, operated with Dash-8-400 (LN-RDS) with 48 passengers and 4 crew members, took off from Copenhagen Airport on 12 September 2007. It was heading to Palanga, Lithuania, but was diverted to Vilnius Airport (better suited for an emergency landing) when landing gear problems were discovered before landing. Upon touchdown, the right landing gear collapsed. All passengers and crew were evacuated safely. The local officials at the Vilnius International Airport noted that this was the most serious incident in recent years. This accident, along with the Aalborg accident just days earlier, caused all SAS Dash 8 Q400 planes to be grounded until the beginning of October of that year.
- On 23 May 2021, Ryanair Flight 4978, operated using a Boeing 737-8AS with 171 passengers on board, traveling in Belarusian airspace en route from Athens to Vilnius, was intercepted by a Belarusian MiG-29 before it could reach Lithuanian airspace. It was then forced to land at Minsk National Airport. Upon landing, the Belarusian KGB arrested two of the passengers, opposition activist Roman Protasevich and his girlfriend Sofia Sapega. The other passengers were allowed to reboard the plane to depart for Vilnius after seven hours.
- On 21 June 2023, the runway was closed after Brussels Airlines Flight 2372, set to fly to Brussels Airport could not take off as a landing gear tire popped while taxiing.
- On 3 February 2024, the airport was closed after Avion Express Flight 8242, landing from Milan Bergamo Airport slid off the runway upon touchdown.
- On 25 November 2024, Swiftair Flight 5960 (operated by a Boeing 737-476SF) crashed on approach to the airport, killing one person and injuring three.
- On 26 November 2025, the airport was closed after LOT Flight 771, landing from Warsaw Chopin Airport veered off the taxiway after touchdown.

== See also ==
- List of airports in Lithuania
- List of largest airports in the Baltic states
- List of the busiest airports in Europe
- List of the busiest airports in the former Soviet Union
- Transport in Lithuania
