= Aviavilsa =

Lithuanian cargo airline

IATA	ICAO	Call sign
–	LVR	AVIAVILSA
- Founded: 1999
- Ceased operations: 2018
- Hubs: Vilnius Airport
- Fleet size: 3
- Headquarters: Vilnius, Lithuania
- Website: www.aviavilsa.lt

Aviavilsa was a cargo airline based in Vilnius, Lithuania.

== History ==
It was established in 1998, and started operations in 1999. It operated cargo services within Europe as well as to Asia and Africa for clients such as the United Nations. Its main base was Vilnius Airport. The ATR-42 was on lease to AlbaStar and flying in Sardinia. One of the AN-26 aircraft flew long-term for DHL. The airline had ceased operations by 2018.

== Fleet ==
The Aviavilsa fleet included the following aircraft (as of 2012):

- 1 ATR 42-300
- 2 Antonov An-26, including one An-26B variant
