= Small Planet Airlines =

Lithuanian airline

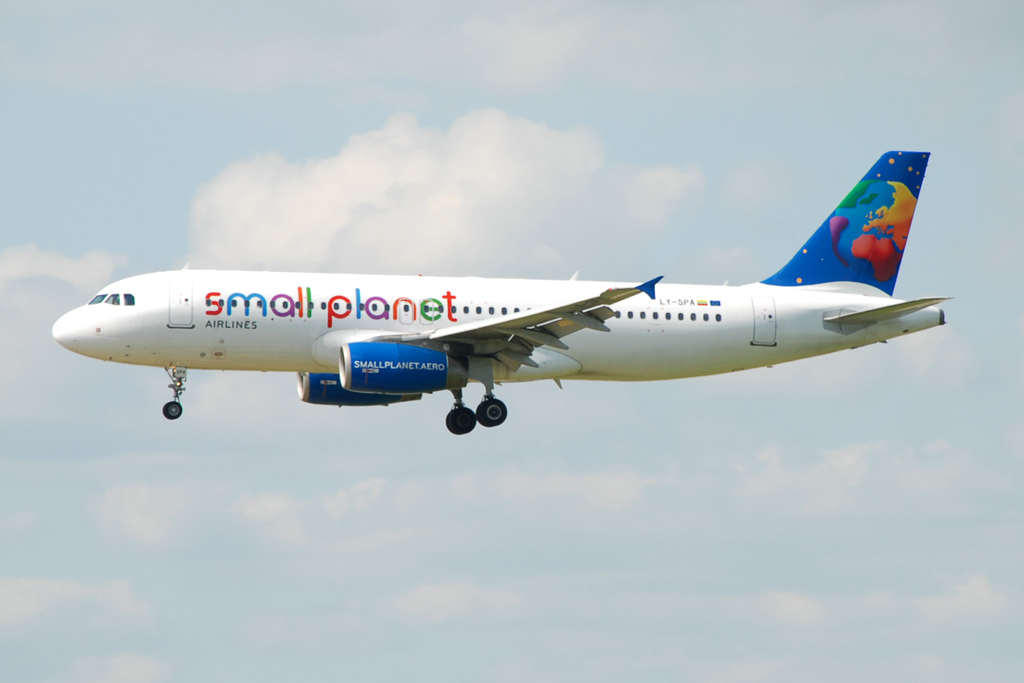
IATA	ICAO	Call sign
S5	LLC	SMALL PLANET
- Founded: 2007 as FlyLAL Charters
- Commenced operations: 2008
- Ceased operations: 28 November 2018
- Operating bases: Amsterdam Airport Schiphol; Vilnius Airport; Charles de Gaulle Airport; Chania International Airport; Stockholm Arlanda Airport
- Subsidiaries: Small Planet Airlines (Cambodia); Small Planet Airlines (Germany); Small Planet Airlines (Italy); Small Planet Airlines (Poland)
- Fleet size: 29
- Headquarters: J. Basanavičiaus g. 15, Vilnius, Lithuania
- Key people: Vytautas Kaikaris (CEO, Small Planet Group); Kristijonas Kaikaris (CEO, Small Planet Airlines); Andrius Staniulis (COO, Small Planet Airlines); Halldor Sigurdarson (CFO)
- Revenue: ▲€ 223.1 million (2016)
- Operating income: ▼€ 26 million (2016)
- Net income: ▼€ -3.8 million (2016)
- Website: smallplanet.aero

Small Planet Airlines was a Lithuanian leisure airline based at Vilnius Airport with further bases throughout Europe. It was the subsidiary of the Small Planet Group which also owned sister companies in Cambodia, Germany, Italy, and Poland, all of which are also now defunct.

== History ==
=== Foundation as FlyLAL Charters ===
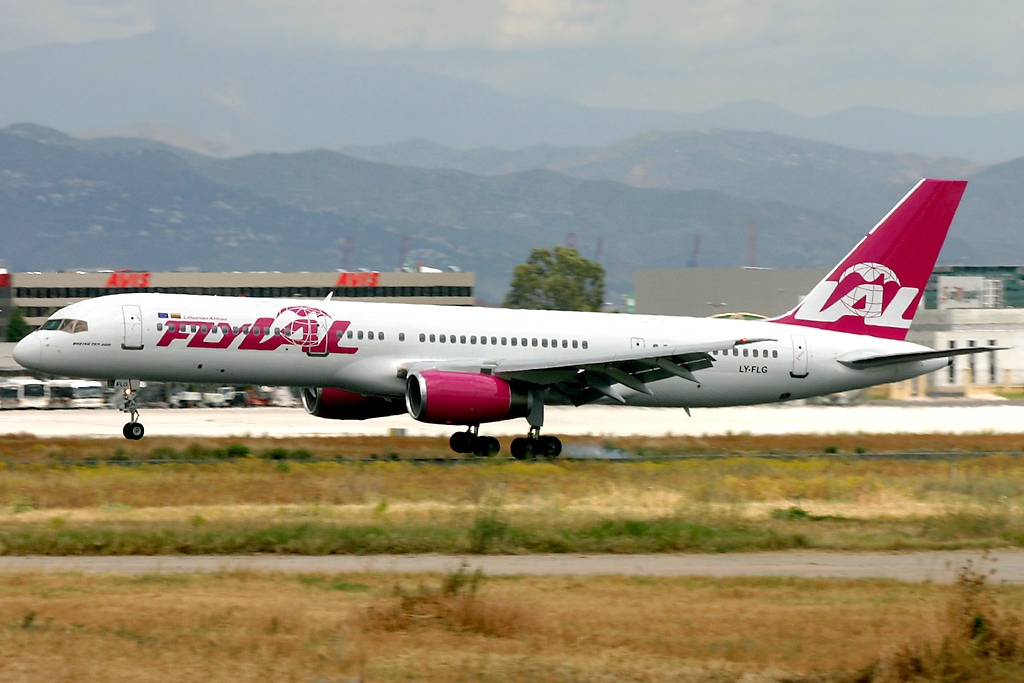
A Boeing 757-200 of flyLAL Charters in 2008

The company was previously known as FlyLAL Charters and was registered on 14 March 2007. In October 2008, the company received its operational licenses to begin passenger flight operations. In 2009, a subsidiary, flyLAL Charter Eesti, was registered with an aim to provide chartered operations to and from Estonia. In December 2009, another company, flyLAL Charters PL, was registered to implement flights from various airports in Poland (Warsaw, Katowice, Gdansk as bases).

In 2010, FlyLAL Charters was authorized to perform scheduled flights to Greece, Spain, Italy and various other countries. In July of the same year, flyLAL Charters was rebranded Small Planet Airlines. In 2009 and 2010, FlyLAL Charters carried 400,000 passengers; in 2012, the renamed Small Planet Airlines had increased the number to nearly 0.7 million passengers.

=== Later developments ===
In April 2013, Small Planet Airlines announced a buyout of the 99.5 percent of Small Planet Airlines UAB (Lithuania) and Small Planet Airlines Sp. z o. o."(Poland) shares held by Avia Solutions Group. After the transaction, Small Planet Airlines was owned by Vytautas Kaikaris and Andrius Staniulis, the management of the company. In 2014, holding company Small Planet Group was established to take ownership of the Small Planet Airlines of Lithuania and Poland. Small Planet Group UAB owns 100 percent of the shares of the leisure carrier Small Planet Airlines UAB and 90 percent of the shares of Small Planet Airlines Sp. z o. o. The holding controls 100% of UAB Small Planet Airlines, 100% Small Planet Airlines Sp. z o. o., 80% of Small Planet Airlines GmbH (Germany) and used to own 49% of Small Planet Airlines Thailand, which however never started operations.

In December 2014, Small Planet Airlines founded a company in Thailand, with the intention of securing a local air operator's certificate (AOC) and operating international flights from Thailand to China and South Korea. In 2015, Small Planet Airlines entered the German market with the incorporation of Small Planet Airlines GmbH; the company's office was established in Berlin. In September 2015, the company announced that during the next 5 winters, several aircraft (and flight deck crews) will be transferred to the Southeast Asia to operate from Siem Reap town in Cambodia to China, South Korea and Vietnam on behalf of Cambodian airline Sky Angkor Airlines. During the 2016, winter season, several planes and crews of Small Planet Airlines Poland were based in India and Saudi Arabia and operated on behalf of local airlines. In India, the planes and crew were operated on behalf of GoAir and in Saudi Arabia, the planes and crew operated on behalf of Nesma Airlines. At the end of March 2017, it was announced that Small Planet Airlines had obtained a permit to fly to and from Schiphol Airport in the Netherlands, mainly serving south European holiday destinations. The inaugural flight was welcomed at Schiphol Airport in December 2016. During winter 2017–18, Small Planet Airlines was back in India while operating on the behalf of IndiGo from its main base in Delhi.

On 24 October 2018, Small Planet Airlines announced it was entering a restructuring process due to financial difficulties shortly after its German and Polish subsidiaries did the same earlier in the month. Both the German and Polish companies ceased operations by November 2018, while the Cambodian subsidiary ceased operations shortly after.

On 28 November 2018, the Lithuanian aviation authority CAA revoked the operations license of Small Planet Airlines, resulting in grounding of all of its flights and fleets.

== Business trends ==
=== Passenger numbers ===
In June 2009, flyLAL Charters the company flew 33,600 passengers and that month it was the largest number in Vilnius Airport, even greater than that of regular airlines. By the end of the year flyLAL Charters had a total 85% of a charter market share. In 2012, from all the bases in Lithuania, France, Poland, United Kingdom Small Planet Airline flew over 700,000 people. In 2013, Small Planet Airlines became the first Lithuanian capital company to fly a million passengers. In 2014, due to increased locations the number increased and reached 1.212 million passengers.

=== Financial results ===
	2012	2013	2014	2015	2016	2017
Passengers	635,118	1,000,705	1,212,583	n/a	2,000,000	2,700,000
Aircraft	6	8	11	18	21	28
Income (EUR)	81,554,814	125,847,918	130,539,838	182,000,000	223,100,000	323,100,000
Profit (EUR)	-2,231,998	1,706,462	8,170,402	19,200,000	-3,800,000	5,100,000

== Destinations ==
The company flew mostly to Greece, Spain, Tunisia, Turkey, Egypt, and Bulgaria. In Lithuania, Small Planet Airlines cooperated with major travel organisers Tez Tour and Novaturas. The company also provided special flights, flying government delegations, sports teams, and other private groups. During the winter, some aircraft were transferred to other locations including India.

== Fleet ==
As of October 2018, before closure, Small Planet Airlines – excluding all subsidiaries – operated the following aircraft:

Aircraft	In service	Orders	Passengers	Notes
Airbus A320-200	7	—	180	
Total	7	—		

== Accident and incidents ==
- LLX5288 was a Small Planet Airlines A320 flight from Málaga, Spain, to Tampere, Finland, on 25 October 2016. At 12:34 GMT, Finnish police received a report of a possible hijacking on the aircraft. Hornets followed the aircraft from French airspace. As the plane entered Dutch Maastricht airspace at 12:34 GMT, the crew contacted air traffic control and reported a possible hijacking. Air traffic control informed the relevant authorities of the incident. The plane continued its flight as normal until it reached Finnish airspace, where it initiated a holding pattern. The plane landed safely in Tampere-Pirkkala airport at 15:02 GMT. According to eyewitnesses, police stormed the aircraft immediately after landing. Later investigations show that there was no hijacking. It is unknown whether it was a mechanical or pilot error. The investigation is ongoing.
