= List of international presidential trips made by Alar Karis =

This is a list of international presidential trips made by Alar Karis, the 6th President of Estonia.

== Summary ==
Number of visits per country where President Karis has traveled:

- One: Albania, Angola, Botswana, Canada, Cyprus, Denmark, Greece, Israel, India, Iraq, Jordan, Kazakhstan, Republic of Korea, Malta, Montenegro, Palestine, Spain, Slovenia and Turkey
- Two: Egypt, Netherlands, Norway, Moldova, Portugal, Slovakia, United Arab Emirates and Vatican City
- Three: Iceland and Sweden
- Four: Belgium, Germany, Italy and Romania
- Five: France, Switzerland, Ukraine and United Kingdom
- Seven: Finland and the United States
- Ten: Poland
- Eleven: Latvia and Lithuania

== 2021 ==
Country	Areas visited	Dates	Details	Image
Latvia	Riga	4 October	Alar Karis met with Speaker of the Latvian Parliament Ināra Mūrniece in Riga, visited the memorial stone of Kristjan Jaak Peterson and got acquainted with the future Estonian Embassy building. This was his first foreign visit.	
Finland	Helsinki	26 October	Alar Karis met with Finnish president Sauli Niinistö and visited the newly renovated Estonian Embassy building.	
Lithuania	Vilnius	27 October	Alar Karis met with Lithuanian president Gitanas Nausėda and visited the Estonian Embassy building.	
Poland	Warsaw	28–29 October	Alar Karis met with Polish president Andrzej Duda in Warsaw and visited the Estonian Embassy building.	
France	Paris	11–13 November	Alar Karis met with French president Emmanuel Macron, Vice President of the United States Kamala Harris, Canadian prime minister Justin Trudeau, Moldovan president Maia Sandu, Icelandic president Guðni Thorlacius Jóhannesson and European Commission president Ursula von der Leyen at the Paris Peace Forum. He also delivered a speech at the celebration of the 75th anniversary of UNESCO.	
Lithuania	Vilnius	15 November 2021	Alar Karis met with Lithuanian president Gitanas Nausėda and Latvian president Egils Levits in Vilnius. The hybrid attack on the European Union and Belarus border was discussed (Polish president Andrzej Duda participated via video link) and a joint statement was made.	
Belgium	Brussels	2–3 December	Alar Karis met with European Commission president Ursula von der Leyen in Brussels. The hybrid crisis and security in Europe, as well as cyber issues and climate issues, were discussed.	
United States	New York City	7–10 December	Alar Karis met with UN secretary-general António Guterres, with Abdulla Shahid, President of the General Assembly, and President of Niger Mohamed Bazoum.	

== 2022 ==
Country	Areas visited	Dates	Details	Image
Belgium	Brussels	12–13 January	Met with King Philippe I of Belgium and NATO secretary general Jens Stoltenberg.	
Sweden	Stockholm	20 January	Karis met with King Carl XVI Gustaf and Andreas Norlén, Speaker of the Swedish Riksdag, in Stockholm and visited the Estonian School in Stockholm.	
Norway	Oslo	4 February	Karis met with Crown Prince Haakon of Norway, Prime Minister Jonas Gahr Støre and Speaker of the Norwegian Parliament Masud Gharahkhan in Oslo, where he discussed the security situation in Europe and the region, the situation on the borders of Ukraine, security cooperation in both NATO and the UN, as well as issues related to regional cooperation and the Arctic Council. He opened the new building of the Estonian Embassy in Oslo.	
Ukraine	Kyiv	22 February	Karis met with Ukrainian president Volodymyr Zelenskyy and Ukrainian prime minister Denys Shmyhal and also participated in the joint statement on the Ukrainian crisis in the Donetsk and Luhansk regions.	
Poland	Warsaw	25 February	Attended Bucharest Nine summit. This format meeting of heads of state took place in connection with Russia's large-scale military attack on Ukraine.	
Moldova	Chișinău	17 March	Karis met with Moldovan president Maia Sandu and Moldovan prime minister Natalia Gavrilița in Chișinău. They talked about Moldova's European integration, discussed opportunities for closer bilateral cooperation within the Eastern Partnership and internationally. Alar Karis visited Moldova's largest reception center for Ukrainian war refugees, located a few kilometers from the center of Chișinău.	
Romania	Bucharest	17 March	Karis met with Romanian president Klaus Iohannis in Bucharest. They discussed cooperation between Estonia and Romania and the activities of the European Union and NATO aimed at ending the war in Europe.	
UAE	Dubai	18–20 March	Karis visited the Estonian Embassy in Abu Dhabi and participated in EXPO 2022 in Dubai, where he visited the Estonian and Ukrainian pavilions. He also visited the Louvre Museum in Abu Dhabi.	
Belgium	Brussels	24 March	Karis met with NATO secretary general Jens Stoltenberg, Polish president Andrzej Duda, Lithuanian president Gitanas Nausėda, and Latvian president Egils Levits at the European Council in Brussels. They discussed comprehensive support for Ukraine and strengthening European security against Russia.	
Poland	Rzeszów	12 April	Karis met with Polish president Andrzej Duda, Latvian president Egils Levits, and Lithuanian president Gitanas Nausėda in Rzeszów. They discussed Russia's large-scale military attack on Ukraine.	
Ukraine	Kyiv	13–14 April	Karis, together with Polish president Andrzej Duda, Latvian president Egils Levits, and Lithuanian president Gitanas Nausėda, met with Ukrainian president Volodymyr Zelenskyy in Kyiv to express support for the Ukrainian people, who are defending their country from Russian aggression, in a joint statement.	
Italy	Venice	20–21 April	Karis and his wife Sirje Karis attended the opening of the Estonian National Pavilion at the 59th Venice Art Biennale in Venice.	
Finland	Helsinki	11 May	Met with Finnish president Sauli Niinistö in Helsinki, with whom he exchanged views on regional security, Ukraine and NATO related issues. They also jointly opened a festive seminar dedicated to the 40th anniversary of the Tuglas Society.	
Switzerland	Geneva	23–26 May	Karis met with Latvian president Egils Levits, Polish president Andrzej Duda, Armenian president Vahagn Khachaturyan, Moldovan prime minister Natalia Gavrilița, Georgian prime minister Irakli Garibashvil, Montenegrin prime minister Dritan Abazović, and Austrian foreign minister Alexander Schallenberg at the World Economic Forum in Geneva, where they discussed the future of the European Union's Neighborhood Policy, given Russia's aggression in Ukraine.	
Romania	Bucharest	10 June	Attended the meeting of heads of state of Bucharest Nine format. They discussed the possibilities of strengthening NATO's deterrence and defense posture on the Eastern Front and the accession of Finland and Sweden to the alliance.	
Denmark	Copenhagen	14–15 June	Karis met in Copenhagen with Queen Margrethe II, Crown Prince Frederik X, and Speaker of the Danish Parliament Henrik Dam Kristensen, during which they discussed continued comprehensive support for Ukraine, the security of the Baltic Sea region, the upcoming NATO Madrid Summit, and the Estonian community in Denmark.	
Latvia	Riga	20 June	He participated in the Three Seas Initiative Summit, attended by European Commission Vice-president Valdis Dombrovskis, Latvian president Egils Levits, Lithuanian president Gitanas Nausėda, Polish president Andrzej Duda, Czech Parliament Speaker Miloš Vystrčil, Austrian president Alexander Van der Bellen, Slovak prime minister Eduard Heger, Hungarian president Katalin Novák, Slovenian president Borut Pahor, Croatian president Zoran Milanović, Romanian president Klaus Iohannis and Bulgarian president Rumen Radev. Invited guests included Scott A. Nathan, CEO of the United States International Development Finance Corporation, and Olena Kondratyuk, Deputy Speaker of the Verkhovna Rada of Ukraine. Alar Karis also met with German president Frank-Walter Steinmeier at a business forum. The aim of the discussion was to establish transport, energy and digital connections on the north–south axis of Eastern Europe, involving not only public but also private investments.	
Iceland	Reykjavík	26–27 August	Karis and his wife Sirje Karis, together with Estonian Foreign Minister Urmas Reinsalu, attended the official reception for the 31st anniversary of the restoration of the independence of the three Baltic states at the Höfði Maja at the invitation of Icelandic president Guðni Thorlacius Jóhannesson and his wife Eliza Reid, where Latvian president Egils Levits and his wife Andra, Latvian Foreign Minister Edgars Rinkēvičs, Lithuanian president Gitanas Nausėda and his wife Diana, and Lithuanian foreign minister Gabrielius Landsbergis were present. Alar Karis and his wife Sirje met with Speaker of the Icelandic Parliament Birgir Ármannsson at the Icelandic Parliament. Alar Karis, together with the presidents of the Baltic states, met with the prime minister of Iceland Katrín Jakobsdóttir on Viðey island. Alar Karis, together with the presidents of the Baltic states, visited the Hellisheiði power plant, Þingvellir national park with Estonians living in Iceland.	
United Kingdom	London	18–19 September	Karis and his wife Sirje traveled to London at the invitation of King Charles III to attend the funeral of Queen Elizabeth II.	
United States	New York City, Washington, D. C.	20–24 September	Karis flew on a private Polish government plane Boeing 737-800NG (reg. 0112) with President of Poland Andrzej Duda, NATO secretary general Jens Stoltenberg, and President of Moldova Maia Sandu and attended the 77th United Nations General Assembly in New York. Alar Karis met with President of Latvia Egils Levits and President of Lithuania Gitanas Nausėda UN Secretary-General Secretary-General António Guterres and also visited local Estonians at the Estonian House in New York. Alar Karis also attended a reception for President of the United States Joe Biden in Washington. His wife Sirje Karis participated in the program of spouses of heads of state who arrived for the UN high-level week, including receptions hosted by Ukrainian First Lady Olena Zelenska and Turkish First Lady Emine Erdoğan, and a reception for US president Joe Biden. On Thursday, September 22, Alar Karis will open Clevon's US headquarters in Dallas and on Friday, September 23, he will meet with Texas State Senator Ted Cruz, Congressman Lloyd Doggett, and Austin Mayor Steve Adler.	
Malta	Valletta	6–7 October	Alar Karis flew an extraordinary regular plane Ryanair Boeing 737-800MAX 8 (reg. 9H-VUK) with his wife Sirje, where they met and participated in Valletta with President of Malta George William Vella, President of Italy Sergio Mattarella, President of Slovakia Zuzana Čaputová, President of Latvia Egils Levits, President of Poland Andrzej Duda, President of Germany Frank-Walter Steinmeier, President of Ireland Michael D. Higgins, President of Hungary Katalin Novák, President of Slovenia Borut Pahor, Croatia president Zoran Milanović, President of Greece Aikateríni Sakellaropoúlou and President of Portugal Marcelo Nuno Duarte Rebelo de Sousa, where they discussed the European Union's global activities and neighborhood-related issues. Sirje Karis participated in the program of the spouses of the presidents who arrived for the Arraiolos Group meeting.	
Iceland	Reykjavík	13–14 October	Alar Karis met with Icelandic President Guðni Thorlacius Jóhannesson, former Icelandic president Ólafur Ragnar Grímsson, Governor General of Canada Mary Simon, Greenlandic Prime Minister Múte Bourup Egede and Crown Prince Haakon of Norway at the Arctic Assembly in Reykjavík. Alar Karis also participated in a lecture at the University of Iceland, where he introduced the development environment for Estonian start-ups and the possibilities of e-government.	
Egypt	Sharm el Sheikh	7–9 November	Karis met at the UN Climate Change Conference COP27 in Sharm el Sheikh at the invitation of Botswana President Mokgweetsi Masisi, Kenyan president William Ruto, Latvian president Egils Levits, Polish president Andrzej Duda, Romanian president Klaus Iohannis, Slovak president Zuzana Čaputová, Czech prime minister Petr Fiala, Slovenian president Borut Pahor, Bulgarian president Rumen Radev, Finnish prime minister Sanna Marin and Pakistani prime minister Shehbaz Sharif, where he addressed the heads of state of the conference will deliver a so-called state of the art address at the opening event and discuss Africa's response to climate change, as well as concerns about water availability and climate education.	
Canada	Halifax, Ottawa, Toronto	18–23 November	Karis participated in a high-level international security forum in Halifax and met with Ukrainian Deputy Prime Minister Olha Stefanishyna. Alar Karis also opened the Estonian Embassy in Ottawa, one of whose grand development projects is currently the establishment of the Estonian Center in downtown Toronto, and met with Canadian prime minister Justin Trudeau in Toronto. Alar Karis met with former First Lady of the United States and former Secretary of State Hillary Clinton in the library, who autographed a book.	
Latvia	Riga	19 December	Karis met with the president of Latvia Egils Levits and President of Lithuania Gitanas Nausėda, during which they discussed Russian aggression in Ukraine, regional security, and strengthening collective defense in NATO.	

== 2023 ==
Country	Areas visited	Dates	Details	Image
Poland	Warsaw	22 February	Karis met in Warsaw with US president Joe Biden, President of Poland Andrzej Duda, President of Slovakia Zuzana Čaputová, President of Hungary Katalin Novák, President of Romania Klaus Iohannis, President of Bulgaria Rumen Radev, Prime Minister of the Czech Republic Petr Fiala, and NATO secretary general Jens Stoltenberg, where the Bucharest Nine format of the meeting of heads of state was held.	
Slovakia	Košice	28–29 March	Karis met with Slovak president Zuzana Čaputová and Slovak prime minister Eduard Heger in Košice to celebrate the 30th anniversary of the establishment of diplomatic relations between Estonia and Slovakia. Alar Karis, together with Slovak president Zuzana Čaputová, attended the opening of the Civitta creative city at Spiš Castle.	
Sweden	Malmö, Lund	4–5 April	Karis participated with entrepreneurs and university rectors, whenever possible, to strengthen scientific and economic cooperation. Alar opened the Estonian Honorary Consulate in Malmö and participated in the Lund Estonian House in Lund.	
Netherlands	The Hague	13–15 April	Karis met with King Willem-Alexander of the Netherlands, Prime Minister Mark Rutte, President of the Senate Jan Anthonie Bruijn and Deputy Speaker of the House of Representatives Roelien Kamming in The Hague, where they discussed with the heads of state the strengthening of defense and energy cooperation and comprehensive support for Ukraine. Alar Karis attended the Erasmus University Rotterdam, where he has worked as a researcher. Karis opened a corner dedicated to the Estonian literature collection in the All Languages Building of the Public Library in Amsterdam and lastly met with honorary consuls and Estonian entrepreneurs operating in the Netherlands and their partners. Initially, the first state visit was due to the formation of the government by Kaja Kallas, but the appointment of ministers will be postponed to next week due to Karis' visit.	
Latvia	Riga	24–26 April	Karis and his wife Sirje flew on a specially ordered Latvian aircraft in the Estonian flag colors airBaltic Airbus A220-300 aircraft with registration number YL-CSJ and flight number BT1312. Alar Karis and his wife Sirje met with President Egils Levits and his wife Andra Levite, Latvian prime minister Arturs Krišjānis Kariņš, Speaker of the Latvian Parliament Edvards Smiltēns, and Mayor of Riga Mārtiņš Staķis, it was the first state visit of President Karis' term. Regarding the strengthening of good-neighborly relations between Estonia and Latvia, especially in the digital sphere and defense cooperation, during which preparations for the upcoming NATO summit and continuing comprehensive support for Ukraine were discussed. Alar Karis delivered a speech in Estonian before the parliament. During the visit, a visit to the construction of the Rail Baltica Riga railway terminal and the Inčukalns underground gas storage facility was held. Alar Karis and his wife Sirje Karis laid wreaths at the foot of the Latvian Freedom Monument, visited the Latvian Occupation Museum and met with members of the Fraternitas Lataviensis corporation. Sirje Karis, the wife of the Estonian president, and Andra Levite, the wife of the Latvian president, visited the center where humanitarian aid is collected and packaged for sending to Ukraine, the Riga TechGirls technology training center for girls, and the SOS Children's Village in Valmiera. Sirje Karis also got acquainted with the teaching at the Riga Estonian School. On the way back to Estonia, President Karis stopped at the Rubene Evangelical Lutheran Church and met with Mayor of Valmiera Jānis Baiks. Alar Karis laid flowers at the memorial plaque of Viktor Anderson, a Viljandi schoolboy who fell in the War of Independence, in Valmiera and visited the Vidzeme college, the Valmieramuiža brewery, and the Rūjiena ice cream factory.	
United Kingdom	London	5–7 May	Karis traveled to London to attend the coronation of King Charles III coronation ceremony at Westminster Abbey. Alar Karis participated in the NATO Innovation Accelerator DIANA, where the goal was to have bilateral meetings with colleagues. They visited the Estonian House, where they met with the Estonian community. On the last day, Alar Karis met with the president of Botswana, Mokgweetsi Masisi, and the prime minister of Namibia, Saara Kuugongelwa-Amadhila, on the topic of e-governance, e-education, and the development of bilateral economic relations. Finally, Alar Karis and Sirje Karis participated in the Street Parties as part of the coronation celebrations.	
Iceland	Reykjavík	16–18 May	Karis attended the fourth Council of Europe summit and met with Icelandic president Guðni Thorlacius Jóhannesson and Icelandic prime minister Katrín Jakobsdóttir, with the aim of supporting Ukraine and holding Russia accountable for war crimes. Along with Alar Karis, the roundtable discussion was attended by Slovenian president Nataša Pirc Musar, Finnish president Sauli Niinistö, Ukrainian prime minister Denys Shmygal, Irish prime minister Leo Varadkar, Dutch prime minister Mark Rutte, Croatian prime minister Andrej Plenković, Swedish foreign minister Tobias Billström, European Commission president Ursula von der Leyen, OSCE Secretary General Helga Schmidt, and United States Ambassador to the United Nations Linda Thomas-Greenfield.	
Ukraine	Kyiv	1–2 June	Karis met with Ukrainian president Volodymyr Zelenskyy, where they discussed bilateral economic cooperation and the reconstruction of Ukraine, as well as bringing to justice those involved in the crime of aggression. He was accompanied by Minister of Economic Affairs and Information Technology Tiit Riisalo, Minister of Foreign Affairs Margus Tsahkna and a 24-member business delegation. Alar Karis visited the Anti-Corruption Bureau of Ukraine in Kyiv.	
Slovakia	Bratislava	6–7 June	Attended Bucharest Nine format of the Heads of State meeting to discuss the goals of the Vilnius summit, take stock of the regional security situation, and discuss the need for continued support for Ukraine.	
Albania	Tirana, Krujë	8–9 June	Karis met with Albanian president Bajram Begaje, Speaker of the Albanian Parliament Lindita Nikolla and Albanian prime minister Edi Rama. Alar Karis visited the historic fortress city of Krujë, the home of Albanian national hero Skanderbeg. This was the first visit of an Estonian head of state to Albania.	
United Kingdom	London	20–22 June	Met with King Charles III at Windsor Castle in London on the morning of June 20. Alar Karis delivered the opening speech at the Estonian and British business seminar and the international venture capital and innovation conference Global Corporate Venturing Symposium. On June 21, Alar Karis delivered a speech at the conference on supporting and rebuilding Ukraine and involving the private sector and investments in it, as part of the Ukraine Recovery Conference, and spoke at an event introducing the activities of Estonian educational technology companies, which was attended by British school associations, educational companies and education investors, and was attended by British prime minister Rishi Sunak, British Foreign Secretary James Cleverly, Ukrainian prime minister Denys Shmygal, European Commission president Ursula von der Leyen, US Secretary of State Antony Blinken and Latvian prime minister Arturs Krišjānis Kariņš.	
Romania	Bucharest	5–6 September	Karis participated in the Three Seas Initiative Summit in Bucharest, attended by Romanian president Klaus Iohannis, Latvian president Edgars Rinkēvičs, Lithuanian president Gitanas Nausėda, Polish president Andrzej Duda, Czech president Petr Pavel, Austrian president Alexander Van der Bellen, Hungarian president Katalin Novák, Slovenian president Nataša Pirc Musar, Bulgarian president Rumen Radev, Slovak president Zuzana Čaputová, Romanian prime minister Marcel Ciolacu and Croatian prime minister Andrej Plenković. Invited guests were Moldovan president Maia Sandu, Greek president Aikateríni Sakellaropoúlou, Ukrainian Deputy Prime Minister Yulia Svyrydenko and US Special Envoy for Climate Change John Kerry. He participated in the business forum. The purpose of the discussion was to create opportunities for better cooperation in the Baltic, Black and Adriatic Seas and ensure crisis resilience, primarily through more efficient interconnections.	
United States	New York City	18–22 September	Karis met with Secretary-General António Guterres, President of Latvia Edgars Rinkēvičs, President of Lithuania Gitanas Nausėda and President of Poland Andrzej Duda at the 78th UN General Assembly in New York, where they discussed cooperation in international organizations and support for Ukraine. Alar Karis also met with President of Kazakhstan Kassym-Jomart Tokayev, President of Angola João Lourenço and Prime Minister of Tonga Siaosi Sovalen at the UN General Assembly, where they discussed security issues of common concern. Alar Karis also met with Crown Prince (Regent) Alois of Liechtenstein at the UN General Assembly, where they discussed cooperation in international organizations and cybersecurity. Alar Karis also met with President of Moldova Maia Sandu at the UN General Assembly, where they discussed the latest developments in the region. Alar Karis spoke at the UN Security Council, where the purpose was the debate on peace and security in Ukraine. He also met with Guatemalan president Alejandro Giammattei at the UN General Assembly, with the aim of getting the UN Security Council reform back on track. Alar Karis also met with Georgian prime minister Irakli Garibashvili at the UN General Assembly, with the aim of continuing Georgia's path of reform towards the European Union. Alar Karis also met with Andorran prime minister Xavier Espot Zamora at the UN General Assembly, with the aim of discussing the need to reform the UN Security Council, cooperation in other international organizations, and Andorra's progress in negotiations with the European Union for an association agreement. Alar Karis also met with Ukrainian First Lady Olena Zelenska at the UN General Assembly, with the aim of directing the international community and the UN to do everything possible to stand up for Ukrainian children suffering from Russian war atrocities. Alar Karis also met with Belarusian democratic opposition leader Sviatlana Tsikhanouskaya at the UN General Assembly, with the aim of discussing current issues. Alar Karis invited UN members to the Estonian House, with the aim of officially adding World Cleanup Day to the UN calendar. Alar Karis attended a meeting in Washington with US president Joe Biden and his wife Jill Biden, attended by Slovak president Zuzana Čaputová and Czech president Petr Pavel, at the invitation of a reception celebrating the 30th anniversary of the founding of both countries and their membership in the UN.	
Portugal	Porto	5–7 October	Karis and his wife Sirje met and participated in Porto with the president of Portugal Marcelo Nuno Duarte Rebelo de Sousa, the president of Italy Sergio Mattarella, the president of Latvia Edgars Rinkēvičs, the president of Poland Andrzej Duda, the president of Ireland Michael D. Higgins, the president of Hungary Katalin Novák, the president of Slovenia Nataša Pirc Musar, the president of Croatia Zoran Milanović, the president of Greece Aikateríni Sakellaropoúlou, the president of Finland Sauli Niinistö, the president of Bulgaria Rumen Radev and the president of Malta George William Vella, where they discussed the situation in Ukraine and the European Union's support and the future and enlargement of the EU. Sirje Karis participated in the program of the spouses of the presidents who arrived for the Arraiolos Group meeting.	
South Korea	Seoul	11–14 October	Karis, together with Estonian entrepreneurs, met with South Korean president Yoon Suk Yeol in Seoul and visited the Estonian Embassy and the Business Center. Alar Karis also visited the South Korean Artillery Brigade and the oldest university - Sungkyunkwan University, and met with leaders of top South Korean companies.	
Switzerland	Geneva	12–13 December	Karis participated in the celebration of the 75th anniversary of the UN Declaration of Human Rights in Geneva, where he met with UN High Commissioner for Human Rights Volker Türk, High Commissioner for Refugees Filippo Grandi, and President of the International Committee of the Red Cross Mirjana Spoljaric Egger.	

== 2024 ==
Country	Areas visited	Dates	Details	Image
Iraq	Baghdad	16–17 January	Karis met with Iraqi president Abdul Latif Rashid and Deputy Speaker of the Iraqi Parliament Mohsen Al-Mandalawi in Baghdad, where the goal was to promote peace and prosperity in various international missions. Alar Karis visited the Iraqi Museum. Alar Karis visited the Erbil Air Base, where the largest Estonian unit currently serving in a foreign mission is located. Alar Karis met with the president of the Kurdistan Region, Nechirvan Barzani. This was the first Estonian head of state to visit Baghdad.	
Finland	Helsinki	13–15 February	Karis met with Finnish president Sauli Niinistö and Finnish foreign minister Elina Valtonen, where they discussed Estonian and Finnish cooperation in NATO, educational and cultural cooperation, and various projects in the energy sector. Alar Karis will deliver a presentation at the University of Jyväskylä in memory of President Martti Ahtisaari and the legacy of peacemaking. Alar Karis participated in a reception dedicated to the 106th anniversary of the Republic of Estonia at the Estonian Embassy in Helsinki, which was attended by the diplomatic corps, friends of Estonia, and the Estonian community in Finland.	
Botswana	Gaborone	4–7 March	Karis and his wife Sirje Karis met in Gaborone with Botswana president Mokgweetsi Masisi and his wife Neo Maswab, Botswana National Assembly Speaker Phandu Skelemani, and Gaborone Mayor Austin Abraham, where they mapped Estonia's interests in Africa with entrepreneurs and the Foreign Service and analyzed which countries would have the greatest potential for cooperation. This was the second state visit of President Karis' term and involved Estonian entrepreneurs. Sirje Karis visited the Children's Addiction Disorders Center and the National Youth Center, where youth entrepreneurship activities are introduced. Botswana is the first state visit to Africa that he has visited as a head of state.	
Angola	Luanda	7–9 March	Karis and his wife Sirje Karis met with Angolan president João Lourenço and the president of the Angolan National Assembly Carolina Cerqueira in Luanda, with the aim of exploring potential, particularly in digital cooperation, e-governance, cybersecurity, e-health, e-education and green technologies. The business delegation visiting Angola included representatives of Digital Nation, E-Government Academy and Admirals Group.	
Cyprus	Nicosia	26–28 March	Karis and his wife Sirje met in Nicosia with the president Níkos Christodoulídis, together with his wife Philippa Karsera Christodoulídis, and the speaker of the Cyprus Parliament, Annita Demetriou, to strengthen political and economic relations between Estonia and Cyprus and discuss the security picture in Europe and the wider Mediterranean region. Alar Karis opened the Estonia-Cyprus Business Forum and spoke about strengthening economic cooperation at a reception at the Cyprus Chamber of Commerce and Industry. Alar Karis visited the University of Cyprus, where he attended a lecture on Estonia's digital society and economy and foreign policy and security challenges in the Baltic and Mediterranean regions. Alar Karis visited the institute, which was a non-profit research and educational institution with a scientific and technological focus. Alar Karis introduced the laboratories there that dealt with drones and artistic heritage. Sirje Karis met with the first lady of Cyprus, Philippa Karsera Christodoulídis, with whom they visited the Christos Stelios Foundation Rehabilitation Center, the Neonatal Department of Bishop Makarios III Hospital, and the Cyprus Archaeological Museum.	
Lithuania	Vilnius	11 April	Karis participated in the Three Seas Initiative Summit, where he met with Presidents of Lithuania, Latvia, Poland, Czech Republic, Hungary, Romania, and Bulgaria, Greek prime minister Kyriakos Mitsotakis, Slovak prime minister Robert Fico, Croatian foreign minister Gordan Grlić-Radman, Austrian Federal Minister for Integration Susanne Raab, and Ukrainian president Volodymyr Zelenskyy, where the discussion focused on the initiative's main goal of accelerating the construction of north–south connections and improving Ukraine's infrastructure and better connecting it with Europe.	
Germany	Berlin	16–18 April	Karis met with President Frank-Walter Steinmeier, where the topic was support for Ukraine, European security and relations between the two countries, with a focus on economic, defense, cultural and digital cooperation. Alar Karis participated in the Estonian Embassy in Berlin, where the diplomatic corps, Estonian friends and the Estonian community in Germany participated. Alar Karis participated together with President Steinmeier in a digital roundtable organized by the German e-Government Innovation and Development Center. The main topic of the roundtable was the use of digital technology solutions for the benefit of democracy. Alar Karis participated in the opening panel of a forum organized by the Berghof Foundation, where international efforts needed to resolve conflicts and maintain peace are discussed. Alar Karis also participated in a concert by Curly Strings, which was part of the ensemble's tour of Germany.	
Latvia	Riga	11 June	Karis met with Latvian president Edgars Rinkēvičs, Lithuanian president Gitanas Nausėda, Polish president Andrzej Duda, Swedish prime minister Ulf Kristersson, Finnish president Alexander Stubb, Czech president Petr Pavel, Slovak Deputy Prime Minister and Minister of Defence Robert Kaliňák, Romanian president Klaus Iohannis, Bulgarian president Rumen Radev, NATO secretary general Jens Stoltenberg and Hungarian Ambassador György Urkut in Riga, a meeting of heads of state in the Bucharest Nine format to discuss common goals for the summit, regarding continued support for Ukraine and the security threat emanating from Russia to the whole of Europe. The B9 summit in Riga takes place in NATO's jubilee year, marking the 75th anniversary of NATO's founding.	
Latvia	Cēsis	22 June	Karis met with President Edgars Rinkēvičs, where they participated in the celebrations of the 105th anniversary of the victorious Battle of Võnnu.	
Turkey	Ankara	27–28 June	Karis met with Turkish president Recep Tayyip Erdoğan and Turkish Parliament Speaker Numan Kurtulmuş to celebrate the 100th anniversary of diplomatic relations between Estonia and Turkey, talk about strengthening bilateral relations, strengthening defense cooperation, discuss the transatlantic security space and regional security concerns, and expectations from the NATO summit in Washington.	
Lithuania	Vilnius	6 July	Karis and his wife Sirje met with President Gitanas Nausėda and his wife Diana Nausėdienė at noon at the national flag-raising ceremony in Daukanta Square, where he delivered a speech. Alar Karis and Sirje Karis attended the celebration of the 100th anniversary of the Lithuanian Song Festival in Vingios Park in the evening. Sirje Karis and Diana Nausėdienė visited Vilnius University.	
France	Paris	25–28 July	Karis and his wife Sirje Karis met with French president Emmanuel Macron, his wife Brigitte Macron, and International Olympic Committee president Thomas Bach, and attended the opening ceremony of the Paris Olympic Games at Trocadéro Square. Alar and Sirje Karis visited the Olympic Village, where they met with the Estonian Olympic team and their supporters, and followed the Estonian athletes' competitions.	
Latvia	Unguriņi	23 August	Karis met with Latvian president Edgars Rinkēvičs at the Latvian-Estonian Unguriņi - Lilli border crossing, where the unveiling of the sculpture "Baltic Chain" took place on the occasion of the 35th anniversary of the Baltic Chain.	
Moldova	Chișinău	27 August	Karis flew a Diamond Sky airliner Hawker Beechcraft 400A (reg. ES-CMK) to Chișinău International Airport at the invitation of Moldova President Maia Sandu. During lunch, Alar Karis, together with Latvian president Edgars Rinkēvičs and Lithuanian president Gitanas Nausėda, met with Moldovan prime minister Dorin Recean in Chișinău, where they participated in the celebration of the Independence Day of the Republic of Moldova. Alar Karis, together with Dorin Recean, Gitanas Nauseda and Edgars Rinkēvičs, participated in the flower-laying ceremony at the monument to Stephen III the Great (Ștefan cel Mare și Sfânt) in Chișinău on Grand National Assembly Square. In the afternoon, Karis, along with Dorin Recean, Gitanas Nauseda and Edgars Rinkēvičs, participated in an Independence Day concert, where they expressed support for Moldova in its preparations for joining the European Union. Alar Karis flew to Tallinn on the same plane in the evening.	
Ukraine	Kyiv	12–14 September	Karis met with the president of Ukraine Volodymyr Zelenskyy, the chairman of the Verkhovna Rada of Ukraine Ruslan Stefanchuk, and the Minister of Foreign Affairs of Ukraine Andriy Sybiha, during which they discussed unwavering support for Ukraine and its goals. The president of Ukraine Volodymyr Zelenskyy presented the Order of Prince Yaroslav the Wise, 1st Class, to Alar Karis, which he received on Ukraine's Independence Day for his significant personal contribution to strengthening international cooperation, supporting the sovereignty and territorial integrity of Ukraine, and popularizing the Ukrainian state in the world. Alar Karis visited the annual meeting of the “Yalta European Strategy XX” and met with former president of Ukraine Leonid Kuchma, where Volodymyr Zelenskyy spoke. Alar Karis participated in the “Young Leaders Forum” platform, which spoke about the right to live safely and in freedom. Alar Karis visited a thermal power plant in the Kyiv region, which was hit by Russian cruise missiles and completely destroyed as a result. Sirje Karis, along with Rossana Briseño from Belize, Lucresia Peynado from Guatemala, Cuzanne Innes-Stubb from Finland, Diana Nausėdiene from Lithuania, Tamara Vučić from Serbia, Bo Tengberg from Denmark, and Alesh Musara from Slovenia, participated at the invitation of Olena Zelenska, the wife of the president of Ukraine, at the fourth "First Ladies and Gentlemen Summit" platform.	
United States	New York City	22–26 September	Karis and his wife Sirje met with Secretary-General António Guterres, Latvian president Edgars Rinkēvičs, Lithuanian president Gitanas Nausėda and Polish president Andrzej Duda at the 79th UN General Assembly in New York, where the discussion focused on the obvious need to reform the UN, its Security Council and strengthen support for Ukraine. Alar Karis spoke with President Philémon Yang and the UN High Representative for the Least Developed Countries, Landlocked Developing Countries and Small Island Developing States Rabab Fatima at the UN General Assembly, where he also attended a reception by US president Joe Biden. Alar Karis also met with Sheikh Mishal Al-Ahmad Al-Jaber Al-Sabah of Kuwait, President Tharman Shanmugaratnam of Singapore, President Julius Maada Bio of Sierra Leone and President Irfaan Ali of Guyana at the UN General Assembly, the discussions aimed at providing solutions to preserve and strengthen a rules-based world order. Alar Karis also met with the prime minister of East Timor, Xanana Gusmão, to discuss digital cooperation and Estonia's e-governance experience. Alar Karis also met with the chairman of the Presidency of Bosnia and Herzegovina (Bosnian member), Denis Bećirović, to discuss the need for reforms and the path towards the European Union and NATO. The next day, Alar Karis also met with the Federal Chancellor of the Federal Republic of Germany, Olaf Scholz, to discuss the Future of the United Nations. Alar Karis also met with the prime minister of Liechtenstein, Daniel Risch, to discuss cooperation in the United Nations. Alar Karis spoke with the president of Suriname, Chan Santokh. Alar Karis met with the foreign minister of Luxembourg, Xavier Bettel. Alar Karis also met with the president of Ukraine, Volodymyr Zelenskyy, at the UN General Assembly and also participated in a meeting organized by Ukraine with the G7 and other countries that have signed security agreements with Ukraine, where issues related to continued support and reconstruction activities for Ukraine will be discussed. Alar Karis and Sirje met with representatives of American companies and local Estonians at the Estonian House, with the aim of jointly commemorating the anniversary of the Great Escape. Alar Karis opened Estonia's new honorary consulate in New York. Sirje Karis participated in the UN High-Level Program for Spouses of Heads of State. Estonia, together with Ukraine, organized a high-level side event focusing on the situation of children, the discussion of which was chaired by Sirje Karis and the spouse of the president of Ukraine, Olena Zelenska. Sirje Karis also participated in a luncheon meeting with the first lady of the United States of America Jill Biden and a reception for the spouse of the president of Turkey, Emine Erdoğan. In New York, Sirje Karis introduced the activities of the mental health center Fountain House. Estonian foreign minister Margus Tsahkna also participated in the UN High-Level Program in New York, where the Estonian delegation was led by President Alar Karis.	
Poland	Kraków	10–12 October	Karis with his wife Sirje, where they met and participated in the Arraiolos Group in Kraków with Polish president Andrzej Duda, Austrian president Alexander Van der Bellen, Bulgarian president Rumen Radev, Croatian president Zoran Milanović, Irish president Michael Daniel Higgins, Italian president Sergio Mattarella, Greek president Aikateríni Sakellaropoúlou, Latvian president Edgars Rinkēvičs, Maltese president Myriam Spiteri Debono, Portuguese president Marcelo Nuno Duarte Rebelo de Sousa, German president Frank-Walter Steinmeier, Slovak president Peter Pellegrini, Slovenian president Nataša Pirc Musar, Finnish president Alexander Stubb and Hungarian president Tamás Sulyok, which focused on strengthening transatlantic cooperation, supporting Ukraine and ensuring European security, and strengthening relations with the United States. Sirje Karis participated in the program for the spouses of the presidents who arrived for the Arraiolos Group meeting.	
Switzerland	Geneva	17 October	Karis participated in the flag-raising ceremony in Geneva on the occasion of becoming a full member of the European Organization for Nuclear Research, when Estonia became the 24th full member of the organization. Alar Karis met with Fabiola Gianotti, Director General of the European Organization for Nuclear Research, who gave an overview of the activities of the European Organization for Nuclear Research. Alar Karis visited the Center of Excellence for Biotechnology and Life Sciences Research. Alar Karis met with Ngozi Okonjo-Iweala, Director-general of the World Trade Organization, to discuss rules-based trade, support for Ukraine, and the promotion of sustainable development goals within the framework of the World Trade Organization. This year, Estonia celebrated 25 years since joining the World Trade Organization.	
Jordan	Amman, Jerash	3–6 November	Karis flew a Challenger 604 (reg. OH-WIC) of the airline Jetflite to Amman Airport late on November 3. Alar Karis met on the morning of November 4 with King of Jordan ‘Abd Allāh II, Crown Prince Ḩusayn, and Prime Minister Jafar Hassan, to discuss European and Middle East security concerns, to reconcile opinions on Russian war against Ukraine, and to gain an overview of the views of the countries of the region on the options for resolving the Middle East conflict. On November 4, Alar Karis visited the World Food Program's assistance center in Amman, from where humanitarian aid is sent to conflict zones in the Middle East, including Gaza and currently Lebanon. On November 5, Alar Karis spoke at the opening of a business forum in Amman, where entrepreneurs were invited to strengthen cooperation. Alar Karis, together with Jordanian Minister of Environment Muawieh Radaideh, visited the ruins of the Temple of Zeus in Jerash.	
Egypt	Cairo	6–8 November	Karis flew to Cairo Airport on the late morning of November 6 on an Egyptair Boeing B737-866 (reg. SU-GEN). Alar Karis met with President Abdel Fattah el-Sisi and Egyptian prime minister Mostafa Madbouly in Cairo, where they discussed cooperation to ease security tensions. Alar Karis met with Pope Tawadros II of Alexandria and Patriarch of the See of St. Mark and His Eminence Ahmed El-Tayeb at the Amr ibn al-Asi Mosque. Alar Karis attended the reception of Estonian Honorary Consul Motaz Raslan.	
Lithuania	Klaipėda	6 December	Karis met with Lithuanian president Gitanas Nausėda, Polish president Andrzej Duda and Latvian president Edgars Rinkēvičs in Klaipėda, where he participated in the annual meeting of the presidents of the Baltic states. Alar Karis, together with Gitanas Nausėda, Andrzej Duda and Edgars Rinkēvičs, participated in the celebration of the 10th anniversary of the Independence LNG terminal.	
France	Paris	7–8 December	Karis and his wife Sirje Karis met with President Emmanuel Macron in Paris, where they attended the reopening of the restored Notre-Dame Cathedral at the invitation of Emmanuel Macron.	

== 2025 ==
Country	Areas visited	Dates	Details	Image
Poland	Oświęcim	27 January	Alar Karis flew to Katowice Airport at noon on a Diamond Sky business jet, a Nextant 400XTi (reg. ES-CMK and flight number DMS711). Alar Karis met with Polish president Andrzej Duda and his wife Agata Kornhauser-Duda at the Auschwitz concentration camp near Oświęcim, King Philippe I of Belgium and Queen Mathilde, King Felipe VI of Spain with Queen Letizia, King Willem-Alexander of the Netherlands with Queen Máxima and Crown Princess Catharina-Amalia, King Frederik X of Denmark with Queen Mary, King Charles III of Great Britain, Crown Prince Haakon of Norway, Crown Princess Victoria of Sweden, Regent Guillaume of Luxembourg, President Alexander Van der Bellen of Austria, President Rumen Radev of Bulgaria, President Sergio Mattarella of Italy, President Edgars Rinkēvičs of Latvia, President Myriam Spiteri Debono of Malta, President Maia Sandu of Moldova, President Jakov Milatović of Montenegro, President Emmanuel Macron of France, President Gordana Siljanovska-Davkova of North Macedonia, President Frank-Walter Steinmeier of Germany, President Peter Pellegrini of Slovakia, Slovenian president Nataša Pirc Musar, Finnish president Alexander Stubb, Swiss Federal president Karin Keller-Sutter, Czech president Petr Pavel, Ukrainian president Volodymyr Zelenskyy, Hungarian president Tamás Sulyok, Belgian prime minister Alexander de Croo, Dutch prime minister Dick Schoof, Croatian prime minister Andrej Plenković, Irish prime minister Micheál Martin, Acting prime minister of Canada Justin Trudeau, Luxembourg prime minister Luc Frieden, Polish prime minister Donald Tusk, Swedish prime minister Ulf Kristersson, Minister of State of Monaco Isabelle Berro-Amadeï, Liechtenstein Minister of Foreign Affairs, Minister of Education and Sports Dominique Hasler, Romanian Minister of Family, Youth and Equal Opportunities Natalia-Elena Intotero, Icelandic Minister of Foreign Affairs Þorgerður Katrín Gunnarsdóttir, Greek Deputy Foreign Minister Anastasios Chatzivasileiou, Serbian foreign minister Marko Đurić, Cypriot Minister of Defence Vasilios Palmas, Israeli Minister of Education Yoav Kisch, Portuguese Presidency Minister António Leitão Amaro, Federal Chancellor of the Federal Republic of Germany Olaf Scholz, United States Special Envoy for the Middle East Steve Witkoff, Speaker of the Swedish Riksdag Andreas Norlén, Bjørn Berge, Deputy Secretary-General of the Council of Europe, Valdis Dombrovskis, Commissioner for Economy and Productivity, Implementation and Simplification, President of the European Council, António Costa, President of the European Parliament, Roberta Metsola, Deputy Secretary-General of NATO, Radmila Šekerinska, Director-general of UNESCO, Audrey Azoulay, Under-Secretary-General of the United Nations for Political and Peacekeeping Affairs, Rosemary DiCarlo, President of Kosovo, Vjosa Osmani, and Željka Cvijanović, Chair of the Presidency of Bosnia and Herzegovina every. It took place at an event dedicated to the 80th anniversary of the liberation of the Auschwitz-Birkenau concentration camp. In the evening, Alar Karis flew back to Tallinn Airport on a Diamond Sky business jet, a Nextant 400XTi (reg. ES-CMK and flight number DMS711).	
Lithuania	Vilnius	9 February	Karis met with Lithuanian president Gitanas Nausėda, Polish president Andrzej Duda, Latvian president Edgars Rinkēvičs and European Commission president Ursula von der Leyen, where he participated together with Estonian Climate Minister Yoko Alender in a ceremony celebrating the integration of the Baltic States into the European energy system. In the afternoon, Alar Karis visited the MO Museum in Vilnius, where he viewed the collection of contemporary art. The evening before, on his way from Vilnius to Paris, Alar Karis met by chance with the leader of the Belarusian democratic opposition, Sviatlana Tsikhanouskaya, at the Vilnius Airport, where he expressed his support and inquired about the situation in Belarus.	
France	Paris	10–11 February	Karis attended an artificial intelligence summit at the invitation of French president Emmanuel Macron. At the same time, he had a chance meeting with Latvian president Edgars Rinkēvičs. On next day, he met with Indian prime minister Narendra Modi, where they discussed opportunities for cooperation between Estonia and India in the digital field.	
Israel	Jerusalem	12 February	Karis met with President Isaac Herzog in Jerusalem this morning, where they discussed the security situation in the region. Alar Karis visited Mount Herzl in Jerusalem at noon and the Yad Vashem Holocaust Museum and Memorial, where the founders and prominent leaders of the State of Israel are buried. Alar Karis met with Knesset Speaker Amir Ohana in the afternoon, where the security situation was discussed. And Alar Karis visited the Church of the Holy Sepulchre in Jerusalem.	
Palestine	Ramallah	13 February	Karis met with Palestinian prime minister Mohammad Mustafa this morning. They discussed the reconstruction of Gaza and how to reform the education system and strengthen the provision of public services.	
Germany	Munich	14–15 February	On the morning, Alar Karis attended the 61st Munich Security Conference. He met with Latvian president Edgars Rinkēvičs, Finnish president Alexander Stubb, Bulgarian president Rumen Radev, Moldovan president Maia Sandu, Latvian prime minister Evika Siliņa, Finnish prime minister Petteri Orpo, Swedish prime minister Ulf Kristersson, Prime Minister Jonas Gahr Støre, Danish prime minister Mette Frederiksen, Icelandic prime minister Kristrún Frostadóttir and Kosovo President Vjosa Osmani, where the discussion focused on the future of European security and emphasized the influence of small states in a multipolar world, and expressed full and firm support for Ukraine. In the afternoon at 16:30, Alar Karis, together with Fijian prime minister Sitiveni Rabuka, Slovenian Minister for Foreign and European Affairs Tanja Fajon and Liechtenstein Foreign Minister, Minister of Education and Sport Dominique Hasler, discussed the topic “Small State Power in the Spotlight”. Alar Karis met with Nechirvan Barzani, the president of the Kurdistan Region of Iraq, where the discussion focused on protecting security and international politics. On the morning of February 15, Alar Karis attended a hearing with Ukrainian president Volodymyr Zelenskyy, where he spoke about ending the war and providing military assistance to Ukraine. At the same time, he met with the Federal Chancellor Olaf Scholz. At lunch, Alar Karis, together with Danish prime minister Mette Frederiksen, Croatian prime minister Andrej Plenković, former US Special Representative for Ukraine and Russia General Keith Kellogg, and Ukrainian Deputy Prime Minister for European and Euro-Atlantic Integration Olha Stefanishyna, participated in a discussion on Ukraine. At lunch, Alar Karis met with former Georgian president Salome Zurabishvili, where they discussed Russia's hybrid intervention in Georgia - emphasizing the urgent need for new, free and fair elections.	
Finland	Raseborg	26–27 February	Karis introduced the armored vehicle factory in Raseborg to the work of the military and truck manufacturer Sisu Auto and the Olkiluoto Nuclear Power Plant. He coincidentally discovered the Finnish local Swedish name Karis, a densely populated area that includes part of the city of Raseborg. Alar Karis met with the president Alexander Stubb, and the prime minister Petteri Orpo, to discuss the current situation related to continued support for Ukraine and finding a lasting and just solution.	
Latvia	Riga	26 March	Karis met with President Edgars Rinkēvičs, and they opened the new and most modern Estonian Embassy in the center of the Old Town at an opening ceremony (address: Pils iela 8/10, Centra rajons).	
Italy	Bologna, Rome	31 March – 3 April	On the first day, Alar Karis, together with his wife Sirje Karis and Estonian Minister of Culture Heidy Purga, participated in the world's largest children's book fair in Bologna, where the Estonian fair was on display. Alar Karis met with Bologna Mayor Matteo Lepore at the Town Hall and made an entry in the guest book, the first entry of which dates back to 1945. On April 2, Alar Karis and his wife Sirje Karis met with President Sergio Mattarella and his daughter Laura Mattarella in Rome, where the aim was cooperation in the fields of defense, culture and education, and in addition, they talked about international digital, cyber and artificial intelligence development projects. The importance of European solidarity and recognized Italy for its contribution to the security of the Baltic region. Italian president Sergio Mattarella awarded Alar Karis and his wife Sirje Karis with Italy's highest decoration - the Grand Cross of the Order of Merit of Italy. Alar Karis met with Lorenzo Fontana, President of the Italian Chamber of Deputies, when the issue of European security and solidarity was discussed. Alar Karis spoke at the NATO Defense College in Rome and visited the headquarters of the European Union's maritime rescue mission IRINI. On April 3, Alar Karis attended the La Sapienza University of Rome, where he was open to new ideas and technologies.	
Vatican City	Vatican City	3 April	Alar Karis met with Vatican Secretary of State Pietro Parolin, where the topic was the Catholic Church for its activities in Estonia and speaking out for world peace.	
Vatican City	Vatican City	26 April	Attended the funeral of Pope Francis at St. Peter's Square.	
Poland	Warsaw	28-29 April	Alar Karis participated in the Three Seas Initiative Summit, where they met with Polish president Andrzej Duda, Lithuanian president Gitanas Nausėda, Latvian president Edgars Rinkēvičs, Czech president Petr Pavel, Hungarian president Tamás Sulyok, Slovak president Peter Pellegrini, Bulgarian president Rumen Radev, Romanian Acting president Ilie Bolojan, Greek prime minister Kyriakos Mitsotakis, Croatian foreign minister Gordan Grlić-Radman, Austrian Federal Minister for Integration Susanne Raab, Albanian president Bajram Begaj, and Montenegrin president Jakov Milatović, where they discussed improving North-South strategic connections and increasing the competitiveness and security of the European Union through strong transatlantic cooperation . Alar Karis' wife, Sirje Karis, participated in the Heads of State Spouses Program in Warsaw, where she attended a concert by Polish Children's Foundation scholarship holders at the Belweder Palace and visited the King Jan III Museum.	
Germany	Dresden, Mittweida, Chemnitz, Leipzig	7–8 May	On first day he participated in Dresden with the prime minister of Saxony Michael Kretschmer and the Minister of Economics of Saxony Dirk Panter, where he opened the Estonian-Saxony business forum. Alar Karis and his wife Sirje Karis opened the exhibition “Spiegel im Spiegel” in the Lipsiusbau art hall in Dresden. Alar Karis lit a candle in memory of the victims of the war in the Dresden Church of Our Lady. In the evening, Alar Karis opened the new office premises of Nortal in Dresden, where Estonian and German entrepreneurs operated. On next day in the afternoon, Alar Karis opened an Estonian-Saxony business seminar in Mittweida and at a meeting with city leaders, the strengthening economic and cultural relations between the two regions were confirmed. In the evening, Alar Karis and his mayor Urmas Klaas from Tartu visited Chemnitz, which had been selected as the European Capital of Culture for 2025. Alar Karis and Urmas Klaas visited the exhibition “European Realities” in Chemnitz. Alar Karis also visited the Skeleton factory near Leipzig.	
Lithuania	Vilnius	2 June	Karis met with the president of the Republic of Lithuania Gitanas Nausėda, the president of Latvia Edgars Rinkēvičs, the president of Poland Andrzej Duda, the president of the Republic of Czech Republic Petr Pavel, the president of Slovakia Peter Pellegrini, the president of Romania Nicușor Dan, the president of Ukraine Volodymyr Zelenskyy, the prime minister of Norway Jonas Gahr Støre, the prime minister of Denmark Mette Frederiksen, the prime minister of Finland Petteri Orpo, the Minister of Foreign Affairs of Sweden Maria Malmer Stenergarde, the Minister of Foreign Affairs of Iceland Þorgerður Katrín Gunnarsdóttir, the Minister of Defence of Bulgaria Atanas Zapryanov, the Minister of Defence of Hungary Kristóf Szalay-Bobrovniczky and NATO secretary general Mark Rutte, when the discussion was in the context of preparations for the NATO summit.	
Montenegro	Cetinje	5–7 June	On the 5 June, at noon, Alar Karis flew a chartered Heston Airlines Airbus A320-232 (reg. LY-DOM) to Tivat Airport. On the 6 June, Alar Karis met with the president Jakov Milatović, Deputy Prime Minister of Montenegro Filip Ivanović and Deputy Speaker of the Parliament of Montenegro Zdenka Popović. The discussion focused on support for Montenegro's efforts to join the European Union and the importance of alliance relations in NATO and in building a digital state, especially in creating an e-state and strengthening cybersecurity, as well as opportunities for bilateral cooperation in promoting education, economy, culture and tourism.	
Finland	Kultaranta	16–17 June	Karis met with Finnish president Alexander Stubb and Latvian president Edgars Rinkēvičs at the 13th Kultaranta Talks event held at the Finnish president's summer residence in Kultaranta, located near the city of Turku, where the discussion focused on the security situation in Europe, transatlantic cooperation, and the Middle East, where the Estonian head of state participated in the discussions for the first time this year.	
Spain	Seville,	29 June – 1 July	Karis met with King Felipe VI at the International Conference on Financing for Development in Seville, along with Queen Letizia, Spanish prime minister Pedro Sánchez, UN secretary-general António Guterres, European Commission president Ursula von der Leyen, Emir of Qatar Tamīm ibn Ḩamad Āl Thānī, King Mswati III of Swaziland, Polish president Andrzej Duda, President of North Macedonia Gordana Siljanovska-Davkova, Serbian president Aleksandar Vučić, Ecuadorian president Daniel Noboea, Panamanian president José Raúl Mulino, Mozambiquean president Daniel Chapo, Senegalese president Bassirou Diomaye Faye, Sierra Leonean vice president Mohamed Juldeh Jalloh, Maldives Vice President Hussain Mohamed Latheefwith, Prime Minister Denys Shmyhal of Ukraine, Prime Minister Khadga Prasad Sharma Oli of Nepal, Prime Minister Gaston Browne of Antigua and Barbuda, and Foreign Minister Þorgerður Katrín Gunnarsdóttir of Iceland, when the discussion was about the innovation of development cooperation, where those who decide their own path can be supported by partner countries and the international community.	
Switzerland	Geneva	10-11 July	Karis attended the Technology Summit in Geneva, where he met with Doreen Bogdan-Martin, Secretary-General of the International Telecommunication Union, during which the discussion focused on the security of critical infrastructure in the Baltic Sea region, including how to better prevent the increasing number of deliberate interferences in radio communications and ensure the security of submarine communication cables.	
Latvia	Ramata,	22 August	Karis met with President Edgars Rinkēvičs at 11:30 on the Ramatas bridge, where a joint bicycle ride took place to celebrate the 500th anniversary of the first book written in Latvian and Estonian. They visited the Ramatas library and guesthouse and met with local residents. In the afternoon, they visited Mõisaküla, near the Latvian border, where they visited St. Magdalena Church, the Mõisaküla Museum and the library.	
Poland	Warsaw	28 August	Karis flew a Diamond Sky Pilatus PC-12/47E NGX (reg. ES-SAS and flight number DMS611) to Warsaw Frédéric Chopin Airport at the invitation of Polish president Karol Nawrocki. He met with presidents of Lithuania and Latvia, Danish prime minister Mette Frederiksen and Ukrainian president Volodymyr Zelenskyy via video link at the Belvedere Palace in Warsaw, where they discussed support for Ukraine and strengthening European defense capabilities. Alar Karis flew a Diamond Sky Pilatus PC-12/47E NGX (reg. ES-SAS and flight number DMS611) back to Tallinn Airport in the evening.	
Slovenia	Bled	1–2 September	Karis participated in the international foreign policy and security conference in Bled, where he met with Slovenian president Nataša Pirc Musar, Montenegrin president Jakov Milatović and Czech president Petr Pavel, where the discussion was that Russia must be kept within its internationally recognized borders even after the end of the aggression in Ukraine. Alar Karis visited the Slovenian National Institute of Chemistry, where he introduced research, cancer treatment and electrochemistry studies.	
Belgium	Brussels	3 September	Karis met with the president of the European Parliament, Roberta Metsola, at the European Council in Brussels and with NATO secretary general Mark Rutte at NATO Headquarters, where the discussion focused on opposing Russian aggression and security in Ukraine.	
United States	New York City	22–24 September	Karis met with Secretary-General António Guterres at the 80th UN General Assembly in New York, where they participated in a high-level meeting celebrating the 80th anniversary of the UN and a high-level climate event. Alar Karis opened a high-level side event organized at the initiative of Estonia together with the International Peace Institute, which will discuss the organization of the election of the UN secretary-general. Alar Karis spoke on behalf of the Baltic States at the UN Security Council open debate on peace and security in Ukraine, where he took part in the 5th summit of the Crimean Platform, an international mechanism initiated by Ukrainian president Volodymyr Zelenskyy in 2020 to end the occupation of Crimea. Alar Karis participated in the UN Security Council open debate on artificial intelligence, where he stressed the need to use artificial intelligence to ensure peace and security in a responsible and people-centred manner. Alar Karis, together with Latvian president Edgars Rinkēvičs and Lithuanian president Gitanas Nausėda, participated in the Concordia Summit discussion on the sidelines of the UN General Assembly High-Level Week, where they focused on strengthening Europe's energy security and independence. They also met with UN secretary-general António Guterres. Alar Karis met with Lithuanian president Gitanas Nausėda and Polish president Karol Nawrocki, where they focused on strengthening Europe's energy security and independence. Alar Karis met with Kenyan president William Ruto and Namibian president Netumbo Nandi-Ndaitwah, where they discussed closer cooperation and security in Europe and Africa. Alar Karis also met with Council of Europe Secretary General Alain Berset and attended a reception for US president Donald Trump. Alar Karis met with High Representative of the European Union for Foreign Affairs and Security Policy and Vice-President of the European Commission Kaja Kallas on the street in front of the UN General Assembly.	
United Kingdom	London	6–8 October	Karis and his wife Sirje Karis participated in London, where the aim was to strengthen Estonian-British relations, primarily in the fields of culture, digital economy and health technology, and to participate in a concert dedicated to Arvo Pärt's 90th birthday at the Barbican Centre. Alar Karis introduced the Estonian Embassy in London to British investors to present the strengths of Estonia's digital economy and innovation. Alar Karis participated in King's College London, where cooperation opportunities for the practical use of research results and the development of new solutions in medicine were discussed. On October 7, Alar Karis and Sirje Karis participated in the Southbank Centre arts center, which aimed to promote cultural cooperation and strengthen ties between the Estonian and British creative industries. In the evening, they participated in a concert celebrating the 90th birthday of composer Arvo Pärt at the Barbican Center. On October 8, Alar Karis met with the heir to the throne of the United Kingdom, His Royal Highness Prince William of Wales William, at Windsor Castle. The meeting focused on cooperation between Estonia and the United Kingdom in the fields of culture, digital development and science, and also discussed the international security situation.	
United States	New York City, Chicago	21–29 October	On October 21–25, Alar Karis, together with his wife Sirje Karis and Estonian Minister of Culture Heidy Purga, participated in New York, where the goal was to attend a concert dedicated to Arvo Pärt's 90th birthday at Carnegie Hall, and the focus of the meetings and performances was on strengthening creative industry and cultural cooperation, business and economic cooperation, research and development activities, and the possibilities of using artificial intelligence in education. Alar Karis gave a lecture at Yale and the University of Chicago, where he spoke about the core issues of Estonian foreign and security policy, the importance of strengthening democracy in today's world, Estonian digital services, and the implementation of artificial intelligence. Alar Karis met with New York Mayor Eric Adams, where the possibilities of science and education, e-governance, economic, and cultural cooperation were discussed. Alar Karis met with United Nations General Assembly UN President Annalena Baerbock in New York to discuss the organization's reforms and leadership, as well as support for Ukraine. Alar Karis and Sirje Karis visited the Scandinavian House, where Dorian Supin's documentary about Arvo Pärt is being presented, and introduced the ISCP program at the Center for Contemporary Art and the Metropolitan Museum of Art Costume Institute to the creative industries delegation in New York. On October 26–29, Alar Karis met with Chicago Mayor Brandon Johnson and participated in a discussion on artificial intelligence organized by one of the world's most renowned international law firms Baker and McKenzie and a panel discussion at the Chicago Think Tank. Alar Karis visited the Chicago Estonian House for the first time with the Estonian community.	
Kazakhstan	Astana	16–19 November	On the morning of 16 November, Alar Karis, his wife Sirje and a business delegation of nearly 50 people flew at 07:34 on a specially ordered Latvian aircraft in the colors of the Estonian flag airBaltic Airbus A220-300 aircraft with registration number YL-CSJ and flight number BT7701, with a stopover at Tbilisi Airport. On the morning of 17 November, Alar Karis visited the Rectors' Forum at Nazarbayev University in Astana and gave a lecture to students, where he spoke on the topics. In the afternoon, Alar Karis and his wife Sirje visited the National Library of Kazakhstan, where he donated a number of Estonian books to the National Library of Kazakhstan on the occasion of Estonian Book 500. In the afternoon, Alar Karis and his wife Sirje Karis, Estonian Minister of Infrastructure Kuldar Leis, Estonian Minister of Justice and Digital Affairs Liisa-Ly Pakosta, and the chairman of the Riigikogu Committee on Culture Liina Kersna met in Astana with President Kassym-Jomart Tokayev and Parliament Speaker Erlan Qoşanov, with the aim of strengthening cooperation between the two countries in the economy, education, and digital fields. On the morning of the 18 November, Alar Karis visited the Astana digital hub and participated in a thematic roundtable on AI and education with Deputy Prime Minister Roman Sklyar, tehisaru and digital minister Žaslan Madijev. Alar Karis with the president of Kazakhstan Kassym-Jomart Tokayev at the Kazakhstan-Estonia Business Forum. In the afternoon, Alar Karis with his wife Sirje Karis and the chair of the Riigikogu Committee on Culture Liina Kersna visited the Kazakhstan National Museum, where the Estonian Folk Museum opened and presented the glove exhibition "Covered with Hands". In the evening, Alar Karis and his wife Sirje Karis celebrated the friendship between Estonia and Kazakhstan through music, which was an integral part of Estonian culture and identity. On the morning of 19 November, Alar Karis and his wife Sirje Karis laid flowers in Aamol in memory of repressed Estonians at the Akmolinsk homeland traitors' women's camp - the camp of sorrow. In the afternoon, Alar Karis and his wife Sirje Karis visited the traditions of Kazakhstan, where freedom was embodied by a horse for the Kazakhs. In the afternoon, Alar Karis, his wife Sirje and a business delegation of nearly 50 people flew home at 14:48 again on a specially ordered Latvian plane in Estonian flag colors, an airBaltic Airbus A220-300 aircraft with registration number YL-CSJ and flight number BT7702, where they again made a stopover at Tbilisi airport.	
Latvia	Riga	4 December	Karis met with Latvian president Edgars Rinkēvičs and Lithuanian president Gitanas Nausėda to discuss regional security and strengthening transatlantic relations. Alar Karis, together with the heads of state of Latvia and Lithuania, visited an exhibition at the National Library of Latvia, which reminded us of the importance of the written word in the formation of our independence and the spiritual freedom of our people.	

== 2026 ==
Country	Areas visited	Dates	Details	Image
Portugal	Lisbon	15–16 January	Karis met with Portuguese president Marcelo Nuno Duarte Rebelo de Sousa, Speaker of the Portuguese Parliament José Pedro Aguiar Branco, Portuguese foreign minister Paulo Rangel and Lisbon Mayor Carlos Moedas in Lisbon, with the aim of developing good relations between Estonia and Portugal, including defense cooperation within the framework of NATO and economic relations, as well as scientific and educational cooperation. Alar Karis, together with Portuguese president Marcelo Nuno Duarte Rebelo de Sousa, opened the Estonia and Estonia-Portugal Business Forum in Lisbon, which focused on strengthening economic ties between the two countries and digital innovation. On the evening of January 15, Alar Karis, together with Portuguese president Marcelo Nuno Duarte Rebelo de Sousa, attended an event at the Thalia Theater, where violinist Hans Christian Aavik and pianist Havryil Sydoryk gave a musical gift to Portugal . On the afternoon of January 16, Alar Karis, together with Portuguese president Marcelo Nuno Duarte Rebelo de Sousa, flew from Lisbon on the Portuguese presidential state plane, a Dassault Falcon 900B aircraft with registration number 27404, to Monte Real Air Base, where they participated to best ensure solidarity and cooperation.	
UAE	Dubai	3–4 February	Karis participated in an international high-level summit in Dubai, where the impact of the artificial intelligence sector on security and the long-term survival of society was discussed with heads of government and state, top private sector executives and industry leaders. During the event, Karis met with the president of the United Arab Emirates, Mohamed bin Zayed Al Nahyan, Vice President and Prime Minister of the United Arab Emirates, Mohammed bin Rashid Al Maktoum, President of North Macedonia, Gordana Siljanovska-Davkova, President of Paraguay, Santiago Peña, President of Ecuador, Daniel Noboa, Prime Minister of Latvia, Evika Siliņa, and Omar Al Olam, Minister of State for Artificial Intelligence, Digital Economy and Remote Work Applications of the United Arab Emirates. On February 4, Alar Karis gave the opening speech at the Government Services Forum, which was held as part of the Future Summit, focusing on the role of artificial intelligence in developing public services and shaping a digital state based on trust and people-centered governance. And Alar Karis discussed the future of education with the head of the Fiker Institute think tank and opened an exhibition dedicated to the 90th anniversary of Jüri Arrak's birth.	
Italy	Milan	5–10 February	Karis and his wife Sirje Karis attended 2026 Winter Olympics met with Italian president Sergio Mattarella and his daughter Laura Mattarella, Italian prime minister Giorgia Meloni and International Olympic Committee president Kirsty Coventry, and participated in high-level events related to the Milan–Cortina Winter Olympics at the San Siro football stadium, where, together with other heads of state and government (including Finnish president Alexander Stubb, Latvian president Edgars Rinkēvičs, German president Frank-Walter Steinmeier and Lithuanian prime minister Inga Ruginienė). At the invitation of the president of the International Olympic Committee, they attended a dinner for heads of state dedicated to the Olympic Games and a reception for the Italian Head of State. Alar Karis and his wife Sirje visited the Olympic Village in Cortina d'Ampezzo, met with Estonian athletes and their supporters, and will be following the Estonian athletes' competitions in the Olympic Games program.	
India	New Delhi	17–19 February	Karis visited the Estonian Embassy in Delhi, where he celebrated the 108th anniversary of the Republic. Alar met with Indian president Draupadi Murmu, Indian prime minister Narendra Modi, and Swiss president Guy Parmelin in Delhi, where they participated in the AI Impact Summit and the Friends of Digital Government Summit.	
United Kingdom	London, Oxford	23–24 March	On the first day, Alar Karis attended the opening of the Konrad Mägi painting exhibition in London and met with members of the British Parliament's Friendship Group. In the afternoon, Alar Karis met with Estonian students and working researchers at Oxford and discussed opportunities for cooperation. On the second day, Alar Karis attended the Global Government Forum innovation conference, which aimed to share the experience of Estonia's digital government.	
Netherlands	Utrecht, Noordwijk The Hague	8–9 April	He and his wife Sirje Karis met with the Mayor of Utrecht, Sharon Dijksma, in Utrecht and they visited the Utrecht Science Park and the biotechnology company Genmab, and the European Space Agency in Noordwijk. Sirje Karis visited the Princess Máxima Pediatric Oncology Center in Utrecht. The day ended with Alar Karis visiting the Estonian Embassy building, where Ambassador Paul Teesalu hosted a reception and the contribution of Estonian experts to organizations located in the Netherlands such as Europol, Eurojust and the European Space Agency was highly appreciated. On April 9, Alar Karis met with King Willem-Alexander of the Netherlands and Prime Minister Rob Jetten in The Hague, with the aim of strengthening bilateral relations between Estonia and the Netherlands in the areas of security and defense, including the development of innovation, investment and trade, and continued strong support for Ukraine and transatlantic relations. Alar Karis participated in a public lecture at Erasmus University in Rotterdam, where the discussion was on increasing Europe's self-confidence in world politics.	
Lithuania	Vilnius, Kaunas	15–17 April	On April 15, Alar Karis and his wife Sirje made an extraordinary flight on a airBaltic Airbus A220-300 with registration number YL-CSI and flight number BT902 to Vilnius Airport. Alar Karis and his wife Sirje met with President Gitanas Nausėda and his wife Diana Nausėdienė, Prime Minister Inga Ruginienė, Speaker of the Lithuanian Parliament Juozas Olekas, and Vilnius Mayor Valdas Benkunskas, with the aim of strengthening security and defense cooperation, strengthening NATO and regional defense capabilities, solid support for Ukraine, and strategic infrastructure projects, including the construction of the Rail Baltic railway connection. Alar Karis and Lithuanian president Gitanas Nausėda opened the Estonian-Lithuanian Business Forum in Kaunas. Alar Karis and his wife Sirje visited the Lithuanian National Archives, where they were introduced to archival materials from the history of Estonian-Lithuanian relations, to celebrate the 105th anniversary of the establishment of Diplomatic relations between Estonia and Lithuania. The Head of State was accompanied on the visit by Riigikogu members Enn Eesmaa and Luisa Värk, Estonian Minister of Defence Hanno Pevkur, Tartu Mayor Urmas Klaas and a business and cultural delegation, which discussed strengthening the Estonian-Lithuanian strategic partnership, regional security and defence cooperation, infrastructure connections and expanding economic and cultural cooperation. Lithuanian president Gitanas Nausėda and his wife Diana Nausėdienė hosted a state dinner in honour of President Alar Karis and Sirje Karis. On April 16, Alar Karis and his wife Sirje visited Kaunas, where Kaunas Mayor Visvaldas Matijošaitis welcomed the visiting Estonian presidential couple in front of the former Estonian embassy building at K. Donelaičio 71 street. Alar Karis attended the ceremony of conferring an honorary doctorate at Vytautas Magnus University in Kaunas. Alar Karis and Lithuanian president Gitanas Nausėda flew a Lithuanian Air Force Eurocopter AS365 Dauphin helicopter to inspect the construction site of the Rail Baltica railway connection and visited the Rukla military base. Alar Karis and his wife Sirje and Lithuanian president Gitanas Nausėda and his wife Diana visited the Kaunas State Music Theatre to see Francesco Cilea's opera "Adriana Lecouvreur". Sirje Karis, together with Diana Nausėdienė, visited the Ukrainian Center in Vilnius, where the effects of war on children's mental health were discussed, and in Kaunas, the Mokslo sala Research and Education Center, the neonatal department of Kaunas Hospital, and the M. K. Čiurlionis National Art Museum. On the morning of April 17, he and his wife Sirje flew back to Tallinn Airport on an exceptional low-cost airline Wizz Air Airbus A321neo with registration number HA-LGI and flight number W61967.	
Greece	Athens	20–22 April	On the first day, Alar Karis met with the president Konstantinos Tasoulas, in Athens, where they discussed common democratic values and respect for international law. Alar Karis also met with the Greek Minister of Education and Religious Affairs, Sofia Zacharaki, where they discussed educational and cultural cooperation and opportunities for digital cooperation, where they participated in an innovation workshop. Alar Karis also met with the speaker of the Greek Parliament, Nikitas Kaklamanis, where they discussed strengthening cooperation between the Estonian and Greek parliaments and continued support for Ukraine. The official visit was to strengthen the partnership and cooperation between Estonia and Greece. The discussions focused on continuing support for Ukraine and the isolation of Russia on the international stage, as well as the impact of events in the Middle East and the Eastern Mediterranean on Europe. Alar Karis laid a wreath at the Tomb of the Unknown Soldier in Syntagma Square in Athens. Alar Karis visited the Acropolis of Athens. On next day, Alar Karis participated in the European Union Cybersecurity Agency, where he gave an overview of the prevention, detection and resolution of information security problems in the member states. Alar Karis met with priest Father Rafael at the Neromylois Church and visited the Agias Monastery of St. John the Baptist, which had a special connection with Estonia. On the last day, Alar Karis, together with Greek president Konstantinos Tasoulas, participated in the Delphi Economic Forum, where he met with Greek president Konstantinos Tasoulas, Prince Albert II of Monaco, former Turkish president Abdullah Gül, and Attica Regional Governor Nikos Chardalias.	
Finland	Helsinki	27–29 April	On April 27, Alar Karis and his wife Sirje Karis, together with a 90-member delegation, departed from Tallinn Port's Terminal D, where the Estonian fast passenger ferry MyStar sailed to Helsinki Länsisatama. On April 28, Alar Karis and his wife Sirje met in Helsinki with President Alexander Stubb and his wife Suzanne Innes-Stubb, Prime Minister Petteri Orpo, Speaker of the Finnish Parliament Jussi Halla-aho, and Mayor of Helsinki Daniel Sazonov, where they discussed the strengthening of bilateral relations between Estonia and Finland, cooperation in NATO, economic and defense cooperation, security in the Baltic Sea region, support for Ukraine in Russia's war of aggression, the effects of the Middle East conflict on the European economy and security, and transatlantic relations. The head of state was accompanied on the visit by Minister of Defence Hanno Pevkur, Chief of Defence Andrus Merilo, and Riigikogu members Henn Põlluaas and Mati Raidma. In the evening, the Estonian and Finnish presidential couples attended a state dinner at the presidential palace. On the morning of April 29, Alar Karis and his wife Sirje laid wreaths at the Hietaniemi Cemetery and at the memorial to the Finnish volunteers who fell in the Estonian War of Independence in the Old Church Park. Alar Karis and Finnish president Alexander Stubb participated in a business forum on defense industry cooperation and visited the Finnish National Defense University and Aalto University in Santahamina. Sirje Karis and Finnish First Lady Suzanne Innes-Stubb visited the Ateneum Art Museum in Helsinki, the SOS Children's Village in Espoo, and the Diakonie Foundation, which focuses on culture, education, and social issues, including supporting children's mental health. Alar Karis and his wife Sirje and Finnish Alexander Stubbi and his wife Suzanne Innes-Stubbi visited the Museum of Contemporary Art Kiasma and the Helsinki Central Library Oodi together, where they discussed literature and reading topics and met with students from the Finnish-Estonian language school Latokartano Primary School. In the afternoon, Alar Karis and Finnish president Alexander Stubb participated in a business forum for defense industry companies at the Estonian Embassy, where the discussion focused on how science, the defense industry and the defense forces could truly come together, which was addressed by Minister of Defense Hanno Pevkur and Director of the International Center for Defense Studies Kristi Raik. In the afternoon, Alar Karis and Finnish president Alexander Stubb attended the Santahamina National Defence College, where they discussed the development of the Estonian Defence Forces to today's close cooperation on land, sea and air, planning and exercises. Alar Karis and his wife Sirje and Finnish president Alexander Stubb and his wife Suzanne Innes-Stubbi traveled on the Finnish presidential yacht "Kultaranta VIII", where they sailed back and forth to Santahamina Island.	
Romania	Bucharest	12–14 May	Alar Karis met with Romanian president Nicușor Dan, NATO secretary general Mark Rutte, Lithuanian president Gitanas Nausėda, Latvian president Edgars Rinkēvičs, Polish president Karol Nawrocki, Czech president Petr Pavel, Slovak president Peter Pellegrini, Finnish president Alexander Stubb, Ukrainian president Volodymyr Zelenskyy, Danish Acting prime minister Mette Frederiksen, Norwegian foreign minister Espen Barth Eide, Swedish Minister of Defense Pål Jonsson, US Under Secretary of State for Arms Control and International Security Thomas DiNanno, Icelandic Secretary of State Benedikt Árnason, Bulgarian Ambassador to NATO Nikolaj Milkov, and Hungarian Ambassador to Bucharest Katalin Kissné Hlatki, during the Bucharest Summit, where the discussion focused on the security situation in Europe, strengthening the defense of the Alliance's eastern flank, and preparations for the NATO summit in Ankara.	
Lithuania	Vilnius	26 May	In the afternoon, Alar Karis flew to Vilnius Airport with a Pilatus PC-12 NGX (reg. ES-SKI and flight number DMS811) of the airline Diamond Sky. Alar Karis, together with the president of Lithuania Gitanas Nausėda and the president of Latvia Edgars Rinkēvičs, met with the president of the European Commission Ursula von der Leyen and the European Commissioner for Defence and Space Andrius Kubilius, where they discussed the security situation in the Baltic region and the strengthening of European defence capabilities, as well as a coordinated response to the drone incidents of recent weeks, which had also been registered in the Baltic states in Finland. In the evening, Alar Karis flew back to Tallinn Airport with a Pilatus PC-12 NGX (reg. ES-SKI and flight number DMS811) of the airline Diamond Sky.	
Poland	Jurata, Poznań	27–29 June	On 1st day, Alar Karis, together with Latvian president Edgars Rinkēvičs, Lithuanian president Gitanas Nausėda, Slovak president Peter Pellegrini, Czech president Petr Pavel, and Romanian president Nicușor Dan, met with Polish president Karol Nawrocki in Jurata for an informal meeting , where the discussion focused on preparations for the NATO Ankara Summit, strengthening European defense capabilities, and continued support for Ukraine. On next day, they participated in a commemoration event in Poznań to mark the 70th anniversary of the protests.	
Switzerland	Geneva	6–8 July	Karis attended the annual event of the artificial intelligence industry, where he met with UN secretary-general António Guterres, UN General Assembly president Annalena Baerbock, and El Salvador vice president Félix Ulloa, during which the discussion focused on the digital future.	
Ukraine	Kyiv	24 August	He and his wife Sirje Karis attended the 35th anniversary of Ukraine 's independence in Kiev, where they met with the President of Finland, Alexander Stubb, and his wife Suzanne Innes-Stubbe, the President of Lithuania, Gitanas Nausėda, and his wife Diana Nausėdienė, the President of Moldova, Maia Sandu, the President of Romania, Mirabela Grădinaru, the President of Serbia, Tamara Vučić, the President of Slovenia, Aleš Musare, the President of the European Council, António Costa, the Prime Minister of Great Britain, Andy Burnham, the Prime Minister of Luxembourg, Luc Frieden, and the Minister of Foreign Affairs of Sweden, Maria Malmer Stenergarde. Alar Karis, together with First Lady Sirje Karis, participated in the sixth summit of first ladies and gentlemen in Kyiv, which was attended by Ukrainian president Volodymyr Zelenskyy and his wife Olena Zelenska, Finnish President Alexander Stubb and his wife Suzanne Innes-Stubbe, Lithuanian President Gitanas Nausėda and his wife Diana Nausėdienė, Romanian President Mirabela Grădinaru, Serbian First Lady Tamara Vučić, and Slovenian President Aleš Musare.	
Latvia	Līgatne, Riga	28 August	In the morning, Alar Karis and his wife Sirje Karis met with Edgars Rinkēvičs in Līgatne on a farewell visit, where he invited them to visit the open-air stage, bicycle museum, paper mill, and nature trails in Līgatne. At noon, Alar Karis and his wife Sirje Karis visited the Estonian Embassy in Riga for the last time, where they signed the guest book. In the afternoon, Alar Karis and his wife Sirje Karis attended the Latvian National Opera, including a meeting with Latvian President Edgars Rinkēvičs and Tartu Mayor Urmas Klaas. The Vanemuine National Theatre staged a performance in which the characters from "Prayer. Homage to Arvo Pärt" played.	
Italy	Monza, Milan, Venice, Rome	4–7 September	On September 4, Alar Karis, together with his wife Sirje Karis and the President of the Estonian Motorsports Association Toivo Asmer, met with Paul Aron at the Monza circuit in Monza, where he introduced the 2026 Formula 1 season and helped advance his career. In the afternoon, Alar Karis and his wife Sirje Karis visited the Honorary Consul of Estonia in Milan. On the morning of September 5, Alar Karis visited the Filodrammatici Theater in Milan, where he launched a music festival. In the afternoon, Alar Karis visited the Bolt company to introduce it. On September 6, Alar Karis and his wife Sirje Karis visited the Estonian Pavilion in Venice, where they met with Merike Estna and Maria Arusoo, director of the Estonian Center for Contemporary Art, in a community building adapted as a studio. On the morning of September 7, Alar Karis visited the Estonian Embassy in Rome, where the ambassadors working in Italy are based. In the afternoon, Alar Karis and his wife Sirje Karis met with Italian President Sergio Mattarella, where they discussed the development of cultural, educational and economic relations between Estonia and Italy, as well as the opportunities and impacts of the artificial intelligence sector.	
Norway	Oslo	9 September	Karis traveled to Oslo at the invitation of King Haakon VIII of Norway to attend the funeral of King Harald V of Norway.	
United States	New York City	20–24 September	Before the UN General Assembly on the 21 September, Alar Karis, Permanent Representative of the State of Kuwait to the UN (located at 321 East 44th Street, Manhattan, New York), met with Sabah Al-Khalid Al-Sabah, Crown Prince of Kuwait , to discuss the security situation, Iranian and Russian attacks on their neighbors, common interests of small countries, and digital cooperation. After the meeting, Alar Karis, Permanent Representative of the State of Kuwait to the UN, visited the Jazz Record Center record store , 8th floor, room 804, in Manhattan, Chelsea (located at 236 West 26th Street). In the afternoon, he and his wife Sirje Karis visited the Estonian House for the last time, where it celebrated its 80th anniversary and performed at a reception hosted by the Estonian Ambassador to the United States, Hannes Hanso, and in the presence of Carl Skonberg, President of the Estonian Educational Society of New York. Then Alar Karis discovered the Ernest Jaakson section of the street at the corner of 2nd Avenue and Tunnel Exit Street on East 34th Street in New York City. After the discovery, Alar Karis and his wife Sirje Karis visited the Strand Bookstore at the corner of Roadway and East 12th Street. On next day, Karis attend the 81th United Nations General Assembly, met for the last time with Latvian President Edgars Rinkēvičs, Lithuanian President Gitanas Nausėda, and Polish President Karol Nawrocki, where he received Secretary-General António Guterres, who participated in a luncheon discussion on assistance to Ukraine and UN reform. On the morning of September 22, Alar Karis and Estonian Foreign Minister Margus Tsahkna attended US President Donald Trump's speech at the UN General Assembly Hall, where Alar Karis met with Czech President Petr Pavel and Jordanian Crown Prince Hussein bin Abdullah al-Hashimi. Alar Karis delivered a speech at the UN Global "AI for Good" Commission, where he also met with European Commission President Ursula von der Leyen, French President Emmanuel Macron, Hungarian President András Bálint Baka and International Telecommunication Union Secretary-General Doreen Bogdan-Martin. He, together with Lithuanian President Gitanas Nausėda and Czech President Petr Pavel, attended an extraordinary session of the International Criminal Court in New York, where, at the invitation of Ukrainian President Volodymyr Zelenskyy, the Crimean Platform Summit was held, where the illegality of Russia's aggression and occupation of Crimea was discussed. On September 23, Alar Karis delivered a state address at the UN General Assembly hall, where the topic was that the multilateral world order, centered on the UN and its charter, has reached a significant turning point. On September 24, Alar Karis also met with Colombian Vice President José Manuel Restrepo at the UN General Assembly to discuss education and digital and cyber cooperation. Alar Karis attended an event for the Artificial Intelligence Security Alliance, where he met with Rwandan Prime Minister Justin Nsengiyumva. Alar Karis participated in the AI panel discussion.	
Germany	Berlin	28 September	Karis and his wife Sirje Karis flew to Berlin Airport on a Cessna Citation CJ4 Gen2 (reg. HB-VJT) of the Finnish airline ACXJET. They met with German President Frank-Walter Steinmeier and his wife Elke Büdenbender, who were on their final visit to Berlin, where they discussed close relations, shared values, and strong alliances in the European Union and NATO.	
Poland	Warsaw	29 September	In the morning, Karis and his wife Sirje Karis flew to Warsaw Airport on a Cessna Citation CJ4 Gen2 (reg. HB-VJT) commercial aircraft of the Finnish airline ACXJET. They met with the outgoing President of Poland, Karol Nawrocki, and his wife Marta Nawrocki, where they discussed security, connections, and people-to-people ties.	
Lithuania	Vilnius	29 September	In the afternoon, Karis and his wife Sirje Karis flew to Vilnius Airport on a Cessna Citation CJ4 Gen2 (reg. HB-VJT) of the Finnish airline ACXJET. They met with the President of Lithuania Gitanas Nausėda and his wife Diana Nausėdienė, where they discussed strengthening NATO's eastern flank, increasing its defense capabilities, and standing up for it. In the evening, they headed to Tallinn Airport on a Cessna Citation CJ4 Gen2 (reg. HB-VJT) of the Finnish airline ACXJET.	
Finland	Helsinki	1 October	In the morning, Karis and his wife Sirje Karis started from Terminal D of the Port of Tallinn, where they boarded the Estonian fast passenger ferry MyStar to Helsinki's West Port. They visited the Estonian Embassy in Helsinki for the last time. At lunch, they met with Finnish President Alexander Stubb and his wife Suzanne Innes-Stubb, where they discussed culture and education, close economic cooperation, and common security.	
Sweden	Stockholm	2 October	In the morning, Alar Karis and his wife Sirje Karis flew to Stockholm Airport by passenger plane. They visited the Estonian Embassy in Stockholm for the last time. In the afternoon, they met with King Carl XVI Gustaf and his wife Queen Silvia, who were on their final visit to Stockholm, where they discussed their long history and friendship. This was their last foreign visit.	

== Multilateral meetings ==
Multilateral meetings of the following intergovernmental organizations took place during Alar Karis' presidency (2021–Present).

Group	Year				
Group	2022	2023	2024	2025	2026
UNGA	20–26 September, (United States) New York City	19–26 September, (United States) New York City	24–30 September, (United States) New York City	23 September, (United States) New York City	23–25 September, (United States) New York City
Bucharest Nine	25 February, (Poland) Warsaw	22 February, (Poland) Warsaw	11 June, (Latvia) Riga	2 June, (Lithuania) Vilnius	13 May, (Romania) Bucharest
Bucharest Nine	10 June, (Romania) Bucharest	6 June, (Slovakia) Bratislava	11 June, (Latvia) Riga	2 June, (Lithuania) Vilnius	13 May, (Romania) Bucharest
Three Seas Initiative	20–21 June, (Latvia) Riga	6–7 September, (Romania) Bucharest	11 April, (Lithuania) Vilnius	28–29 April, (Poland) Warsaw	28–29 April, (Croatia) Dubrovnik
██ = Future event ██ = Did not attend / participate.
