= Riisalo =

Riisalo is an Estonian surname. Notable people with the surname include:

- Signe Riisalo (born 1968), Estonian politician
- Tiit Riisalo (born 1967), Estonian politician
