= Nausėda =

- Lithuanian surname
- m.: Nausėda
- f.: (unmarried): Nausėdaitė
- f.: (married): Nausėdienė
- f.: (short): Nausėdė

Nausėda is a Lithuanian surname. Notable people with the surname include:

- Ann Jillian, born Ann Jura Nauseda, American actress and singer
- Alfredas Stasys Nausėda, Lithuanian politician, MP
- Diana Nausėdienė, Lithuanian business manager and lecturer, the First Lady of Lithuania since 2019
- Gitanas Nausėda, economist, 9th President of Lithuania
