= Andra Levite =

First Lady of Latvia from 2019 to 2023

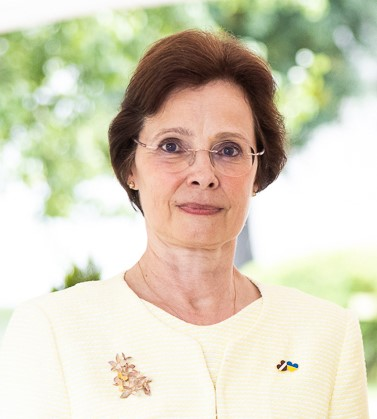
- Levite in July 2022

First Lady of Latvia
- In role 8 July 2019 – 8 July 2023
- President: Egils Levits
- Preceded by: Iveta Vējone
- Succeeded by: Vacant

Personal details
- Born: Andra Apines; 16 November 1962 (age 63) Berlin, West Germany
- Spouse: Egils Levits (m. 1991)
- Children: Indra; Linards
- Education: University of Giessen
- Occupation: Gynecologist; Obstetrician

Andra Levite (born 16 November 1962) is a Latvian gynecologist and obstetrician. Levite is the wife of former President Egils Levits, and was the First Lady of Latvia from 2019 to 2023.

== Biography ==
Levite was born Andra Apines to a Latvian family in West Germany (present-day Germany) on 16 November 1962. She received her medical degree from the University of Giessen in Germany in 1990. In 1991, she married Egils Levits, a Latvian lawyer and politician. The couple have two children, Indra and Linards.

From 1990 until 2019, Levite practiced gynecology and obstetrics in Luxembourg and Germany. Specifically, she is a certified pediatric and adolescent gynecologist, certified obstetrician, and an ultrasonography specialist. She practices in Latvian, English, German and French.

She returned to Latvia full-time upon the election of her husband as President of Latvia and assumed the role of first lady in July 2019.

Levite temporarily left medicine to focus on her new duties as first lady. On 28 April 2020, First Lady Levite resumed her medical profession as a member of the ARS Medical Centre's Women’s Consulting Department in Riga, while continuing to serve as the country's first lady.

In July 2022, Levite spoke in-person at the "Ukraine and the World: The Future We (Re)build Together" Kyiv Summit of First Ladies and Gentlemen at the invitation of First Lady of Ukraine Olena Zelenska and President Volodymyr Zelenskyy. In her remarks, the first lady promised that Latvia would help with the country's reconstruction following the 2022 Russian invasion of Ukraine, noting "Latvia, from the government to businessmen and civil society, is with Ukraine today, tomorrow and certainly also after Ukraine's victory in this brutal war. Latvia is ready to participate in the process of rebuilding Ukraine." In her opening speech, Levite also cited parallels between Ukraine and the Soviet occupation of Latvia, noting that "for more than 50 years, the Latvian people suffered the same pain that the Ukrainians are experiencing now. Therefore, Latvia has without doubt and hesitation provided support to Ukraine in all possible areas and will continue to do so in the future.

On 23 July 2022, Levite and Lithuanian First Lady Diana Nausėdienė visited Irpin, site of the Irpin refugee column shelling attack by Russian forces during the invasion of Ukraine. Levite and Nausėdienė also laid flowers at a mass grave in Bucha, Kyiv Oblast, the site of the March 2022 Bucha massacre of Ukrainian civilians by Russian Armed Forces.

== Honours ==
=== Foreign Honours ===
- Estonia: Member 1st Class of the Order of the Cross of Terra Mariana (19 April 2023)
