= Adamkus (surname) =

- Lithuanian surname
- m.: Adamkus
- f.: (unmarried): Adamkutė
- f.: (married): Adamkienė/Adamkuvienė
- Origin: Adam

Adamkus is a Lithuanian surname derived from a nickname, which is a diminutive of the given name Adam. Notable people with this surname include:

- Valdas Adamkus, former Lithuanian president
- Alma Adamkienė (1927–2023) Lithuanian-American philologist and philanthropist
