= Teringi Landscape Conservation Area =

Protected area in Estonia

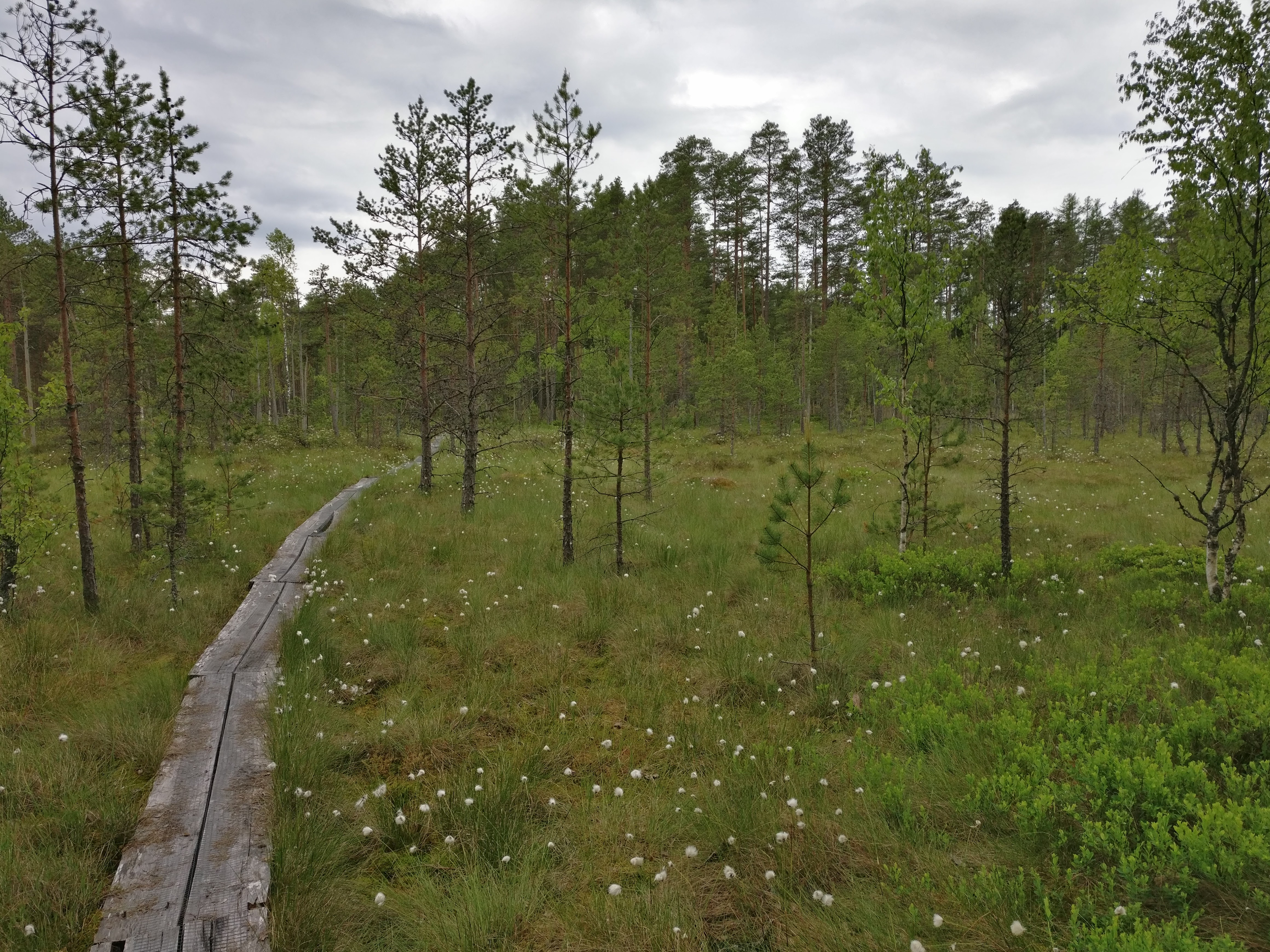

- Location within Estonia
- Location: Estonia
- Coordinates: 57°58′30″N 25°32′30″E
- Area: 322 ha (800 acres)
- Established: 1999 (2005)

Teringi Landscape Conservation Area is a nature park which is located in Viljandi County, Estonia.

The area of the nature park is 322 ha.

The protected area was founded in 1999 to protect landscapes and biodiversity in Karksi Parish, Lilli village.
