= Egils Levits =

President of Latvia from 2019 to 2023

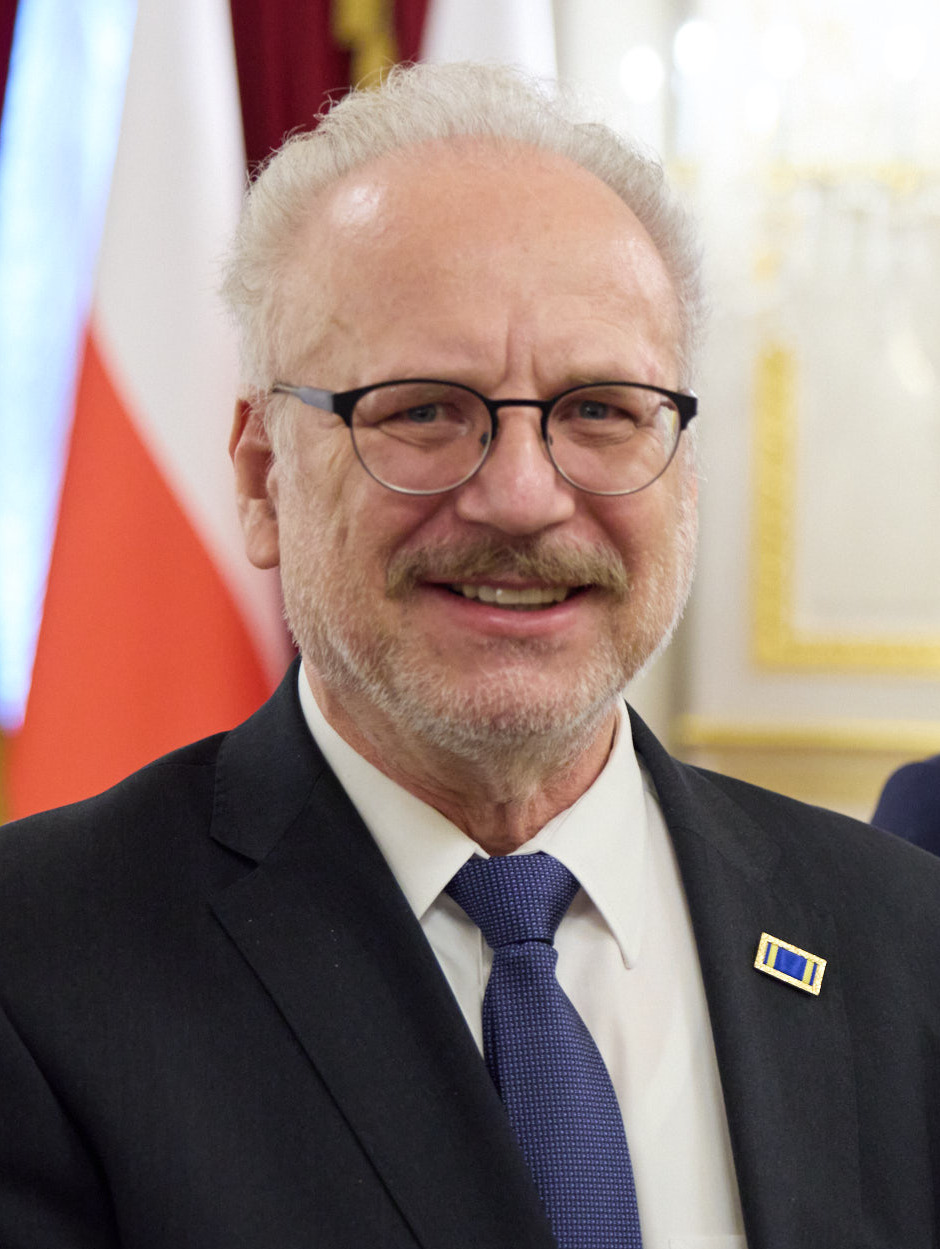
- Levits in 2023

10th President of Latvia
- In office 8 July 2019 – 8 July 2023
- Prime Minister: Krišjānis Kariņš
- Preceded by: Raimonds Vējonis
- Succeeded by: Edgars Rinkēvičs

Judge of the European Court of Justice
- In office 11 May 2004 – 17 June 2019
- Preceded by: Fidelma Macken
- Succeeded by: Niilo Jääskinen

Vice-Prime Minister of Latvia
- In office 3 August 1993 – 19 September 1994
- President: Guntis Ulmanis
- Prime Minister: Valdis Birkavs

Minister of Justice of Latvia
- In office 3 August 1993 – 19 September 1994
- President: Guntis Ulmanis
- Prime Minister: Valdis Birkavs
- Preceded by: Viktors Skudra
- Succeeded by: Romāns Apsītis

Member of Parliament
- In office 7 July 1993 – 5 October 1994

Personal details
- Born: 30 June 1955 (age 71) Riga, Latvian SSR, Soviet Union
- Party: Latvian Way (1993–1994)
- Spouse: Andra Levite (m. 1991)
- Children: 2
- Parent(s): Ingeborga Levita; Jonass Levits
- Education: University of Hamburg
- Occupation: Politician; Lawyer; Jurist

Egils Levits (born 30 June 1955) is a Latvian politician, lawyer, political scientist, and jurist who served as the tenth president of Latvia from 2019 to 2023. He was a member of the European Court of Justice from 2004 to 2019.

During the late Soviet-era, he was a member of the Popular Front of Latvia and contributed to the declaration of restored Latvian independence in 1990. He was vice-prime minister and minister for justice of Latvia from 1993 to 1994 and ambassador to Hungary, Austria and Switzerland from 1994 to 1995. He was then appointed a judge of the European Court of Human Rights, a position he held until 2004. He finished second in the indirect election for the president of Latvia in 2015, behind Raimonds Vējonis. Although an independent, he was the candidate of the National Alliance. In 2018, Levits was reappointed a judge of the European Court of Justice, having first been appointed in 2004. He is married and has two children: a son, Linards, and daughter, Indra. He published a book of memoirs in 2019.

He announced in early May 2023 that he would not run for reelection to the presidency and, on 31 May, Edgars Rinkēvičs was elected as his successor.

== Early life ==
Levits was born in Riga, into the family of Latvian Jewish engineer Jonass Levits and his mother, Latvian-Baltic German poet Ingeborga Levita (née Barga, pen name Aija Zemzare). In 1972, the family was expelled from the USSR for their Soviet dissident activities and settled in West Germany, where Ingeborga's relatives lived. They lived in West Germany until 1990 when Latvia regained its independence.

Levits has stated in interviews that despite being of Jewish and German heritage, he identifies foremost as Latvian, and called on Latvian citizens of non-Latvian origin to adopt a similar stance.

== Political career ==
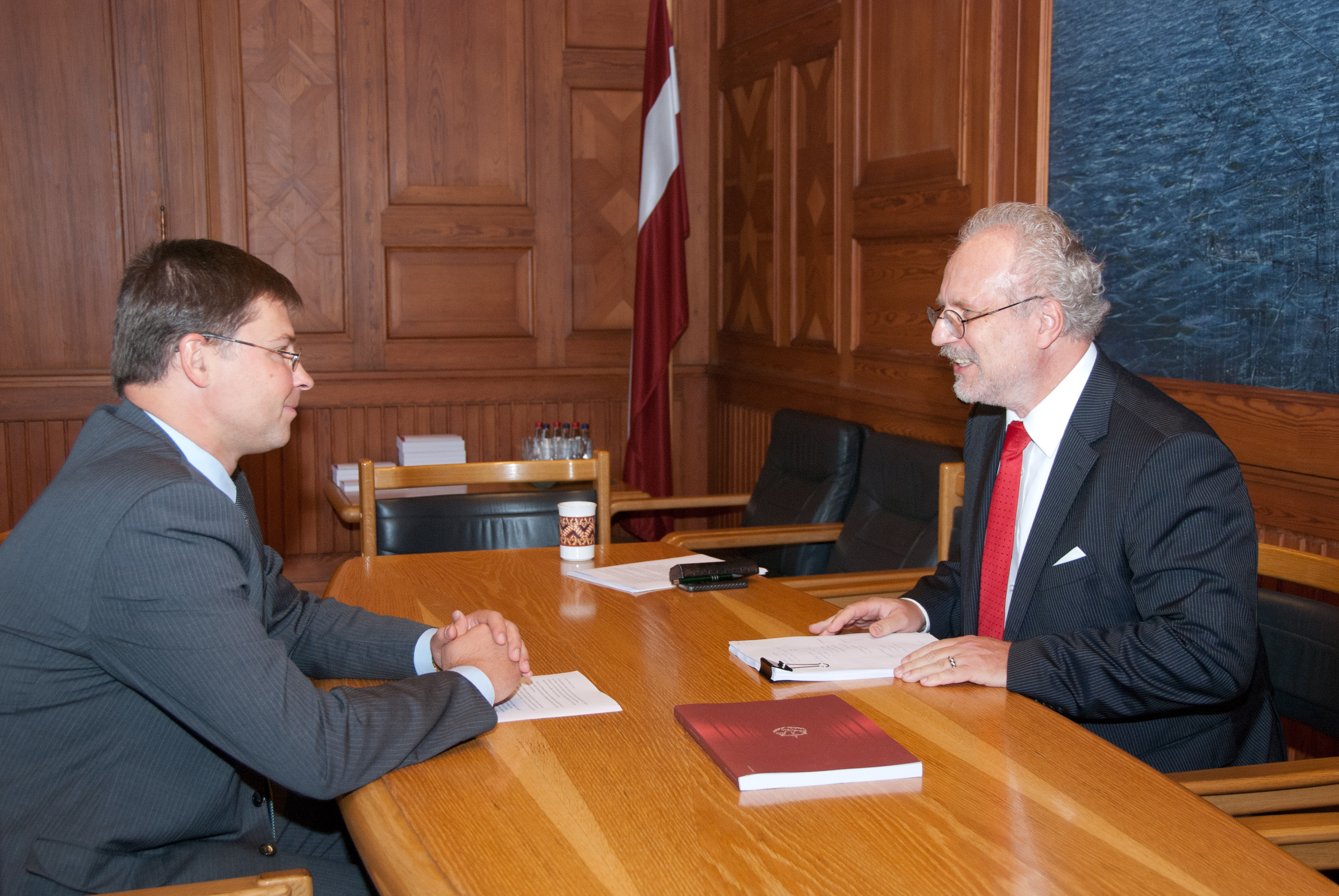
Levits meeting with the prime minister of Latvia Valdis Dombrovskis in 2012 as a judge of the Court of Justice of the European Union

Levits has been involved in Latvian politics since the late 1980s. Levits became a member of the Popular Front of Latvia and a member of the Latvian Citizens' Congress established in 1989. Later, he joined the political club "Klubs 21" and in 1993 was elected a 5th Saeima deputy from the list of the party Latvijas Ceļš. In 2016, he was among the best paid EU officials. In 2018, he was named the "European Person of the Year in Latvia" by the European Movement – Latvia.

He has been an ambassador of Latvia to Austria, Switzerland and Hungary.

He is the co-author of the preamble to the Constitution of Latvia and has been the head for Commission for Constitutional Law, working under the president together with lawyer Lauris Liepa.

=== Presidential campaigns ===
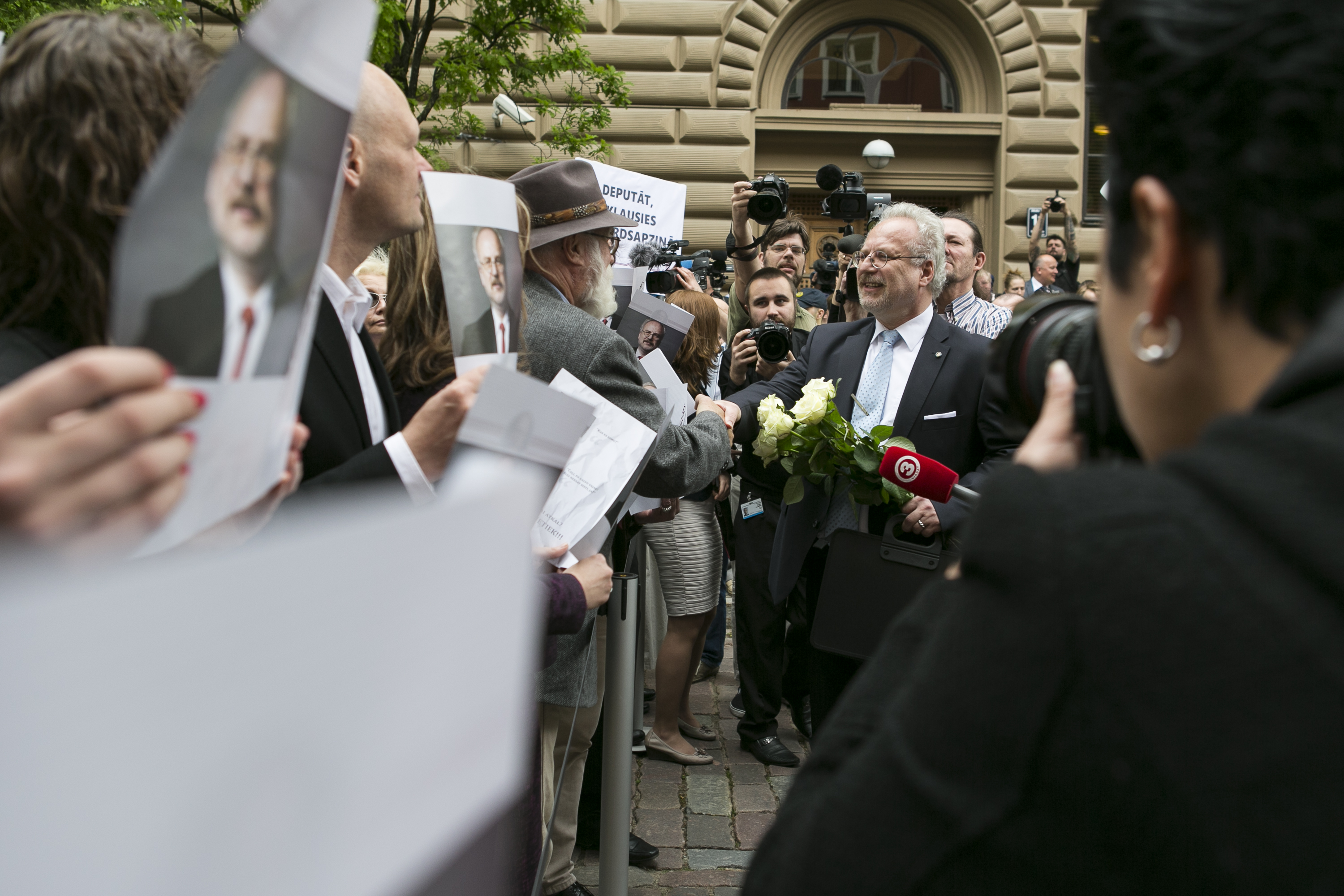
Levits meeting with his supporters outside the Saeima during the 2015 presidential elections

Levits was named a presidential candidate by the National Alliance party in 2011 and 2015, coming second in votes in the final round to the minister of defense Raimonds Vējonis in 2015. Levits was widely discussed as a potential frontrunner candidate for the presidency in early 2019, and on April 15 the parties of the ruling coalition announced that they would support Levits' candidacy. Latvia's parliament elected him on 29 May 2019.

=== Presidency ===
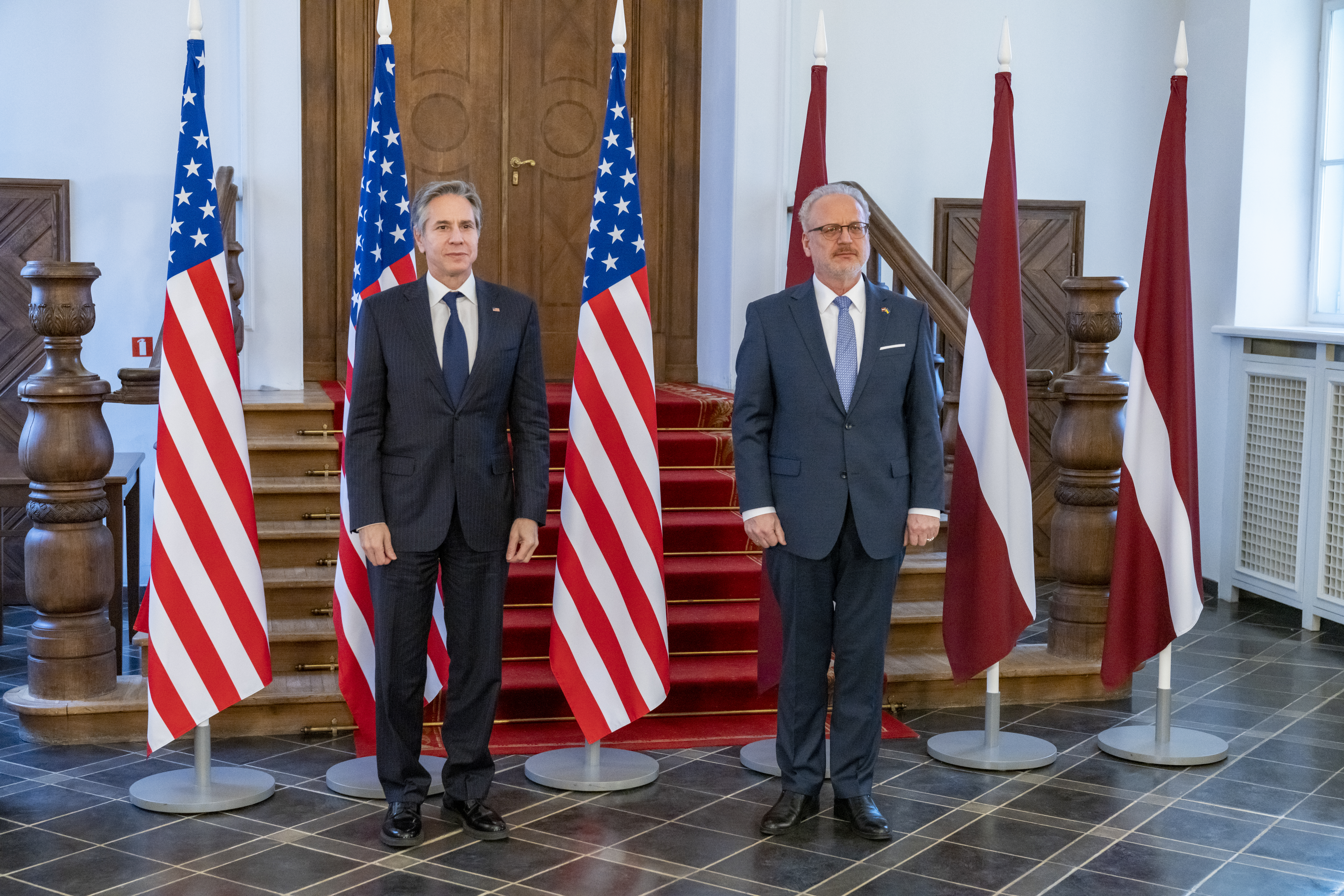
Levits with U.S. Secretary of State Antony Blinken during Blinken's visit to Latvia in 2022

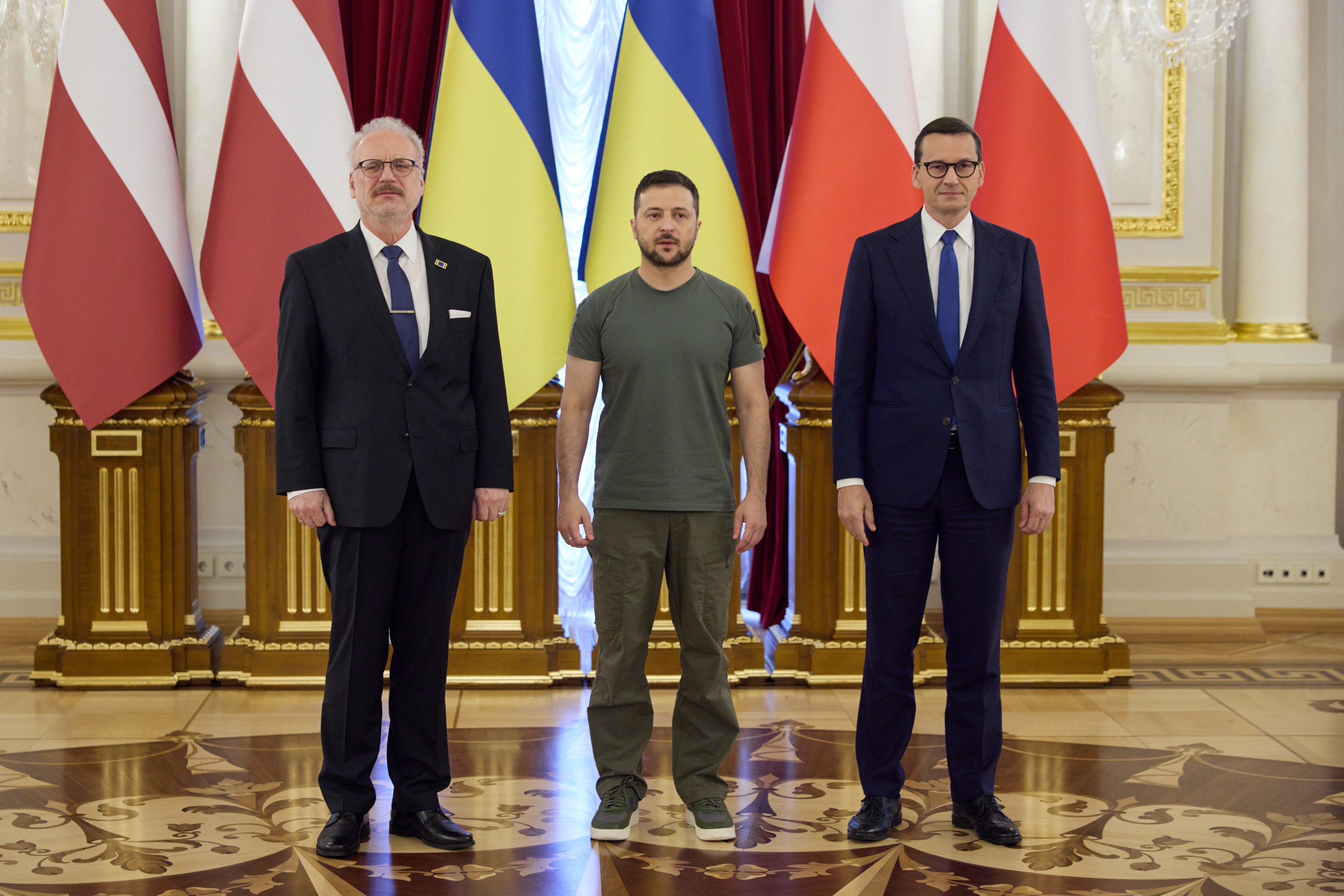
Levits meets with the Ukrainian President Volodymyr Zelenskyy and Polish Prime Minister Mateusz Morawiecki in Kyiv, 9 September 2022

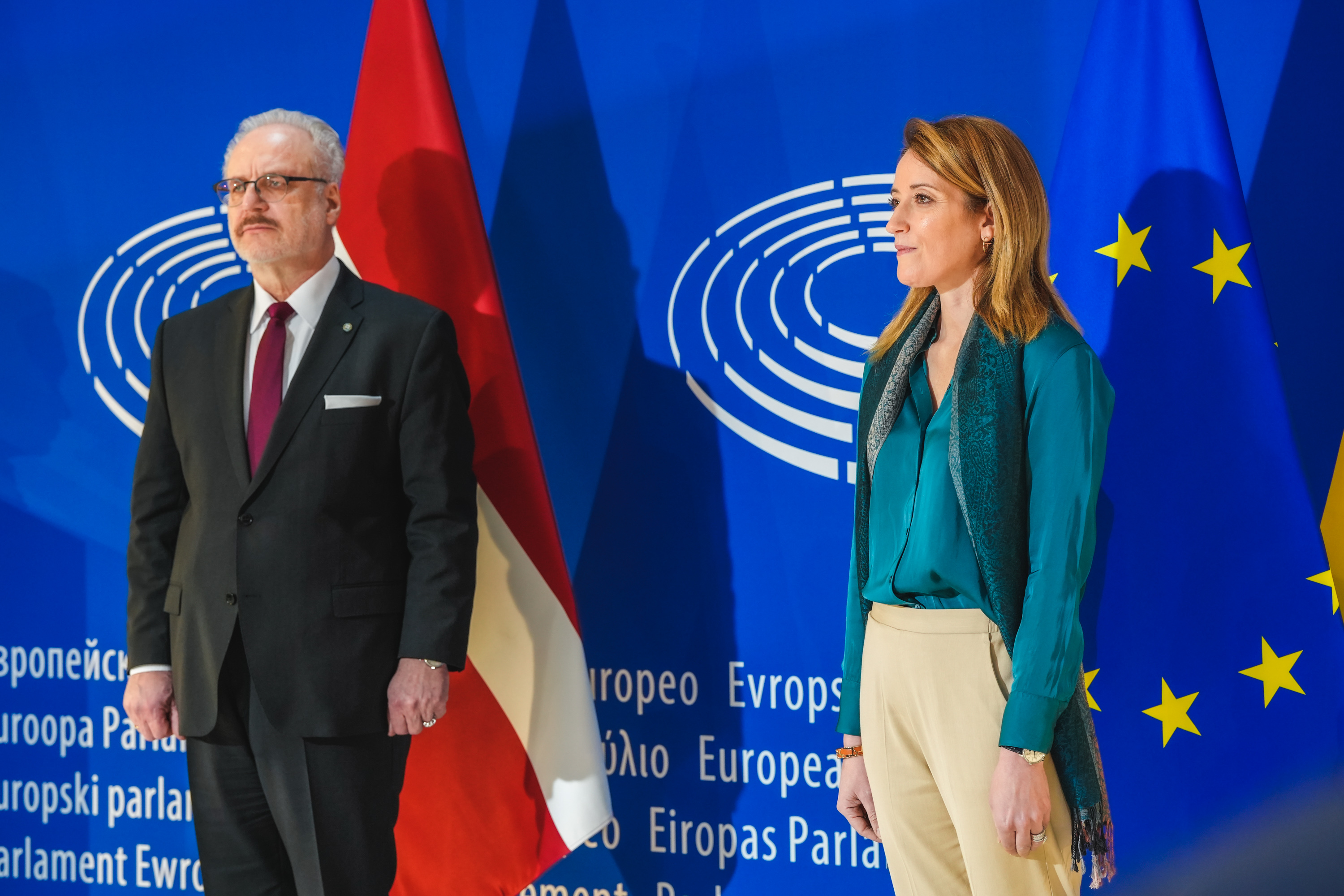
Levits meets with the President of the European Parliament Roberta Metsola in 2023

Levits was inaugurated in the Saeima on 8 July 2019. During his inaugural speech, he noted that "there is no ideal country, because that implies halted progress." After the ceremony, he visited the Freedom Monument, laid flowers at the grave of Jānis Čakste, and received the keys to Riga Castle from outgoing president Raimonds Vējonis. On July 10, he conducted his first foreign visit to Tallinn, Estonia, meeting with President Kersti Kaljulaid and Prime Minister Jüri Ratas.

In August 2021, Levits made an official visit to Sweden, meeting King Carl XVI Gustaf to mark the centenary of diplomatic relations and the 30th anniversary of Latvian independence.

In September 2021, Levits was accused of putting inappropriate pressure on members of the Development/For! party alliance to nominate his legal advisor Irēna Kucina to a position on the Constitutional Court. Levits admitted that a phone call with those party members had taken place, but denied making any threats and called the controversy a "misunderstanding".

According to the data of the public opinion research firm SKDS, in March 2023, 27% of Latvian citizens rated Egils Levits activity positively, and 64% negatively. On 10 May 2023, it became known that President Levits will not run in the 2023 Latvian presidential election on 31 May, although he previously announced his readiness to run for a second term.

== Judicial career ==
In 1995, Levits was elected representative of Latvia for European Court of Human Rights. Since 2004, he has been Latvia's representative to the European Court of Justice, where the mandate will expire in 2024.

== Political views ==
Levits has expressed traditionally conservative views on issues in Latvian politics. During his time as a European judge, he has been involved in and commented on current developments in Latvia; for example, he said that neither the reception of refugees nor the Istanbul Convention violate the Constitution of Latvia. Levits has expressed scepticism about enacting major change to the financial system, calling Latvia one of the strongest economies in Europe.

Levits has also supported many initiatives to reduce the use of Russian language in Latvia, including promulgating amendments banning private universities to employ instruction in languages other than the official languages of the European Union, and reaffirmed that Latvian non-citizens (even Latvian-born) must first pass a Latvian literacy test to receive citizenship. Levits is not a member of any political party, and has expressed a wish to remain independent.

== In popular culture ==
On the 7 December 2019 episode of Saturday Night Live, Levits was portrayed by Alex Moffat, in a sketch that poked fun at Donald Trump's experience at the 2019 NATO summit.

== Personal life ==
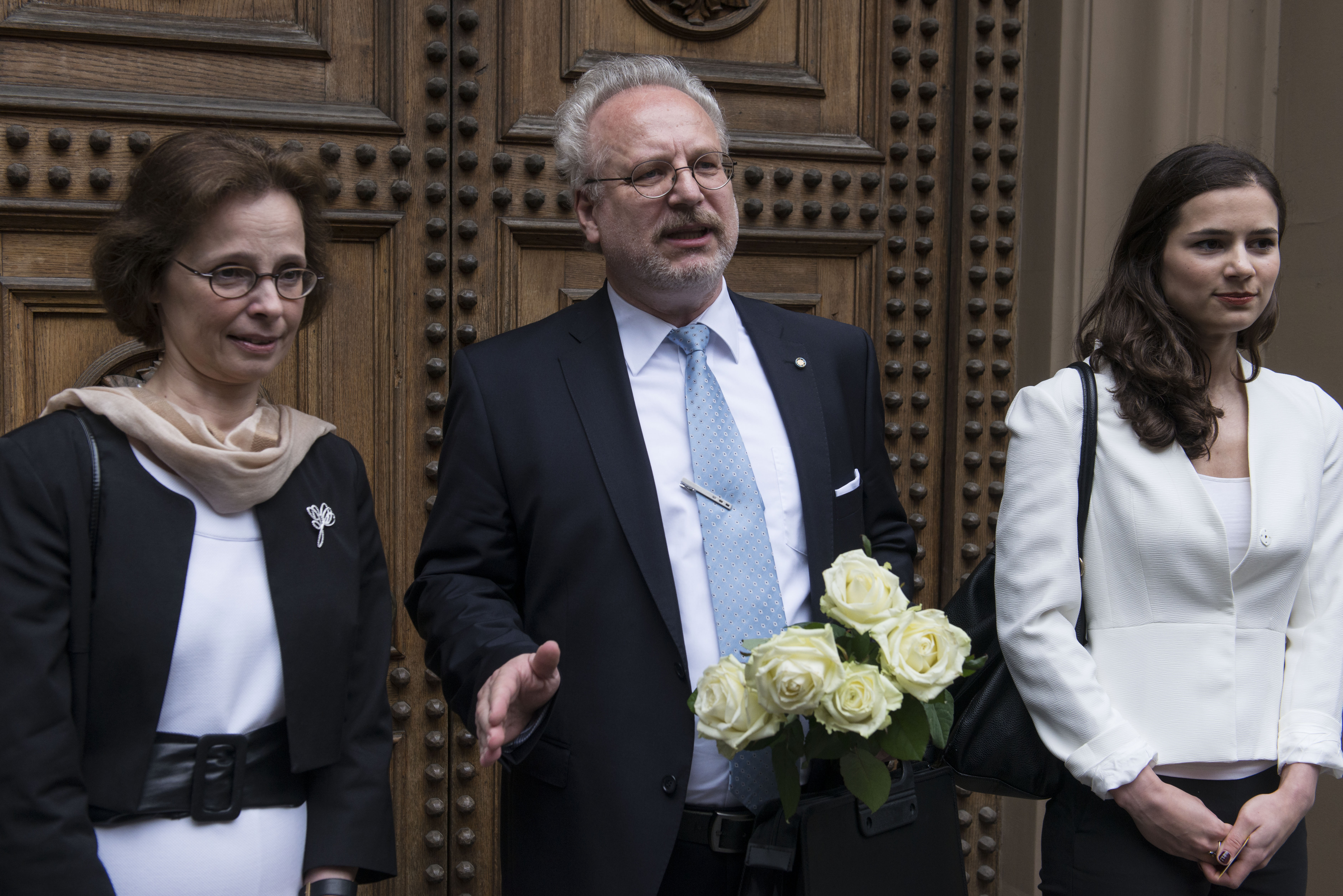
Egils Levits with his wife Andra (left) and daughter Indra (right)

Levits is married to Andra Levite, a gynecologist, and has a son named Linards and a daughter named Indra. In 2019, Levits released his first book Valstsgriba. Idejas un domas Latvijai 1985–2018 (Country's Will: Ideas and thoughts for Latvia 1985–2018) where he mentions articles, interviews and combines them with his personal opinion as a Judge at the Court of Justice of the European Union. Aside from his native Latvian language, he also knows German (from his time in Germany), English, French and Russian.

== Honours ==
=== National ===
- Latvia: Grand Master and Commander Grand Cross with Chain of the Order of the Three Stars (8 July 2019)
- Latvia: Grand Master and Grand Cross of the Order of Viesturs (8 July 2019)
- Latvia: Grand Master of the Cross of Recognition (8 July 2019)

=== Foreign ===
- Estonia: Collar of the Order of the Cross of Terra Mariana (19 April 2023)
- Ukraine: Order of Prince Yaroslav the Wise, 1st class (23 August 2021)
- Luxembourg: Grand Cross of the Order of the Gold Lion of the House of Nassau (13 March 2023)
- Portugal: Grand Collar of the Order of Prince Henry (12 April 2023)
- Poland: Knight of the Order of the White Eagle (26 January 2023)

== Publications ==
- Levits, Egils (2019). Valstsgriba. Idejas un domas Latvijai 1985–2018 [A Will for Statehood: Ideas and thoughts for Latvia 1985–2018]. Riga. ISBN 9789984840567.
- Levits, Egils; Roses, Allan; Bot, Yves (2012). The Court of Justice and the Construction of Europe: Analyses and Perspectives on Sixty Years of Case-law (in English and French). Springer Science & Business Media. ISBN 978-9067048972.
- Verfassungsgerichtsbarkeit in Lettland. Osteuropa-Recht: Gegenwartsfragen aus dem sowjetischen Rechtskreis Osteuropa-Recht, Vol. 43, No. 4, p. 305-328, Vol. 43, No. 4, p. 305-328, 1997.
- Der zweite Weltkrieg und sein Ende in Lettland. Lüneburg: Institut Nordostdeutsches Kulturwerk, 1996.
- Die Wirtschaft der baltischen Staaten im Umbruch. Köln: Wissenschaft und Politik, 1992. (with Boris Meissner; Dietrich A Loeber; Paulis Apinis and others)
- Lettland unter sowjetischer Herrschaft: die politische Entwicklung 1940-1989. Köln: Markus Verlag, 1990
- Sowjetunion heute: Glasnost und Peristroika; Grundinformation. [Kiel]: 1989
- Die baltischen Staaten: Estland — Lettland — Litauen. Bonn: Bundeszentrale für politische Bildung, 1989. (with Hildegard Bremer) (in German)
- Der politische Konflikt zwischen den Selbstbestimmungsbestrebungen und dem sowjetischen Herrschaftsanspruch in Lettland: eine regionale Fallstudie zur sowjetischen Nationalitätenpolitik. Marburg an d. Lahn: Johann-Gottfried-Herder-Institut, 1988.
- Die baltische Frage im Europäischen Parlament. 1983. Bd. 22. S.9-37
- Die demographische Situation in der UdSSR und in den baltischen Staaten unter besonderer Berücksichtigung von nationalen und sprachsoziologischen Aspekten. 1981.

Political offices
Preceded by Viktors Skudra	Minister of Justice; 1993–1994	Succeeded by Romāns Apsītis
Preceded by Raimonds Vējonis	President of Latvia; 2019–2023	Succeeded by Edgars Rinkēvičs
