= First ladies and gentlemen of Lithuania =

Spouses of the presidents of Lithuania

First Lady of Lithuania
- Pirmoji Lietuvos ponia
- Presidential Standard
- Incumbent; Diana Nepaitė since 12 July 2019
- Residence: Presidential Palace, Vilnius
- Inaugural holder: Sofija Smetonienė
- Formation: 4 April 1919

First Lady or First Gentleman of Lithuania is the title attributed to the spouse of the president of Lithuania. The current first lady of Lithuania is Diana Nepaitė, wife of President Gitanas Nausėda. To date, there has been no official first gentleman of Lithuania. The country's first female president, Dalia Grybauskaitė, who held the office from 2009 to 2019, was unmarried during her presidency.

== List of first ladies of Lithuania ==
No.	Portrait	Name	Tenure	Age at tenure start	President (Spouse, unless noted)
1	Portrait of Martha Washington	Sofija Smetonienė; 13 January 1885 – 28 December 1968 (aged 83)	4 April 1919 – 19 June 1920	34 years	Antanas Smetona m. 14 August 1904
2	Portrait of Martha Washington	Ona Stulginskienė; 22 November 1894 – 18 July 1962 (aged 68)	19 June 1920 – 7 June 1926	26 years	Aleksandras Stulginskis m. 24 April 1920
—	Vacant		7 June 1926 – 17 December 1926	Vacant	Kazys Grinius; Widower
(1)	Portrait of Martha Washington	Sofija Smetonienė; 13 January 1885 – 28 December 1968 (aged 83)	19 December 1926 – 15 June 1940	41 years	Antanas Smetona m. 14 August 1904
3	Portrait of Martha Washington	Julija Brazauskienė; 1932 – 16 April 2011 (aged 79)	25 November 1992 – 24 December 1998	60 years	Algirdas Mykolas Brazauskas m. 1958
4	Portrait engraving of Louisa Adams	Alma Adamkienė; 10 February 1927 – 21 May 2023 (aged 96)	26 February 1998 – 26 February 2003	71 years	Valdas Adamkus m. 1951
5	Portrait of Martha Washington	Laima Paksienė; Born 20 March 1961 (aged 62)	26 February 2003 – 6 April 2004	42 years	Rolandas Paksas m. 1990
(4)	Portrait engraving of Louisa Adams	Alma Adamkienė; 10 February 1927 – 21 May 2023 (aged 96)	12 July 2004 – 12 July 2009	71 years	Valdas Adamkus m. 1951
—	Vacant		12 July 2009 – 12 July 2019	Vacant	Dalia Grybauskaitė; Unmarried
6		Diana Nausėdienė Born 9 July 1964 (aged 59)	12 July 2019 – Present	55 years	Gitanas Nausėda m. 1990
