= Alma Adamkienė =

Former First Lady of Lithuania

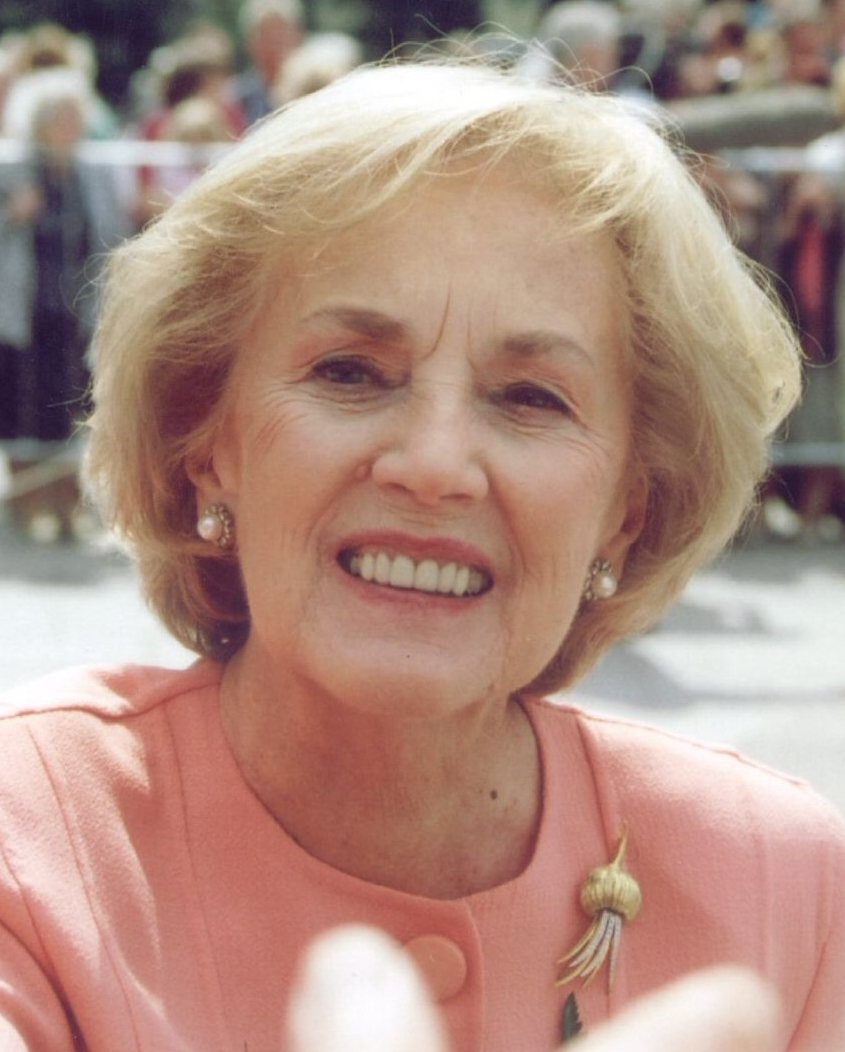

First Lady of Lithuania
- In role 26 February 1998 – 26 February 2003
- President: Valdas Adamkus
- Preceded by: Julija Brazauskienė
- Succeeded by: Laima Paksienė
- In role 12 July 2004 – 12 July 2009
- President: Valdas Adamkus
- Preceded by: Laima Paksienė
- Succeeded by: Diana Nausėdienė (2019)

Personal details
- Born: Alma Nutautaitė; 10 February 1927 Šiauliai, Lithuania
- Died: 21 May 2023 (aged 96) Vilnius, Lithuania
- Spouse: Valdas Adamkus (m. 1951)
- Education: Friedrich-Alexander-University, Erlangen-Nuremberg
- Profession: Philology

Alma Adamkienė (née Nutautaitė; 10 February 1927 – 21 May 2023) was a Lithuanian philologist and philanthropist. She was the wife of the president of Lithuania, Valdas Adamkus, and was First Lady during his two terms (1998–2003 and 2004–2009). She also held United States citizenship.

== Early life ==
Adamkienė was born in Šiauliai on 10 February 1927. Her father, Stasys Nutautas, was a businessman; her mother, Ona Soblytė-Nutautienė, assisted her husband in various commercial activities. In 1944, when the Soviet Army returned to Lithuania, Alma Nutautaitė fled with her family to Germany. She finished high school in Germany, and later studied Philology at Erlangen University in Nuremberg.

== Life in the United States ==
Alma Nutautaitė emigrated to the United States in 1949. She first worked as a laboratory assistant at a steel factory. Later, she took a position with an insurance company. She also organized and participated in Lithuanian émigré activities. Nutautaitė married Valdas Adamkus in 1951, and took her husband's surname (she was known as Alma Adamkus in the United States).

== First Lady ==
During the presidential election held in Lithuania in 1997, Valdas Adamkus campaigned for the presidency and won. After Adamkus became president, Adamkienė became involved in various Lithuanian social programs focusing on the welfare of children. She opened a foundation, the Alma Adamkienė Charity and Support Fund, in 1999.

== Personal life and death ==
Adamkienė had no children. She died from a stroke in Vilnius, on 21 May 2023, at the age of 96.

== Honours ==
1998 : Member 1st Class of the Order of Prince Yaroslav the Wise

2001 : Grand Cross of the Order of the Three Stars

2004 : Member 1st Class of the Order of the White Star

2006 : Grand Cross in the Order of the Crown.

2007 : Grand Cross of the Order of Prince Henry

2009 : Grand Officer of the Order of Merit of the Republic of Poland

Honorary titles
| Preceded by Julija Brazauskienė | First Lady of Lithuania; 1998–2003 | Succeeded by Laima Paksienė |
| Preceded by Laima Paksienė | First Lady of Lithuania; 2004–2009 | Vacant Title next held by Diana Nausėdienė |
