= Erkki Keldo =

Estonian politician

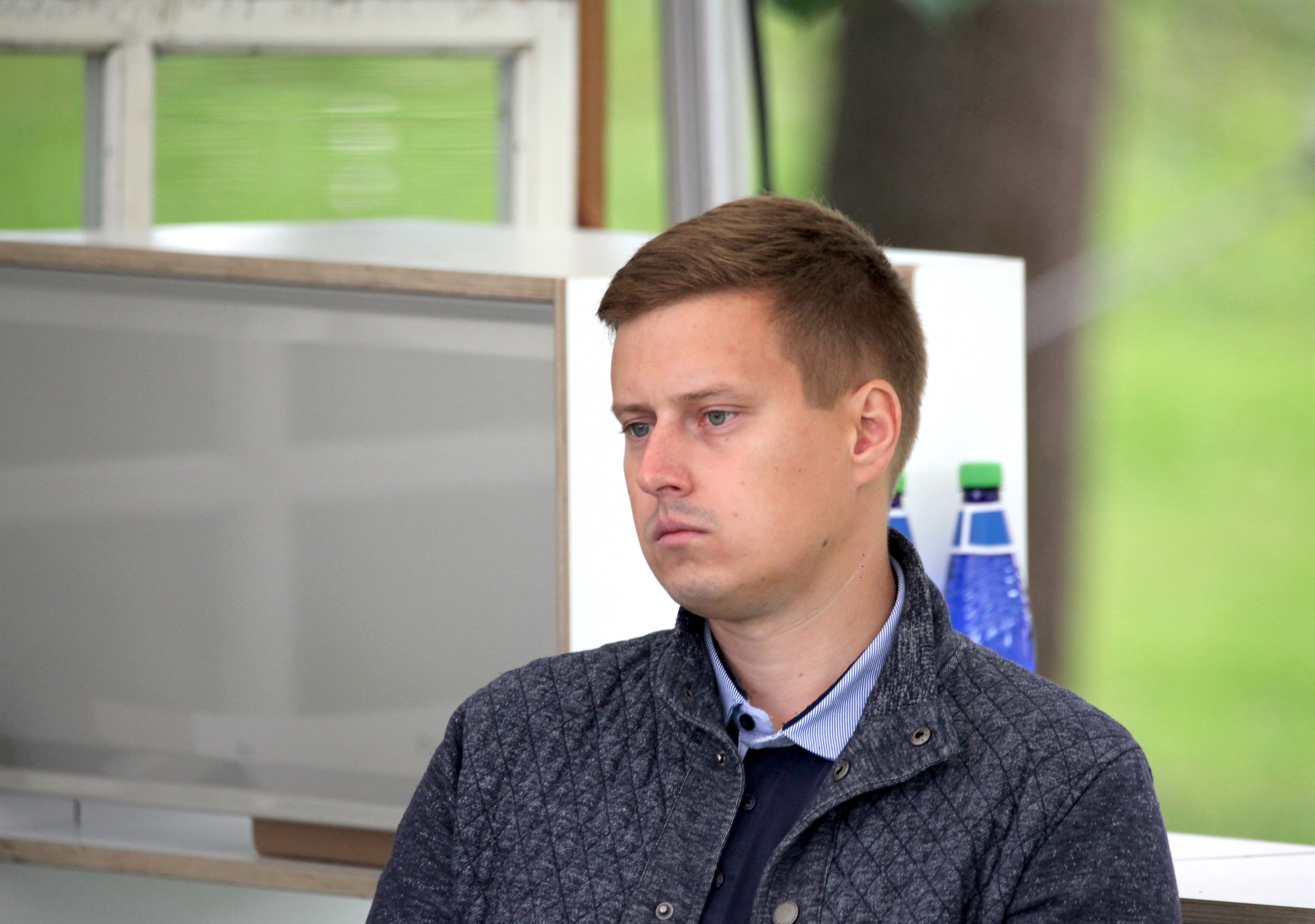
Keldo in 2021

Erkki Keldo (born 7 November 1990) is an Estonian politician. He has been member of the XIV Riigikogu and XV Riigikogu.

In 2013 he graduated from Tallinn University with a degree in government and administration. In 2014 he graduated from the Tallinn University of Technology with a degree in economics.

Since 2018 he is Secretary General of Estonian Reform Party. He has been a member of Estonian Reform Party since 2012.
