= Tiit Riisalo =

Estonian politician (born 1967)

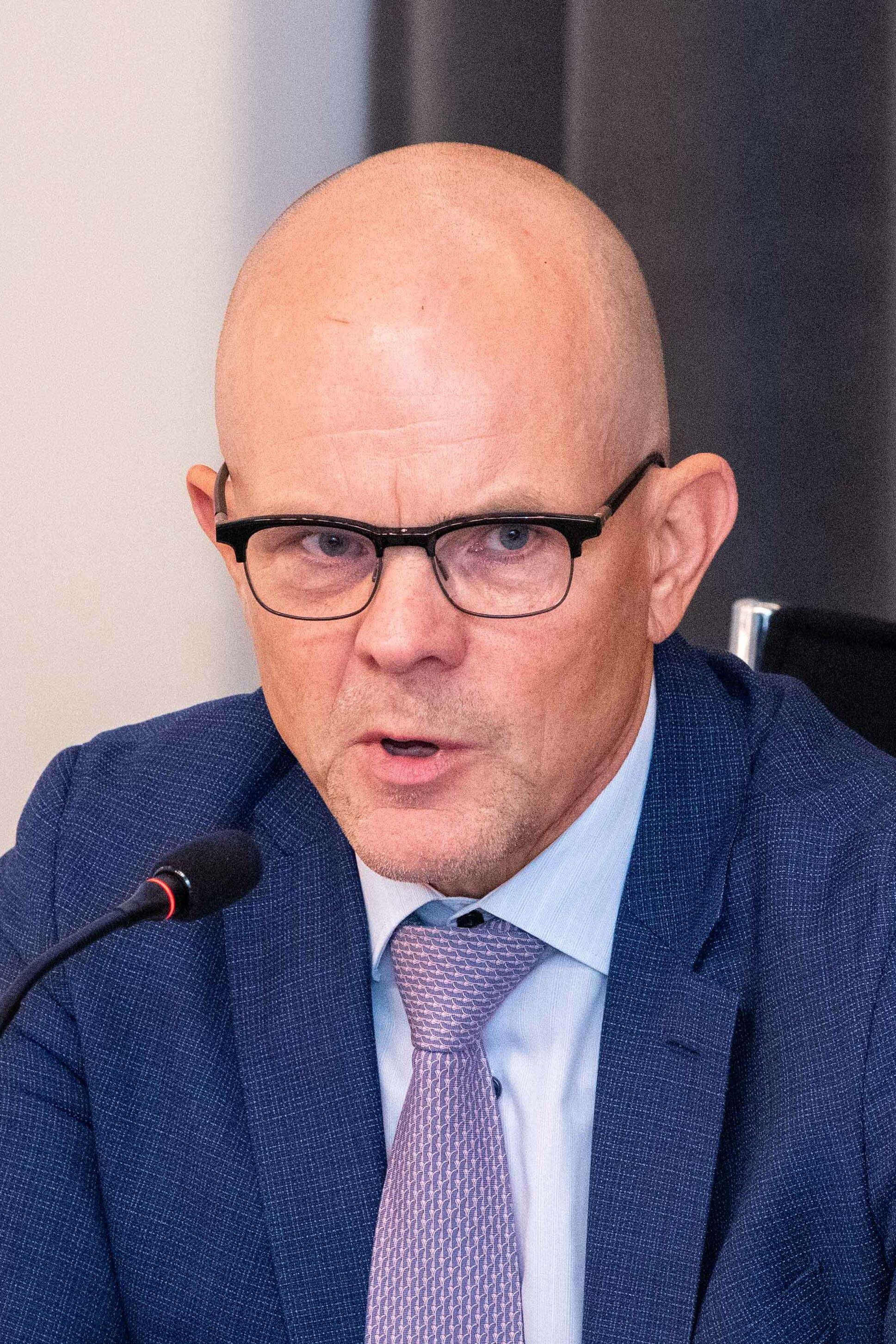
- Riisalo in 2023

Minister of Economic Affairs and Information Technology
- In office 17 April 2023 – 23 July 2024
- Prime Minister: Kaja Kallas
- Preceded by: Riina Sikkut
- Succeeded by: Erkki Keldo

Director of the Office of the President of the Republic
- In office October 2016 – October 2021
- President: Kersti Kaljulaid
- Preceded by: Alo Heinsalo
- Succeeded by: Krista Zibo

Personal details
- Born: 17 February 1967 (age 59) Tallinn, Estonia
- Party: Estonia 200

Tiit Riisalo (born 17 February 1967) is an Estonian politician. From 17 April 2023 to 23 July 2024, he was the Minister of Economic Affairs and Information Technology. in Kaja Kallas's third cabinet.

He is a member of the party Estonia 200.
