= Diana Nausėdienė =

Lithuanian business manager and lecturer

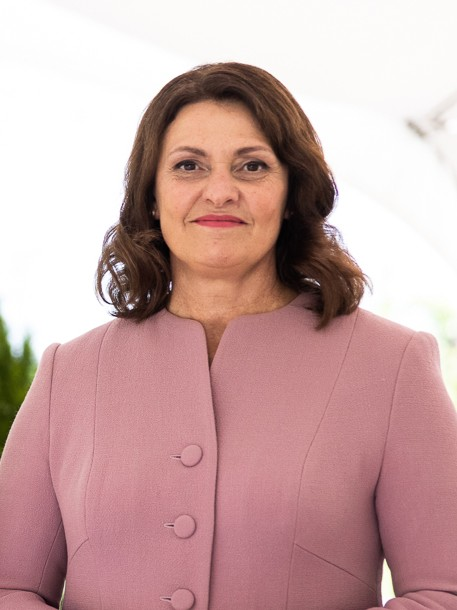
- Nausėdienė in 2022

First Lady of Lithuania
- Current
- Assumed role 12 July 2019
- President: Gitanas Nausėda
- Preceded by: Alma Adamkienė (2009)

Personal details
- Born: Diana Nepaitė; 9 July 1964 (age 62) Klaipėda, then part of Lithuanian SSR, Soviet Union
- Spouse: Gitanas Nausėda (m. 1990)
- Children: 2
- Education: Kaunas Polytechnic Institute

Diana Nausėdienė (née Nepaitė; born 9 July 1964) is a Lithuanian business manager and lecturer, who has served as the First Lady of Lithuania since 12 July 2019 as the wife of Gitanas Nausėda, President of Lithuania.

== Early life ==
Nausėdienė was born in Klaipėda, Lithuania, where she was brought up in a traditional Lithuanian household. Nausėdienė's father was the captain of a long distance fishing boat and her mother was an accountant. She has a sister who is three years her elder.

== Career and education ==
In 1987, Nausėdienė graduated from the Kaunas Polytechnic Institute Faculty of Light Industry (now Kaunas University of Technology). After graduation, Nausėdienė worked for H&M Hennes & Mauritz GBC AB where she performed quality management and standards maintenance, before becoming a lecturer at the Vilnius University International Business School.

Speaking at an event on women's leadership in September 2020, Nausėdienė caused controversy when she argued that increasing the share of women in any given field did not automatically lead to better outcomes, giving education as an example. Commentators accused Nausėdienė of blaming women for the ills in Lithuania's education system, saying she had completely missed the root of the problem.

== Honours ==
=== Foreign honours ===
- Belgium: Grand Cross of the Order of the Crown (24 October 2022)
- Denmark: Grand Cross of the Order of the Dannebrog (28 January 2026)
- Poland: Grand Cross of the Order of Polonia Restituta (5 July 2023)
- Finland: Commander Grand Cross of the Order of the White Rose of Finland (14 May 2026)

Honorary titles
| Vacant Title last held by Alma Adamkienė | First Lady of Lithuania; 2019–present | Current holder |
