= List of the busiest airports in the Baltic states =

Location of the Baltic states (dark green) in Europe (dark grey)

This is a list of the busiest airports in the Baltic states in terms of total number of passengers, aircraft movements and freight and mail tonnes per year. The statistics includes major airports in the Baltic States with commercial regular traffic. "Aircraft movements" and "freight and mail tonnes" only include statistics for the five busiest airports in 2012, since reliable data is not available for all airports. Included are also a list of the busiest air routes to/from and between the Baltic states for 2011 and 2012; data for 2019 will be added as soon as the data becomes available.

== Passengers ==
=== International airports ===
The table lists airports with current or past regular international flights.

| Rank | Country | Airport | 2025 | 2024 | 2023 | 2022 | 2021 | 2020 | 2019 | 2018 | 2017 | 2016 | 2015 | 2014 | 2013 | 2012 | 2011 | 2010 | 2009 | 2008 | 2007 | 2006 | 2005 | 2004 |
|---|---|---|---|---|---|---|---|---|---|---|---|---|---|---|---|---|---|---|---|---|---|---|---|---|
| 1. | Latvia | Riga International Airport | 7,111,000 | 7,120,000 | 6,630,891 | 5,380,779 | 2,353,064 | 2,011,155 | 7,798,394 | 7,056,089 | 6,097,434 | 5,402,545 | 5,162,675 | 4,814,073 | 4,793,213 | 4,767,764 | 5,106,692 | 4,663,647 | 4,066,854 | 3,690,549 | 3,160,945 | 2,495,020 | 1,878,035 | 1,060,426 |
| 2. | Lithuania | Vilnius Čiurlionis International Airport | 5,113,452 | 4,803,725 | 4,406,019 | 3,915,960 | 1,898,817 | 1,312,468 | 5,004,921 | 4,922,949 | 3,761,837 | 3,814,001 | 3,336,084 | 2,942,670 | 2,661,869 | 2,208,096 | 1,712,467 | 1,373,859 | 1,308,632 | 2,048,439 | 1,717,222 | 1,451,468 | 1,281,872 | 964,164 |
| 3. | Estonia | Lennart Meri Tallinn Airport | 3,488,104 | 3,491,799 | 2,961,569 | 2,748,255 | 1,301,109 | 863,588 | 3,267,909 | 3,007,644 | 2,648,361 | 2,203,536 | 2,166,663 | 2,017,291 | 1,958,801 | 2,206,791 | 1,913,172 | 1,384,831 | 1,346,236 | 1,811,536 | 1,728,430 | 1,541,832 | 1,401,059 | 997,941 |
| 4. | Lithuania | Kaunas International Airport | 1,600,000 | 1,427,284 | 1,300,424 | 1,159,184 | 487,532 | 368,645 | 1,160,591 | 1,011,067 | 1,186,081 | 740,448 | 747,284 | 724,314 | 695,509 | 830,268 | 872,618 | 809,732 | 456,698 | 410,165 | 390,881 | 248,228 | 77,350 | 27,113 |
| 5. | Lithuania | Palanga International Airport | 448,400 | 377,615 | 307,090 | 274,879 | 85,895 | 123,948 | 338,309 | 316,643 | 297,197 | 232,630 | 145,441 | 132,931 | 127,890 | 128,169 | 111,133 | 102,528 | 104,600 | 101,586 | 93,379 | 110,828 | 94,000 | 76,020 |
| 6. | Estonia | Tartu Airport | 44,489 | 27,270 | 1,080 | 8,653 | 497 | 5,869 | 28,322 | 26,092 | 30,296 | 29,594 | 21,117 | 14,493 | 13,690 | 20,302 | 18,583 | 23,504 | 9,707 | 826 | 1,182 | 1,638 | 902 | 1,268 |
| 7. | Estonia | Kuressaare Airport | 34,776 | 42,490 | 42,232 | 38,749 | 29,447 | 16,858 | 24,614 | 23,166 | 19,231 | 13,289 | 14,458 | 13,665 | 13,163 | 11,421 | 17,822 | 19,702 | 19,519 | 23,752 | 20,026 | 18,341 | 18,071 | 15,091 |

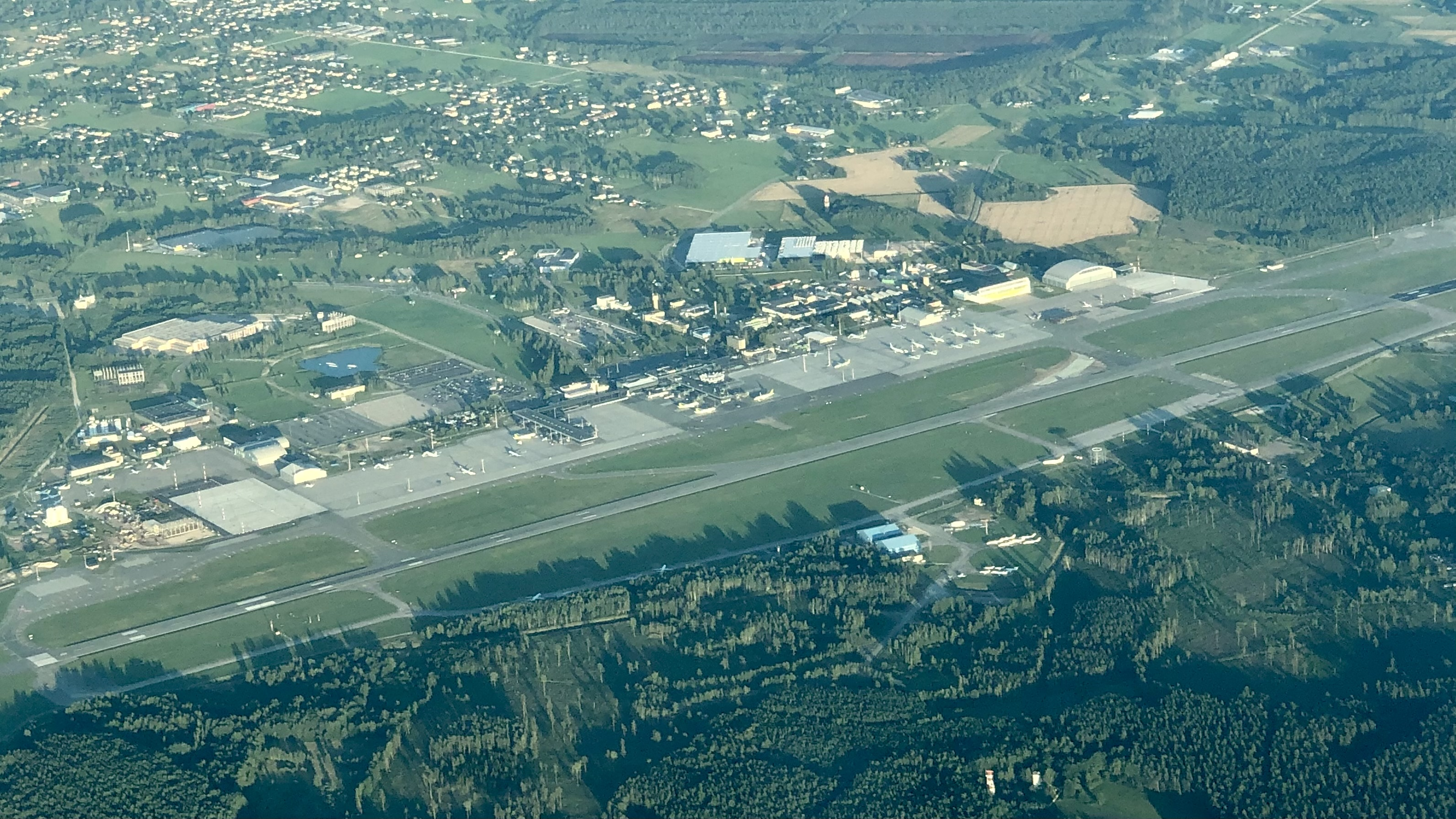
Aerial view of the Riga International Airport

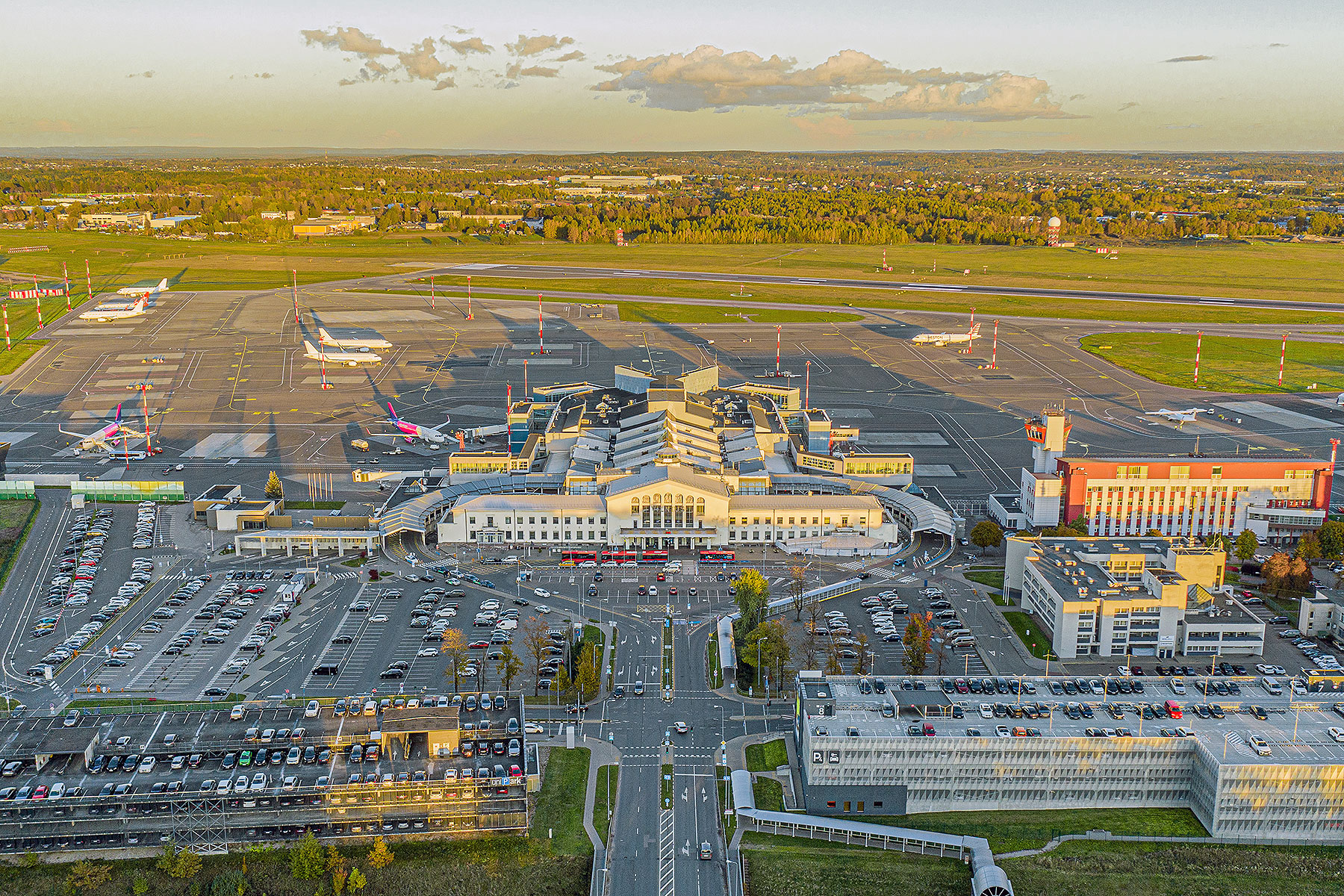
Aerial view of the Vilnius Čiurlionis International Airport

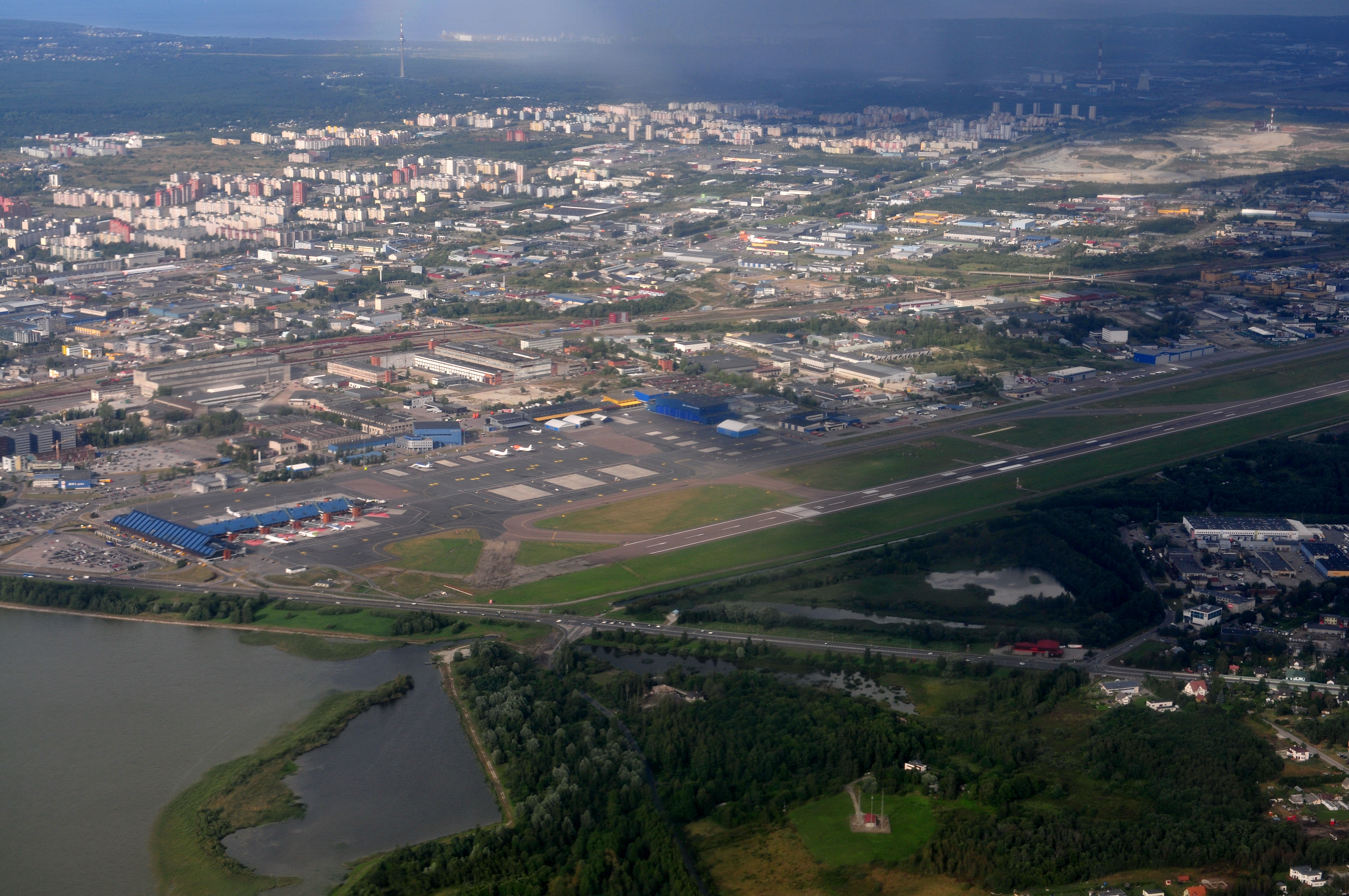
Aerial view of the Tallinn International Airport

=== Annual statistics ===
==== 2025 statistics ====
| Rank | Country | City | Airport | Code (IATA/ICAO) | Passengers (2025) | Change 2024–2025 |
|---|---|---|---|---|---|---|
| 1. | Latvia | Riga | Riga International Airport | RIX/EVRA | 7,111,000 | ▼0.1% |
| 2. | Lithuania | Vilnius | Vilnius Airport | VNO/EYVI | 5,113,452 | ▲7.0% |
| 3. | Estonia | Tallinn | Lennart Meri Tallinn Airport | TLL/EETN | 3,488,104 | ▼0.1% |
| 4. | Lithuania | Kaunas | Kaunas International Airport | KUN/EYKA | 1,600,000 | ▲12.1% |
| 5. | Lithuania | Palanga | Palanga International Airport | PLQ/EYPA | 448,400 | ▲18.7% |
| 6. | Estonia | Tartu | Tartu Airport | TAY/EETU | 44,489 | ▲63,14% |
| 7. | Estonia | Kuressaare | Kuressaare Airport | URE/EEKE | 34,776 | ▼18.2% |
| 8. | Estonia | Kärdla | Kärdla Airport | KDL/EEKA | 11,909 | ▼22.2% |
| 9. | Estonia | Ruhnu village | Ruhnu Airfield | –/EERU | 1,410 | ▼4.2% |
| 10. | Estonia | Pärnu | Pärnu Airport | EPU/EEPU | 932 | ▼15.0% |
| 11. | Latvia | Liepāja | Liepāja International Airport | LPX/EVLA | ? | New entry |
| 12. | Lithuania | Šiauliai | Šiauliai International Airport | SQQ/EYSA | ? | ▼ % |

==== 2024 statistics ====
| Rank | Country | City | Airport | Code (IATA/ICAO) | Passengers (2024) | Change 2023–2024 |
|---|---|---|---|---|---|---|
| 1. | Latvia | Riga | Riga International Airport | RIX/EVRA | 7,120,000 | ▲7.0% |
| 2. | Lithuania | Vilnius | Vilnius Airport | VNO/EYVI | 4,803,725 | ▲9.0% |
| 3. | Estonia | Tallinn | Lennart Meri Tallinn Airport | TLL/EETN | 3,492,114 | ▲17.9% |
| 4. | Lithuania | Kaunas | Kaunas International Airport | KUN/EYKA | 1,427,284 | ▲9.8% |
| 5. | Lithuania | Palanga | Palanga International Airport | PLQ/EYPA | 377,615 | ▲23.0% |
| 6. | Estonia | Kuressaare | Kuressaare Airport | URE/EEKE | 42,490 | ▲0.6% |
| 7. | Estonia | Tartu | Tartu Airport | TAY/EETU | 27,270 | ▲2,425% |
| 8. | Estonia | Kärdla | Kärdla Airport | KDL/EEKA | 15,307 | ▼5.2% |
| 9. | Estonia | Pärnu | Pärnu Airport | EPU/EEPU | 1,097 | ▼47.4% |
| 10. | Estonia | Ruhnu village | Ruhnu Airfield | –/EERU | 1,472 | ▲5.3% |
| 11. | Latvia | Liepāja | Liepāja International Airport | LPX/EVLA | 679 | New entry |
| 12. | Lithuania | Šiauliai | Šiauliai International Airport | SQQ/EYSA | 121 | ▼83.5% |

==== 2023 statistics ====
| Rank | Country | City | Airport | Code (IATA/ICAO) | Passengers (2023) | Change 2022–2023 |
|---|---|---|---|---|---|---|
| 1. | Latvia | Riga | Riga International Airport | RIX/EVRA | 6,630,891 | ▲23.2% |
| 2. | Lithuania | Vilnius | Vilnius Airport | VNO/EYVI | 4,406,019 | ▲12.5% |
| 3. | Estonia | Tallinn | Lennart Meri Tallinn Airport | TLL/EETN | 2,961,564 | ▲7.8% |
| 4. | Lithuania | Kaunas | Kaunas International Airport | KUN/EYKA | 1,300,424 | ▲12.2% |
| 5. | Lithuania | Palanga | Palanga International Airport | PLQ/EYPA | 307,090 | ▲11.7% |
| 6. | Estonia | Kuressaare | Kuressaare Airport | URE/EEKE | 42,272 | ▲9.1% |
| 7. | Estonia | Kärdla | Kärdla Airport | KDL/EEKA | 16,181 | ▲34.8% |
| 8. | Estonia | Pärnu | Pärnu Airport | EPU/EEPU | 2,087 | ▼27.8% |
| 9. | Estonia | Ruhnu village | Ruhnu Airfield | –/EERU | 1,398 | ▼14.8% |
| 10. | Estonia | Tartu | Tartu Airport | TAY/EETU | 1,080 | ▼87.5% |
| 11. | Lithuania | Šiauliai | Šiauliai International Airport | SQQ/EYSA | 735 | 12.4% |
| 12. | Estonia | Sääre village | Kihnu Airfield | –/EEKU | 33 | ▲175% |

==== 2022 statistics ====
| Rank | Country | City | Airport | Code (IATA/ICAO) | Passengers (2022) | Change 2021–2022 |
|---|---|---|---|---|---|---|
| 1. | Latvia | Riga | Riga International Airport | RIX/EVRA | 5,380,779 | ▲128.70% |
| 2. | Lithuania | Vilnius | Vilnius International Airport | VNO/EYVI | 3,915,960 | ▲106.23% |
| 3. | Estonia | Tallinn | Lennart Meri Tallinn Airport | TLL/EETN | 2,748,255 | ▲111.22% |
| 4. | Lithuania | Kaunas | Kaunas International Airport | KUN/EYKA | 1,159,184 | ▲137.77% |
| 5. | Lithuania | Palanga | Palanga International Airport | PLQ/EYPA | 274,879 | ▲220.02% |
| 6. | Estonia | Kuressaare | Kuressaare Airport | URE/EEKE | 38,749 | ▲31.59% |
| 7. | Estonia | Kärdla | Kärdla Airport | KDL/EEKA | 12,004 | ▲11.52% |
| 8. | Estonia | Tartu | Tartu Airport | TAY/EETU | 8,653 | ▲1641.05% |
| 9. | Estonia | Pärnu | Pärnu Airport | EPU/EEPU | 2,887 | ▲661.74% |
| 10. | Estonia | Ruhnu village | Ruhnu Airfield | –/EERU | 1,641 | ▲4.46% |
| 11. | Lithuania | Šiauliai | Šiauliai International Airport | SQQ/EYSA | 654 | ▲26.49% |
| 12. | Estonia | Sääre village | Kihnu Airfield | –/EEKU | 12 | New entry |

==== 2021 statistics ====
| Rank | Country | City | Airport | Code (IATA/ICAO) | Passengers (2021) | Change 2020–2021 |
|---|---|---|---|---|---|---|
| 1. | Latvia | Riga | Riga International Airport | RIX/EVRA | 2,353,064 | ▲17.00% |
| 2. | Lithuania | Vilnius | Vilnius International Airport | VNO/EYVI | 1,898,817 | ▲44.68% |
| 3. | Estonia | Tallinn | Lennart Meri Tallinn Airport | TLL/EETN | 1,301,109 | ▲50.66% |
| 4. | Lithuania | Kaunas | Kaunas International Airport | KUN/EYKA | 487,532 | ▲32.25% |
| 5. | Lithuania | Palanga | Palanga International Airport | PLQ/EYPA | 85,895 | ▼44.30% |
| 6. | Estonia | Kuressaare | Kuressaare Airport | URE/EEKE | 29,447 | ▲74.68% |
| 7. | Estonia | Kärdla | Kärdla Airport | KDL/EEKA | 10,769 | ▲14.82% |
| 8. | Estonia | Ruhnu village | Ruhnu Airfield | –/EERU | 1,571 | ▲29.30% |
| 9. | Lithuania | Šiauliai | Šiauliai International Airport | SQQ/EYSA | 517 | ▲46.46% |
| 10. | Estonia | Tartu | Tartu Airport | TAY/EETU | 497 | ▼91.54% |
| 11. | Estonia | Pärnu | Pärnu Airport | EPU/EEPU | 379 | ▲4.99% |
| 12. | Latvia | Liepaja | Liepaja International Airport | LPX/EVLA | <100 (Note: Airport did not report the official number in the annual report.) | ▼ |

==== 2020 statistics ====
| Rank | Country | City | Airport | Code (IATA/ICAO) | Passengers (2020) | Change 2019–2020 |
|---|---|---|---|---|---|---|
| 1. | Latvia | Riga | Riga International Airport | RIX/EVRA | 2,011,155 | ▼74.20% |
| 2. | Lithuania | Vilnius | Vilnius International Airport | VNO/EYVI | 1,312,468 | ▼73.78% |
| 3. | Estonia | Tallinn | Lennart Meri Tallinn Airport | TLL/EETN | 863,589 | ▼73.60% |
| 4. | Lithuania | Kaunas | Kaunas International Airport | KUN/EYKA | 368,645 | ▼68.00% |
| 5. | Lithuania | Palanga | Palanga International Airport | PLQ/EYPA | 123,948 | ▼63.84% |
| 6. | Estonia | Kuressaare | Kuressaare Airport | URE/EEKE | 16,858 | ▼ |
| 7. | Estonia | Kärdla | Kärdla Airport | KDL/EEKA | 9,379 | |
| 8. | Estonia | Tartu | Tartu Airport | TAY/EETU | 5,874 | |
| 9. | Latvia | Liepaja | Liepaja International Airport | LPX/EVLA | <4,000 | ▼ |
| 10. | Estonia | Ruhnu village | Ruhnu Airfield | –/EERU | 1,215 | |
| 11. | Estonia | Pärnu | Pärnu Airport | EPU/EEPU | 361 | |
| 12. | Lithuania | Šiauliai | Šiauliai International Airport | SQQ/EYSA | 353 | ▲5.69% |

==== 2019 statistics ====
| Rank | Country | City | Airport | Code (IATA/ICAO) | Passengers (2019) | Change 2018–2019 |
|---|---|---|---|---|---|---|
| 1. | Latvia | Riga | Riga International Airport | RIX/EVRA | 7,798,394 | ▲10.57% |
| 2. | Lithuania | Vilnius | Vilnius International Airport | VNO/EYVI | 5,004,921 | ▲1.67% |
| 3. | Estonia | Tallinn | Lennart Meri Tallinn Airport | TLL/EETN | 3,267,909 | ▲8.65% |
| 4. | Lithuania | Kaunas | Kaunas International Airport | KUN/EYKA | 1,160,591 | ▲14.79% |
| 5. | Lithuania | Palanga | Palanga International Airport | PLQ/EYPA | 338,309 | ▲6.84% |
| 6. | Estonia | Kuressaare | Kuressaare Airport | URE/EEKE | 20,116 | |
| 7. | Latvia | Liepaja | Liepaja International Airport | LPX/EVLA | 13,835 | ▲41.88% |
| 8. | Lithuania | Šiauliai | Šiauliai International Airport | SQQ/EYSA | 334 | ▼83.17% |

==== 2018 statistics ====
| Rank | Country | City | Airport | Code (IATA/ICAO) | Passengers (2018) | Change 2017–2018 |
|---|---|---|---|---|---|---|
| 1. | Latvia | Riga | Riga International Airport | RIX/EVRA | 7,056,089 | ▲15.72% |
| 2. | Lithuania | Vilnius | Vilnius International Airport | VNO/EYVI | 4,922,949 | ▲30.87% |
| 3. | Estonia | Tallinn | Lennart Meri Tallinn Airport | TLL/EETN | 3,007,644 | ▲13.60% |
| 4. | Lithuania | Kaunas | Kaunas International Airport | KUN/EYKA | 1,011,067 | ▼14.76% |
| 5. | Lithuania | Palanga | Palanga International Airport | PLQ/EYPA | 316,643 | ▲6.54% |
| 6. | Latvia | Liepāja | Liepāja International Airport | LPX/EVLA | 9,751 | ▲104% |
| 7. | Lithuania | Šiauliai | Šiauliai International Airport | SQQ/EYSA | 1,985 | ▲179% |

==== 2017 statistics ====
| Rank | Country | City | Airport | Code (IATA/ICAO) | Passengers (2017) | Change 2016–2017 |
|---|---|---|---|---|---|---|
| 1. | Latvia | Riga | Riga International Airport | RIX/EVRA | 6,097,434 | ▲12.87% |
| 2. | Lithuania | Vilnius | Vilnius International Airport | VNO/EYVI | 3,761,837 | ▼1.39% |
| 3. | Estonia | Tallinn | Lennart Meri Tallinn Airport | TLL/EETN | 2,648,361 | ▲20.19% |
| 4. | Lithuania | Kaunas | Kaunas International Airport | KUN/EYKA | 1,186,081 | ▲60.18% |
| 5. | Lithuania | Palanga | Palanga International Airport | PLQ/EYPA | 297,197 | ▲27.76% |
| 6. | Estonia | Tartu | Tartu Airport | TAY/EETU | 30,296 | |
| 7. | Estonia | Kuressaare | Kuressaare Airport | URE/EEKE | 19,231 | |
| 8. | Estonia | Kärdla | Kärdla Airport | KDL/EEKA | 9,168 | |
| 9. | Latvia | Liepāja | Liepāja International Airport | LPX/EVLA | 4,780 | Steady |
| 10. | Lithuania | Šiauliai | Šiauliai International Airport | SQQ/EYSA | 712 | ▲46.5% |

==== 2013 statistics ====
| Rank | Country | City | Airport | Code (IATA/ICAO) | Passengers (2013) | Change 2012–2013 |
|---|---|---|---|---|---|---|
| 1. | Latvia | Riga | Riga International Airport | RIX/EVRA | 4,793,213 | +0.6% |
| 2. | Lithuania | Vilnius | Vilnius International Airport | VNO/EYVI | 2,661,869 | +20.6% |
| 3. | Estonia | Tallinn | Lennart Meri Tallinn Airport | TLL/EETN | 1,958,801 | -11.2% |
| 4. | Lithuania | Kaunas | Kaunas International Airport | KUN/EYKA | 695,509 | -16.2% |
| 5. | Lithuania | Palanga | Palanga International Airport | PLQ/EYPA | 127,890 | -1.0% |
| 6. | Estonia | Tartu | Tartu Airport | TAY/EETU | 13,690 | -32.7% |
| 7. | Estonia | Kuressaare | Kuressaare Airport | URE/EEKE | 13,163 | +15.25% |
| 8. | Estonia | Kärdla | Kärdla Airport | KDL/EEKA | 10,222 | +5.38% |
| 9. | Estonia | Pärnu | Pärnu Airport | EPU/EEPU | 3,538 | -37.2% |
| 10. | Estonia | Kihnu | Kihnu Airfield | ---/EEKU | 2,434 | -1.4% |
| 11. | Estonia | Ruhnu | Ruhnu Airfield | ---/EERU | 1,214 | -11.0% |
| 12. | Lithuania | Šiauliai | Šiauliai International Airport | SQQ/EYSA | 942 | -4.46% |

==== 2012 statistics ====
| Rank | Country | City | Airport | Code (IATA/ICAO) | Passengers (2012) | Change 2011–2012 |
|---|---|---|---|---|---|---|
| 1. | Latvia | Riga | Riga International Airport | RIX/EVRA | 4,767,878 | -6.6% |
| 2. | Lithuania | Vilnius | Vilnius International Airport | VNO/EYVI | 2,208,096 | +28.9% |
| 3. | Estonia | Tallinn | Lennart Meri Tallinn Airport | TLL/EETN | 2,206,692 | +15.3% |
| 4. | Lithuania | Kaunas | Kaunas International Airport | KUN/EYKA | 830,268 | -4.9% |
| 5. | Lithuania | Palanga | Palanga International Airport | PLQ/EYPA | 128,169 | +15.3% |
| 6. | Estonia | Tartu | Tartu Airport | TAY/EETU | 20,302 | +9.3% |
| 7. | Estonia | Kuressaare | Kuressaare Airport | URE/EEKE | 11,421 | -35.9% |
| 8. | Estonia | Kärdla | Kärdla Airport | KDL/EEKA | 9,700 | -9.3% |
| 9. | Estonia | Pärnu | Pärnu Airport | EPU/EEPU | 5,634 | -59.6% |
| 10. | Estonia | Kihnu | Kihnu Airfield | ---/EEKU | 2,474 | +7.9% |
| 11. | Estonia | Ruhnu | Ruhnu Airfield | ---/EERU | 1,364 | -7.0% |
| 12. | Lithuania | Šiauliai | Šiauliai International Airport | SQQ/EYSA | 986 | |

== Aircraft movements ==
=== 2026 statistics ===
| Rank | Country | City | Airport | Code (IATA/ICAO) | Movements (2026) | Change 2019-2026 |
|---|---|---|---|---|---|---|
| 1. | Latvia | Riga | Riga International Airport | RIX/EVRA | 87,007 | ▲5.1% |
| 2. | Lithuania | Vilnius | Vilnius Čiurlionis International Airport | VNO/EYVI | 47,440 | ▲4.5% |
| 3. | Estonia | Tallinn | Lennart Meri Tallinn Airport | TLL/EETN | 47,867 | ▼ -1.2% |
| 4. | Lithuania | Kaunas | Kaunas International Airport | KUN/EYKA | 9,888 | ▼3.1% |
| 5. | Lithuania | Palanga | Palanga International Airport | PLQ/EYPA | 5,167 | ▲6.8% |

=== 2019 statistics ===
| Rank | Country | City | Airport | Code (IATA/ICAO) | Movements (2019) | Change 2018–2019 |
|---|---|---|---|---|---|---|
| 1. | Latvia | Riga | Riga International Airport | RIX/EVRA | 87,007 | ▲4.2% |
| 2. | Estonia | Tallinn | Lennart Meri Tallinn Airport | TLL/EETN | 47,867 | ▼1.4% |
| 3. | Lithuania | Vilnius | Vilnius International Airport | VNO/EYVI | 47,440 | ▲0.5% |
| 4. | Lithuania | Kaunas | Kaunas International Airport | KUN/EYKA | 9,888 | ▲4.6% |
| 5. | Lithuania | Palanga | Palanga International Airport | PLQ/EYPA | 5,167 | ▲6.8% |

=== 2012 statistics ===
| Rank | Country | City | Airport | Code (IATA/ICAO) | Movements (2012) | Change 2011–2012 |
|---|---|---|---|---|---|---|
| 1. | Latvia | Riga | Riga International Airport | RIX/EVRA | 68,570 | ▼5.9% |
| 2. | Estonia | Tallinn | Lennart Meri Tallinn Airport | TLL/EETN | 48,531 | ▲20.4% |
| 3. | Lithuania | Vilnius | Vilnius International Airport | VNO/EYVI | 29,995 | ▲8.3% |
| 4. | Lithuania | Kaunas | Kaunas International Airport | KUN/EYKA | 8,559 | ▼5.1% |
| 5. | Lithuania | Palanga | Palanga International Airport | PLQ/EYPA | 3,047 | ▲2.9% |

== Freight and mail tonnes ==
=== 2021 statistics ===
| Rank | Country | City | Airport | Code (IATA/ICAO) | Cargo (2021) | Change 2020–2021 |
|---|---|---|---|---|---|---|
| 1. | Latvia | Riga | Riga International Airport | RIX/EVRA | 23,520 | ▲22.2% |
| 2. | Lithuania | Vilnius | Vilnius International Airport | VNO/EYVI | 14,706 | ▲2.0% |
| 3. | Estonia | Tallinn | Lennart Meri Tallinn Airport | TLL/EETN | 10,534 | ▲15.4% |
| 4. | Lithuania | Kaunas | Kaunas International Airport | KUN/EYKA | 5,065 | ▼5.6% |
| 5. | Lithuania | Šiauliai | Šiauliai International Airport | SQQ/EYSA | 60 | ▲57.1% |
| 6. | Lithuania | Palanga | Palanga International Airport | PLQ/EYPA | 1 | ▼58.3% |

=== 2012 statistics ===
| Rank | Country | City | Airport | Code (IATA/ICAO) | Cargo (2012) | Change 2011–2012 |
|---|---|---|---|---|---|---|
| 1. | Latvia | Riga | Riga International Airport | RIX/EVRA | 31,460 | ▲171.9% |
| 2. | Estonia | Tallinn | Lennart Meri Tallinn Airport | TLL/EETN | 23,760 | ▲29.5% |
| 3. | Lithuania | Vilnius | Vilnius International Airport | VNO/EYVI | 5,931 | ▲2.6% |
| 4. | Lithuania | Šiauliai | Šiauliai International Airport | SQQ/EYSA | 5,041 | New entry |
| 4. | Lithuania | Kaunas | Kaunas International Airport | KUN/EYKA | 3,364 | ▼20.3% |
| 5. | Lithuania | Palanga | Palanga International Airport | PLQ/EYPA | 6 | ▼40.0% |

== Busiest air routes ==
These are the busiest nonstop air routes within and to/from the Baltic States based on total annually carried passengers on each route. Inter-Baltic routes are bolded.

=== 2020s ===
==== 2024 statistics ====
20 unique destinations and two inter-Baltic connections appear within the Top 45. Locations with multiple connections were: 4 – London; 3 – Antalya, Helsinki, Stockholm, Warsaw, Frankfurt, Copenhagen, Milan, Istanbul; 2 – Oslo, Berlin, Rome and Paris.

| Rank | City 1 | City 2 | Passengers (2024) |
|---|---|---|---|
| 1. | Riga | London (Gatwick&Heathrow&Stansted) | 432,876 |
| 2. | Vilnius | Antalya (Antalya&Gazipaşa) | 410,978 |
| 3. ▲ | Riga | Helsinki | 393,431 |
| 4. ▼ | Vilnius | London (City&Luton&Stansted) | 378,335 |
| 5. | Kaunas | London (Luton&Stansted) | 358,721 |
| 6. ▲ | Riga | Stockholm | 323,306 |
| 7. | Riga | Oslo (Gardermoen&Torp) | 323,646 |
| 8. ▲ | Tallinn | Stockholm | 321,595 |
| 9. ▼ | **Riga** **Tallinn** | —N/a | 304,004 |
| 10. ▼ | Tallinn | Helsinki | 302,473 |
| 11. ▼ | Tallinn | Frankfurt | 295,732 |
| 12. ▼ | Vilnius | Warsaw | 287,411 |
| 13. ▲ | Riga | Frankfurt | 275,712 |
| 14. ▲ | Vilnius | Frankfurt (Main&Hahn) | 261,354 |
| 15. ▲ | **Riga** **Vilnius** | —N/a | 255,080 |
| 16. ▲ | Riga | Vienna | 230,913 |
| 17. ▼ | Riga | Berlin | 227,176 |
| 18. ▲ | Riga | Copenhagen | 213,174 |
| 19. ▲ | Riga | Amsterdam | 212,510 |
| 20. ▲ | Tallinn | London (Gatwick&Luton&Stansted) | 206,085 |
| 21. ▲ | Tallinn | Warsaw | 205,171 |
| 22. ▼ | Vilnius | Milan (Malpensa&Orio al Serio) | 196,511 |
| 23. ▼ | Tallinn | Antalya | 186,955 |
| 24. ▲ | Vilnius | Istanbul | 184,894 |
| 25. ▲ | Riga | Istanbul | 173,996 |
| 26. ▼ | Vilnius | Oslo | 162,543 |
| 27. ▼ | Riga | Antalya | 155,394 |
| 28. | Vilnius | Rome | 154,022 |
| 29. ▼ | Riga | Warsaw (Chopin&Modlin) | 153,955 |
| 30. ▼ | Vilnius | Paris (Charles de Gaulle&Beauvais) | 151,595 |
| 31. ▲ | Riga | Milan (Malpensa&Orio al Serio) | 145,506 |
| 32. | Vilnius | Barcelona | 145,262 |
| 33. | Vilnius | Copenhagen | 143,904 |
| 34. ▲ | Tallinn | Milan (Malpensa&Orio al Serio) | 140,429 |
| 35. ▼ | Riga | Munich | 139,699 |
| 36. ▼ | Vilnius | Helsinki | 135,864 |
| 37. ▲ | Vilnius | Stockholm | 131,703 |
| 38. ▼ | Kaunas | Copenhagen | 130,783 |
| 39. ▼ | Riga | Paris | 130,701 |
| 40. ▼ | Riga | Rome (Ciampino&Fiumicino) | 125,104 |
| 41. | Vilnius | Berlin | 123,736 |
| 42. | Riga | Prague | 120,727 |
| 43. ▼ | Riga | Dublin | 120,709 |
| 44. | Tallinn | Istanbul | 114,749 |
| 45. ▼ | Vilnius | Eindhoven | 114,278 |

==== 2022 statistics ====
21 unique destinations and two inter-Baltic connections appear within the Top 45. Locations with multiple connections were: 5 – London; 3 – Antalya, Dublin, Frankfurt, Helsinki, Milan, Stockholm, Warsaw; 2 – Copenhagen, Istanbul, Oslo, and Paris.

| Rank | City 1 | City 2 | Passengers (2022) |
|---|---|---|---|
| 1. | Riga | London (Gatwick&Luton&Stansted) | 418,125 |
| 2. | Vilnius | Antalya (Antalya&Gazipaşa) | 381,644 |
| 3. | Vilnius | London (City&Luton&Stansted) | 366,584 |
| 4. | Riga | Helsinki | 281,021 |
| 5. | Kaunas | London (Luton&Stansted) | 269,944 |
| 6. | Tallinn | Helsinki | 252,473 |
| 7. | Riga | Oslo (Gardermoen&Torp) | 236,970 |
| 8. | **Riga** **Tallinn** | —N/a | 232,872 |
| 9. | Riga | Stockholm | 221,100 |
| 10. | Tallinn | Frankfurt | 216,871 |
| 11. | Vilnius | Warsaw | 214,147 |
| 12. | Tallinn | Stockholm | 210,037 |
| 13. | Vilnius | Oslo (Gardermoen&Torp) | 204,348 |
| 14. | Riga | Berlin | 181,482 |
| 15. | Riga | Frankfurt | 180,267 |
| 16. | Vilnius | Frankfurt (Main&Hahn) | 178,940 |
| 17. | Tallinn | Antalya | 175,426 |
| 18. | **Riga** **Vilnius** | —N/a | 165,544 |
| 19. | Riga | Warsaw (Chopin&Modlin) | 159,288 |
| 20. | Vilnius | Milan (Malpensa&Orio al Serio) | 155,901 |
| 21. | Riga | Vienna | 153,481 |
| 22. | Tallinn | Warsaw | 150,010 |
| 23. | Riga | Amsterdam | 145,841 |
| 24. | Riga | Copenhagen | 127,574 |
| 25. | Riga | Antalya | 126,814 |
| 26. | Riga | Dublin | 126,775 |
| 27. | Vilnius | Istanbul | 125,173 |
| 28. | Kaunas | Copenhagen | 117,054 |
| 29. | Vilnius | Paris (Charles de Gaulle&Beauvais) | 109,777 |
| 30. | Riga | Brussels (National&Charleroi) | 106,597 |
| 31. | Vilnius | Helsinki | 101,065 |
| 32. | Riga | Munich | 101,027 |
| 33. | Vilnius | Eindhoven | 98,714 |
| 34. | Riga | Rome (Ciampino&Fiumicino) | 98,147 |
| 35. | Tallinn | London (Gatwick&Stansted) | 96,603 |
| 36. | Tallinn | Milan (Malpensa&Orio al Serio) | 93,789 |
| 37. | Vilnius | Dublin | 92,550 |
| 38. | Riga | Paris | 92,032 |
| 39. | Riga | Istanbul | 89,815 |
| 40. | Riga | Barcelona | 86,685 |
| 41. | Vilnius | Stockholm | 85,397 |
| 42. | Riga | Prague | 85,277 |
| 43. | Riga | Milan | 85,184 |
| 44. | Kaunas | Dublin | 84,865 |
| 45. | Palanga | London (Luton&Stansted) | 80,877 |

=== 2010s ===
==== 2019 statistics ====
| Rank | City 1 | City 2 | Passengers (2019) |
|---|---|---|---|
| 1. | Riga | Moscow (Sheremetevo&Vnukovo) | 649,121 |
| 2. | Riga | London (Gatwick&Luton&Stansted) | 603,608 |
| 3. | Vilnius | London (City&Luton&Stansted) | 479,986 |
| 4. | Riga | Oslo (Gardermoen&Torp) | 344,712 |
| 5. | Riga | Helsinki | 333,983 |
| 6. | Vilnius | Antalya (Antalya&Gazipaşa) | 321,079 |
| 7. | Kaunas | London (Luton&Stansted) | 311,618 |
| 8. | Tallinn | Helsinki | 295,711 |
| 9. | Riga | Berlin (Brandenburg&Tegel) | 292,014 |
| 10. | **Riga** | **Tallinn** | 289,900 |
| 11. | Tallinn | Stockholm | 288,695 |
| 12. | Vilnius | Kyiv (Boryspil&Zhuliany) | 287,303 |
| 13. | Tallinn | Frankfurt | 281,546 |
| 14. | Vilnius | Frankfurt(Main&Hahn) | 275,286 |
| 15. | Vilnius | Oslo (Gardermoen&Torp) | 267,908 |
| 16. | Riga | Stockholm | 260,414 |
| 17. | Riga | Frankfurt | 253,907 |
| 18. | Vilnius | Warsaw | 232,996 |
| 19. | **Riga** | **Vilnius** | 230,261 |
| 20. | Riga | Kyiv | 229,409 |
| 21. | Riga | Copenhagen | 222,072 |
| 22. | Riga | Saint Petersburg | 194,523 |
| 23. | Riga | Warsaw | 191,674 |
| 24. | Tallinn | Warsaw | 190,996 |
| 25. | Tallinn | London (Gatwick&Luton&Stansted) | 186,217 |
| 26. | Vilnius | Milan (Orio al Serio&Malpensa) | 179,269 |
| 27. | Riga | Amsterdam | 161,124 |
| 28. | Vilnius | Stockholm | 158,932 |
| 29. | Vilnius | Moscow | 158,773 |
| 30. | Riga | Dublin | 151,332 |
| 31. | Riga | Brussels (National&Charleroi) | 150,762 |
| 32. | Riga | Milan (Orio al Serio&Malpensa) | 148,882 |
| 33. | Riga | Paris | 145,889 |
| 34. | Riga | Vienna | 133,844 |
| 35. | Tallinn | Oslo | 127,537 |
| 36. | Vilnius | Helsinki | 123,452 |
| 37. | Riga | Munich | 123,000 |
| 38. | Tallinn | Moscow | 122,284 |
| 39. | Kaunas | Copenhagen | 120,238 |
| 40. | Vilnius | Copenhagen | 119,115 |

==== 2011 statistics ====
| Rank | City 1 | City 2 | Passengers (2011) | Change 2010–11 |
|---|---|---|---|---|
| 1. | Riga | London | 345,780 | +1.0% |
| 2. | Kaunas | London | 272,672 | +38.5% |
| 3. | Riga | Helsinki | 264,903 | +15.3% |
| 4. | Riga | Moscow | 226,481 | +24.1% |
| 5. | Riga | Stockholm | 215,592 | -3.3% |
| 6. | **Riga** | **Vilnius** | 191,977 | +22.5% |
| 7. | Riga | Oslo | 188,940 | +4.9% |
| 8. | Tallinn | Helsinki | 184,762 | +24.9% |
| 9. | **Riga** | **Tallinn** | 173,768 | +15.8% |
| 10. | Tallinn | London | 161,423 | +91.4% |
| 11. | Riga | Milan | 155,274 | +126.4% |
| 12. | Riga | Brussels | 152,362 | +0.4% |
| 13. | Vilnius | Frankfurt | 149,909 | +45.4% |
| 14. | Tallinn | Stockholm | 145,964 | +26.9% |
| 15. | Riga | Berlin | 143,658 | +7.4% |
| 16. | Riga | Copenhagen | 137,267 | +0.0% |
| 17. | Vilnius | London | 135,498 | +200.0% |
| 18. | Riga | Frankfurt | 133,210 | 6.3% |
| 19. | Tallinn | Copenhagen | 133,101 | -5.6% |
| 20. | Riga | Kyiv | 123,834 | +41.9% |
| 21. | Riga | Dublin | 122,508 | -18.7% |
| 22. | Tallinn | Oslo | 121,184 | +40.9% |
| 23. | Vilnius | Copenhagen | 118,464 | -20.0% |
| 24. | Riga | Istanbul | 114,314 | +4.3% |
| 25. | Riga | Paris | 98,577 | +14.9% |
| 26. | Riga | Barcelona | 94,417 | +11.5% |
| 27. | Riga | Amsterdam | 92,647 | +34.3% |
| 28. | Riga | Rome | 89,809 | +9.8% |
| 29. | Riga | Saint Petersburg | 89,037 | +56.4% |
| 30. | Vilnius | Antalya | 86,550 | -4.2% |

The routes ranked no 1, 2, 5, 10, 11, 12, 14, 17 and 22 includes the following airports:

- No 1: London Stansted Airport and Gatwick Airport
- No 2: London Stansted Airport, London Luton Airport and Gatwick Airport
- No 5: Stockholm Arlanda Airport and Stockholm Skavsta Airport
- No 10: Gatwick Airport, London Stansted Airport and London Luton Airport
- No 11: Milan Malpensa Airport and Orio al Serio Airport
- No 12: Brussels Airport and Brussels South Charleroi Airport
- No 14: Stockholm Arlanda Airport and Stockholm Skavsta Airport
- No 17: London Luton Airport and London Stansted Airport
- No 22: Oslo Airport, Gardermoen and Moss Airport, Rygge

== Gallery ==
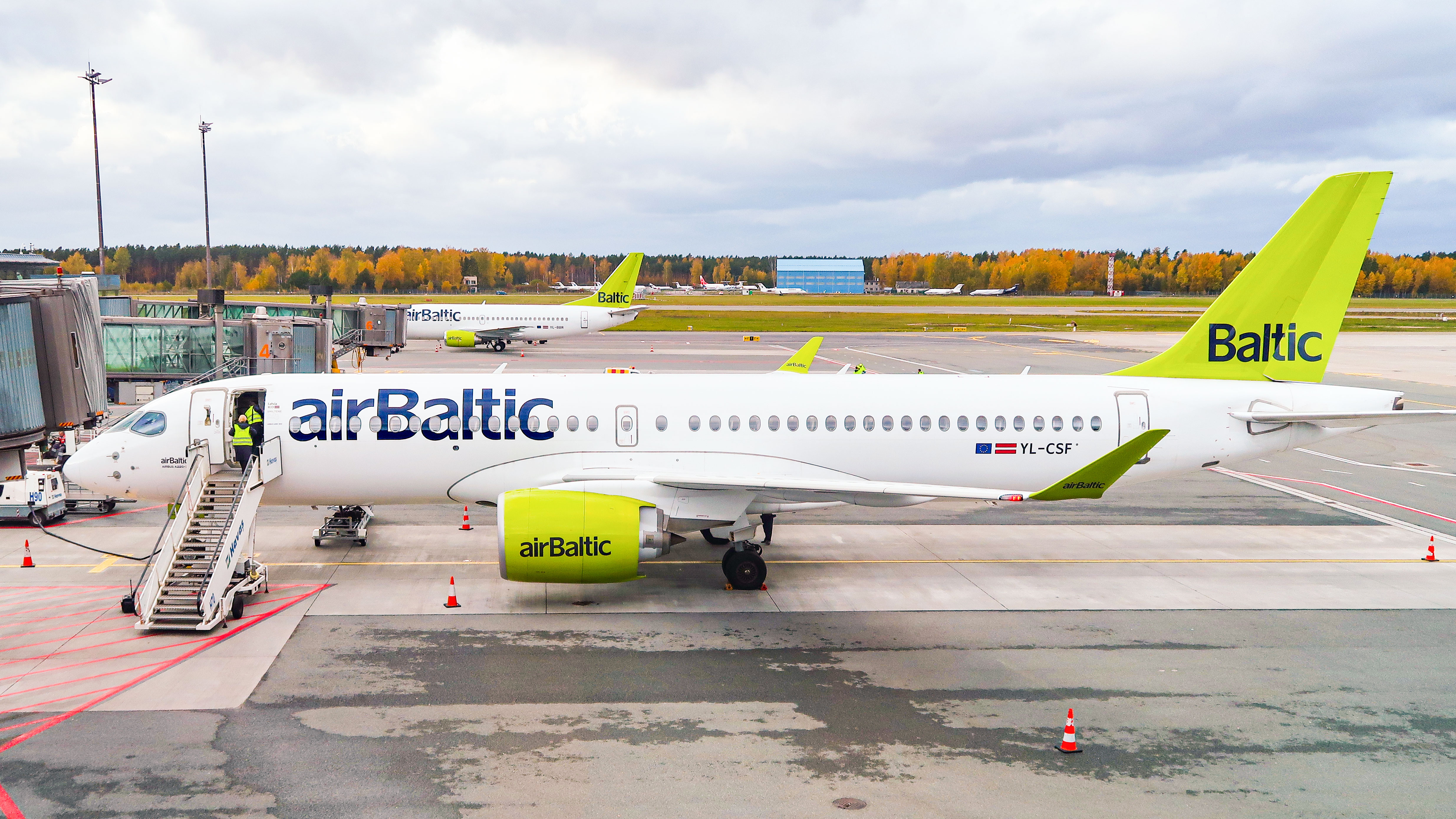
Riga International Airport, main hub of airBaltic

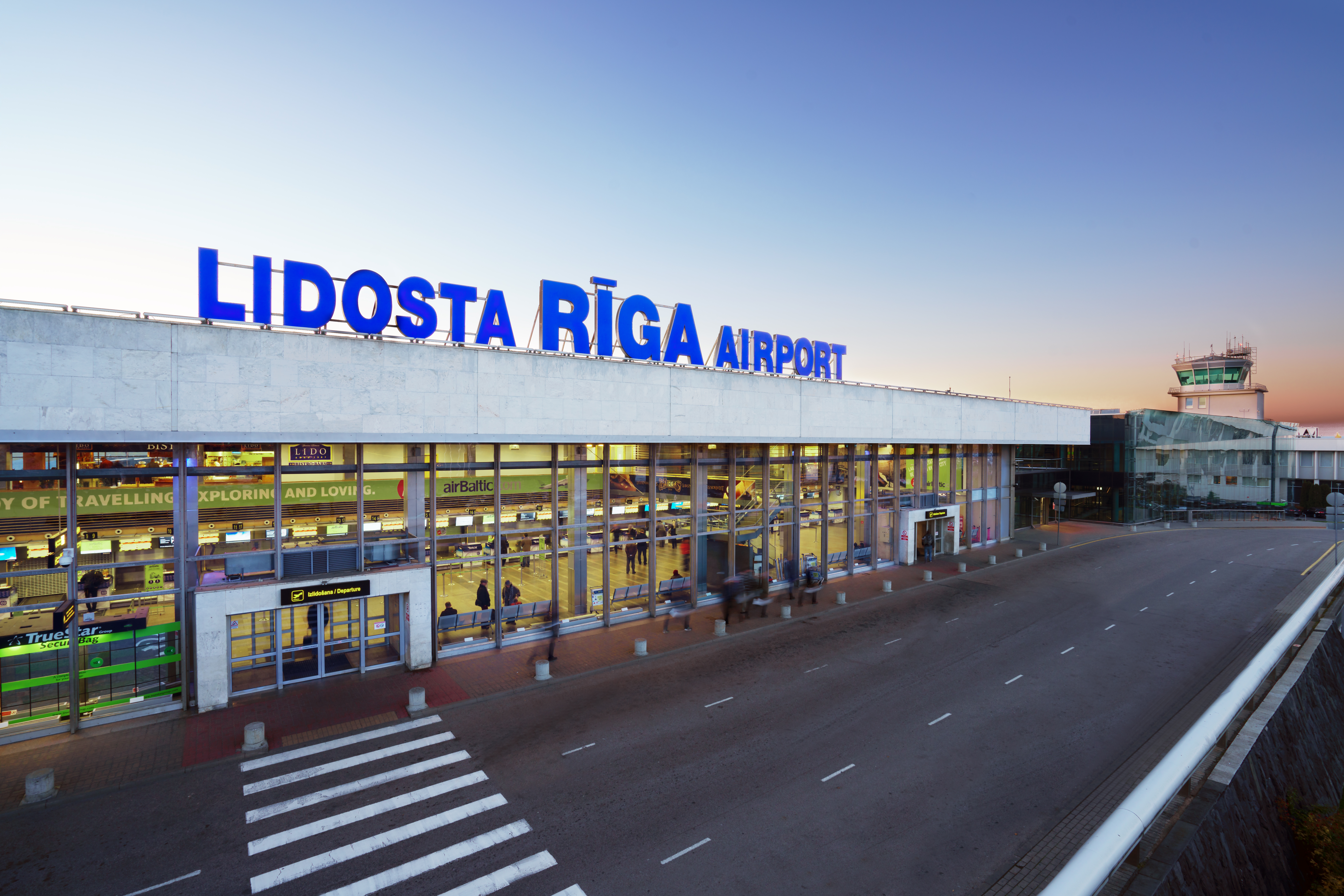
Riga International Airport

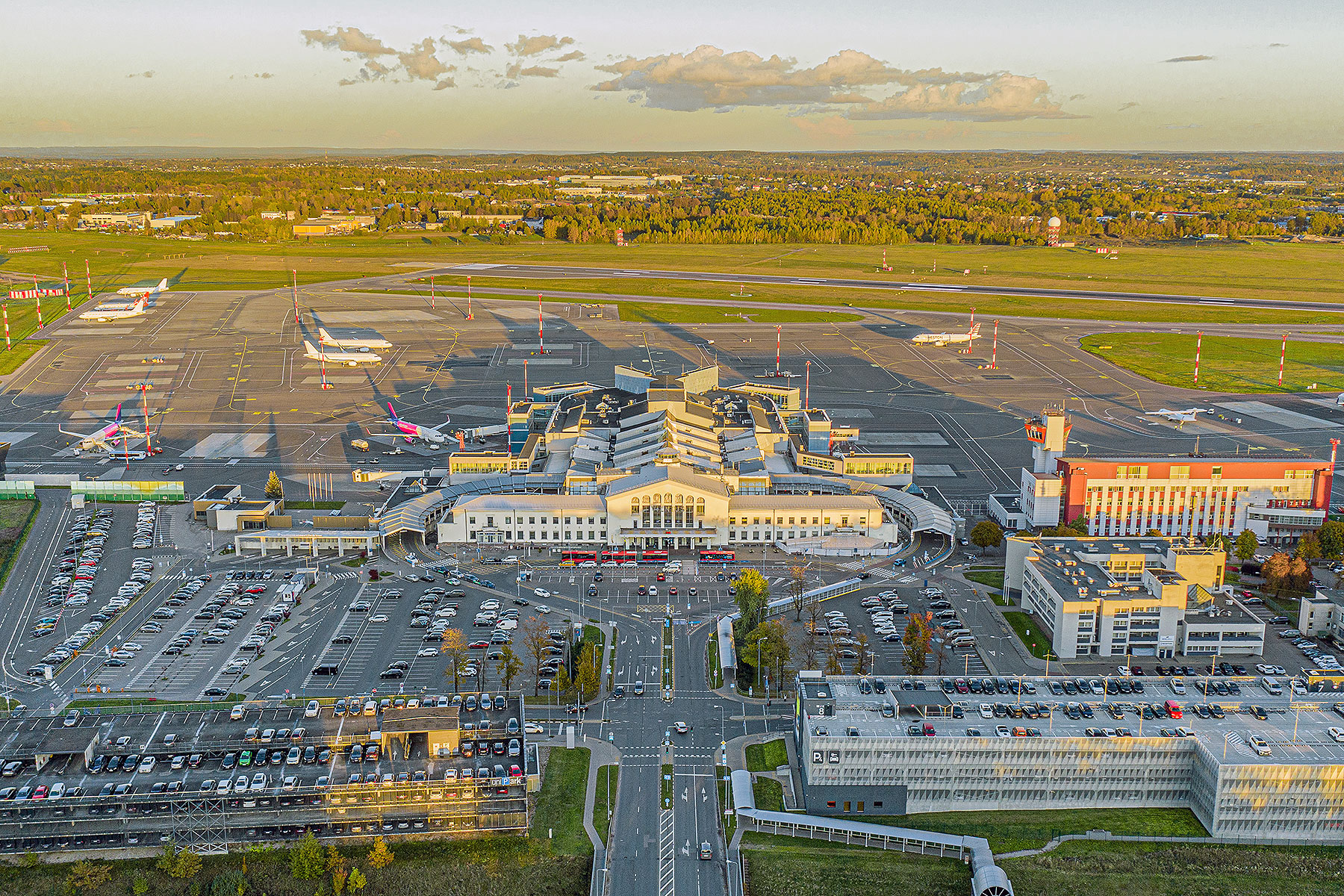
Vilnius Čiurlionis International Airport

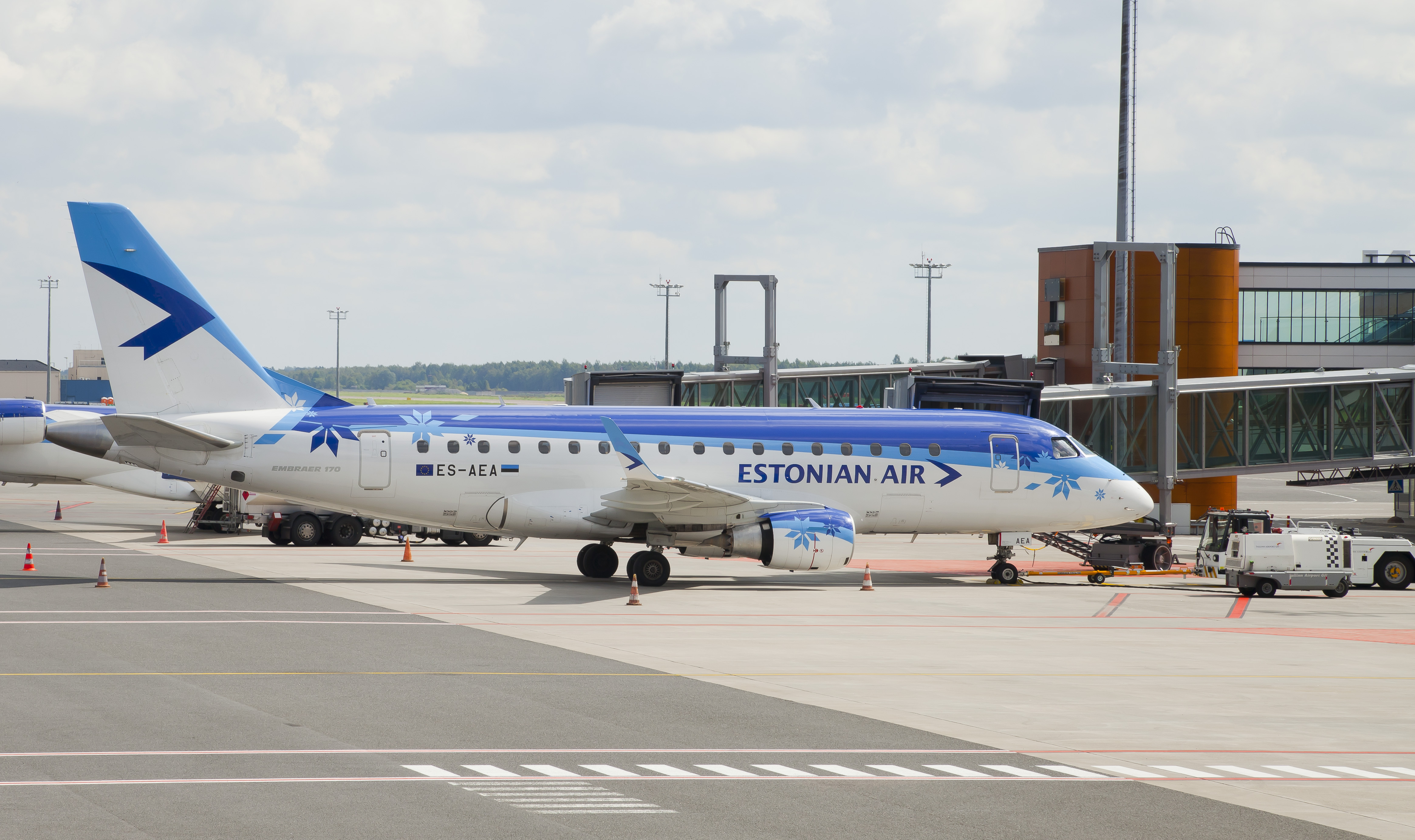
Tallinn International Airport

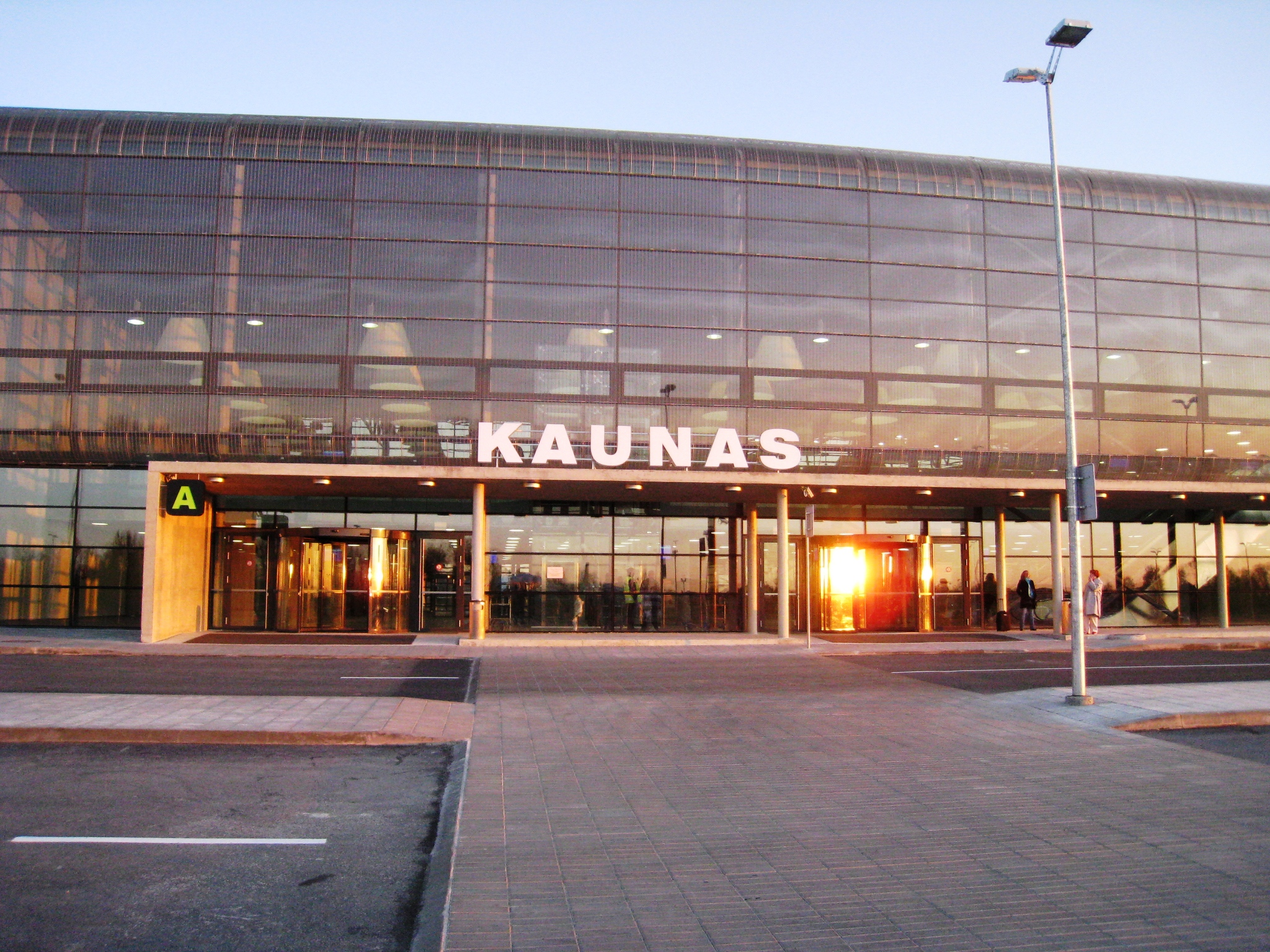
Kaunas International Airport terminal building

Palanga International Airport terminal building

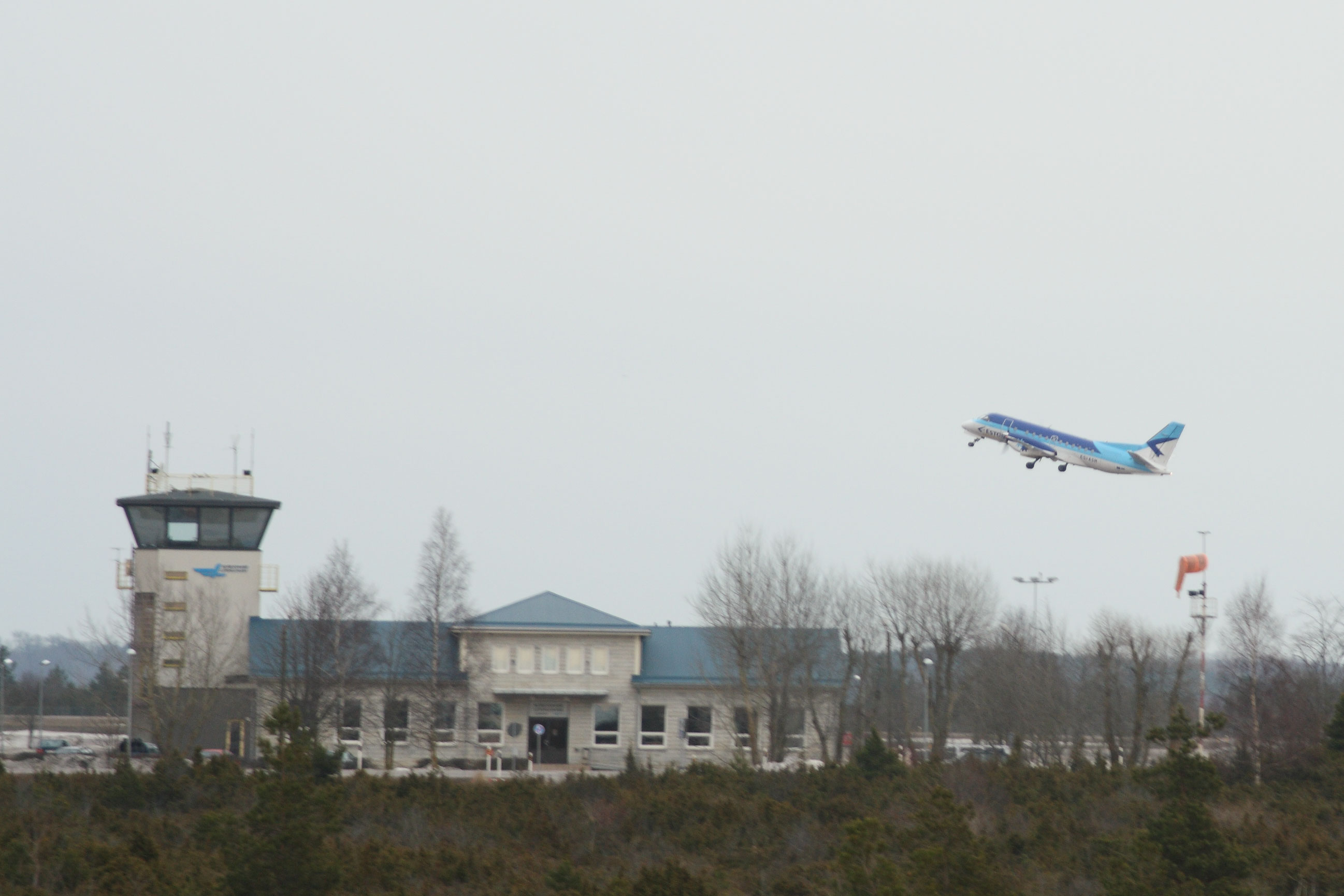
Kuressaare Airport terminal building

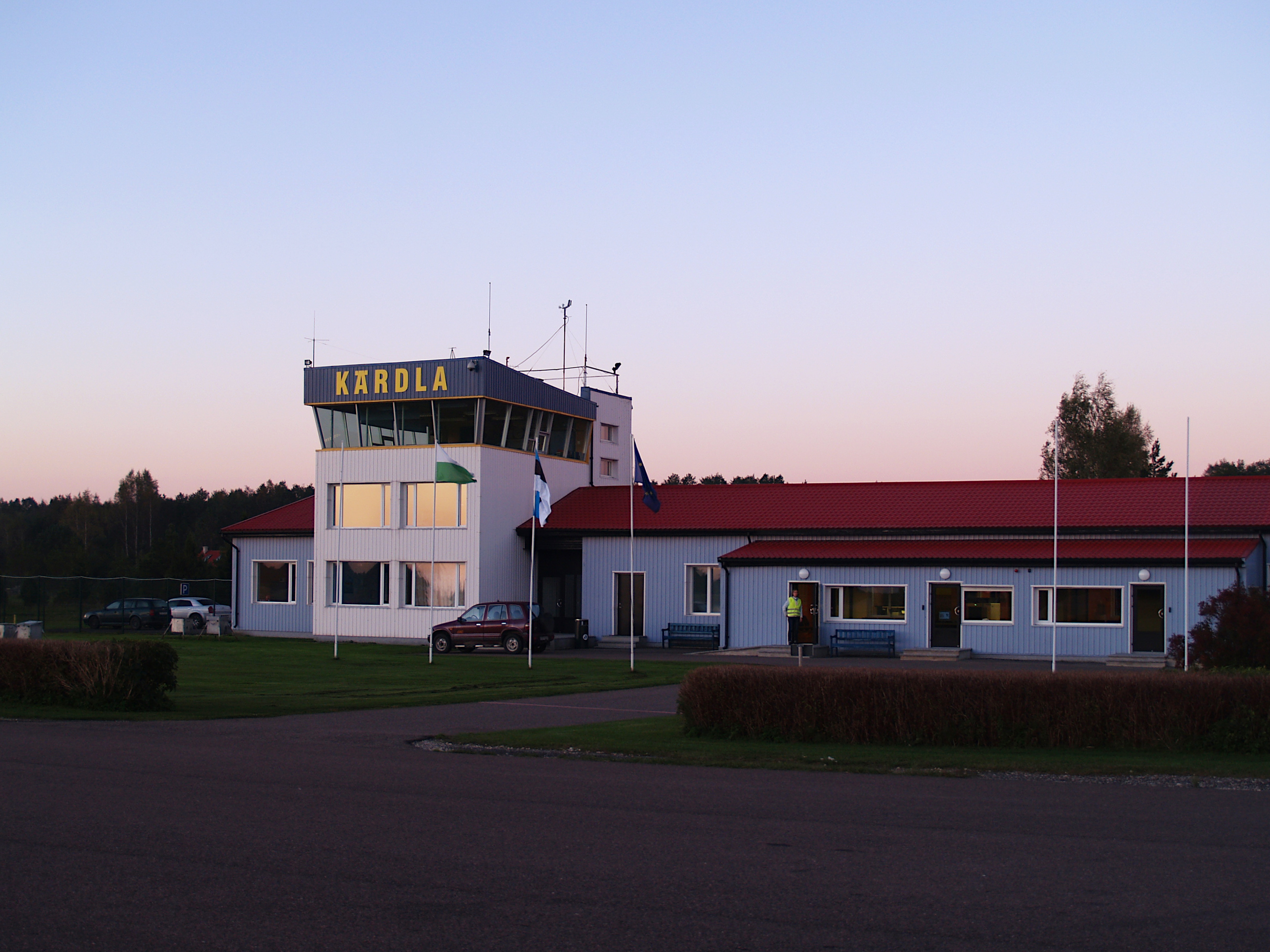
Kärdla Airport terminal building

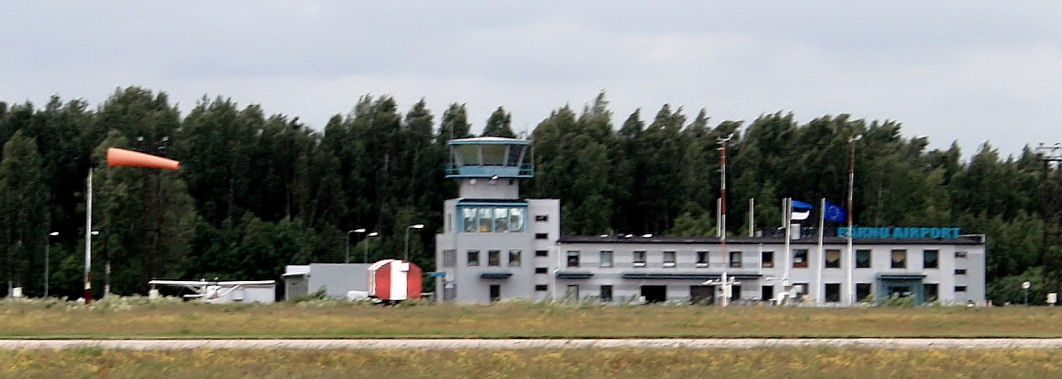
Pärnu Airport terminal building

== See also ==
- List of airports in Estonia
- List of airports in Latvia
- List of airports in Lithuania
- List of the busiest airports in the Nordic countries
- List of the busiest airports in the former Soviet Union
- List of the busiest airports in Europe
