= Air Livonia =

Estonian airline

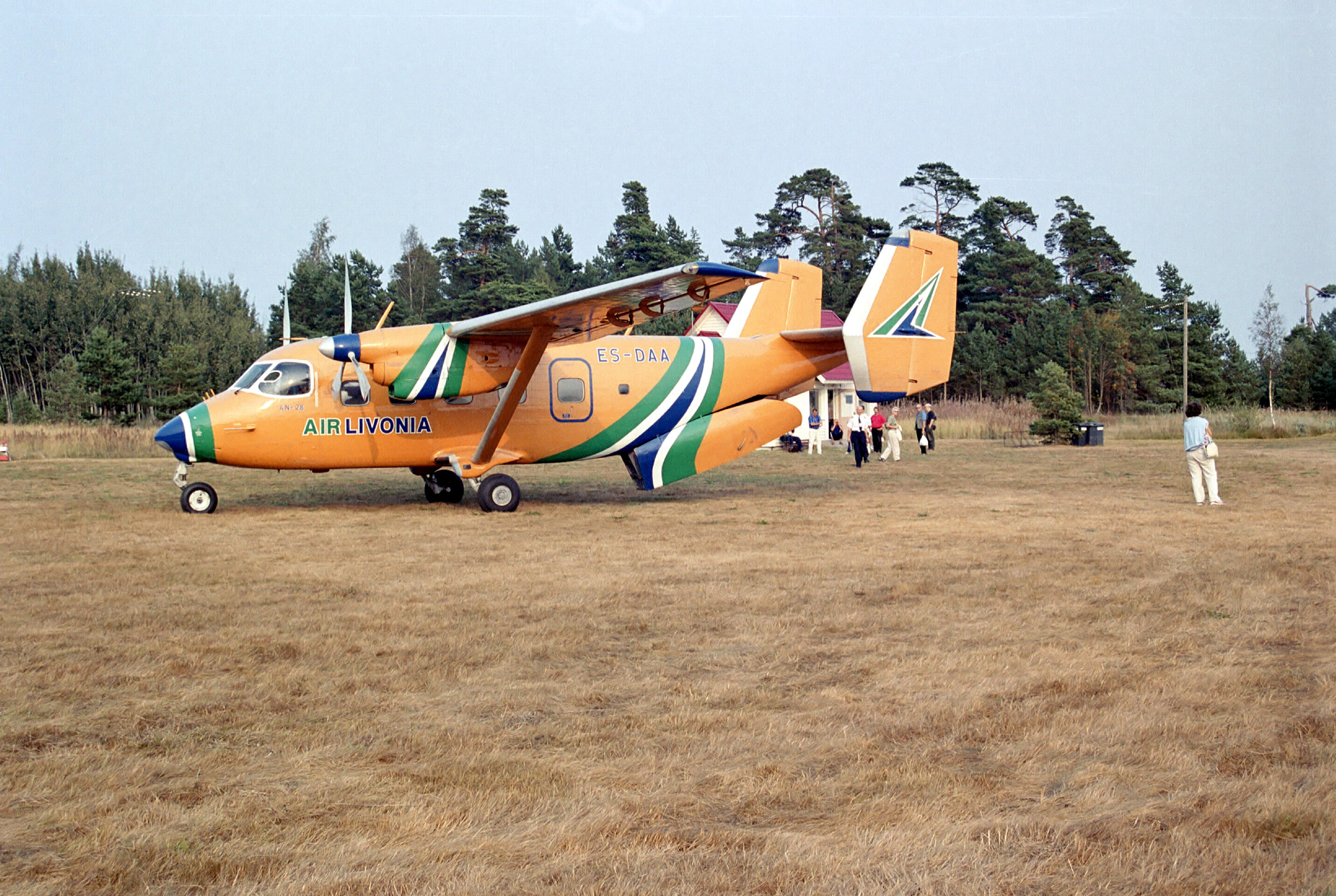
- Antonov An-28
IATA	ICAO	Call sign
—	LIV	LIVONIA
- Founded: 1999
- Ceased operations: unclear
- Operating bases: Pärnu
- Hubs: Pärnu Airport
- Focus cities: Kihnu Airfield; Ruhnu Airfield; Kuressaare Airport
- Fleet size: 2
- Destinations: 3
- Headquarters: Pärnu, Pärnumaa, Estonia
- Key people: Ants Aringo (CEO)

Air Livonia was a small airline based at Pärnu Airport in Estonia operating scheduled and charter flights. It was established in 1994 as Baltic Aeroservice and started flying after a few months. The corporate name was changed in 1997 and the first scheduled flights were started two years later.

== Code data ==
- ICAO Code: LIV
- Callsign: LIVONIA

== Services ==
Air Livonia operated the following scheduled services (at February 2005):

- Pärnu to Kihnu
- Pärnu to Ruhnu
- Pärnu to Kuressaare

== Fleet ==
The Air Livonia fleet includes the following aircraft:

- Antonov An-28
- Antonov An-2
