= Diamond Sky =

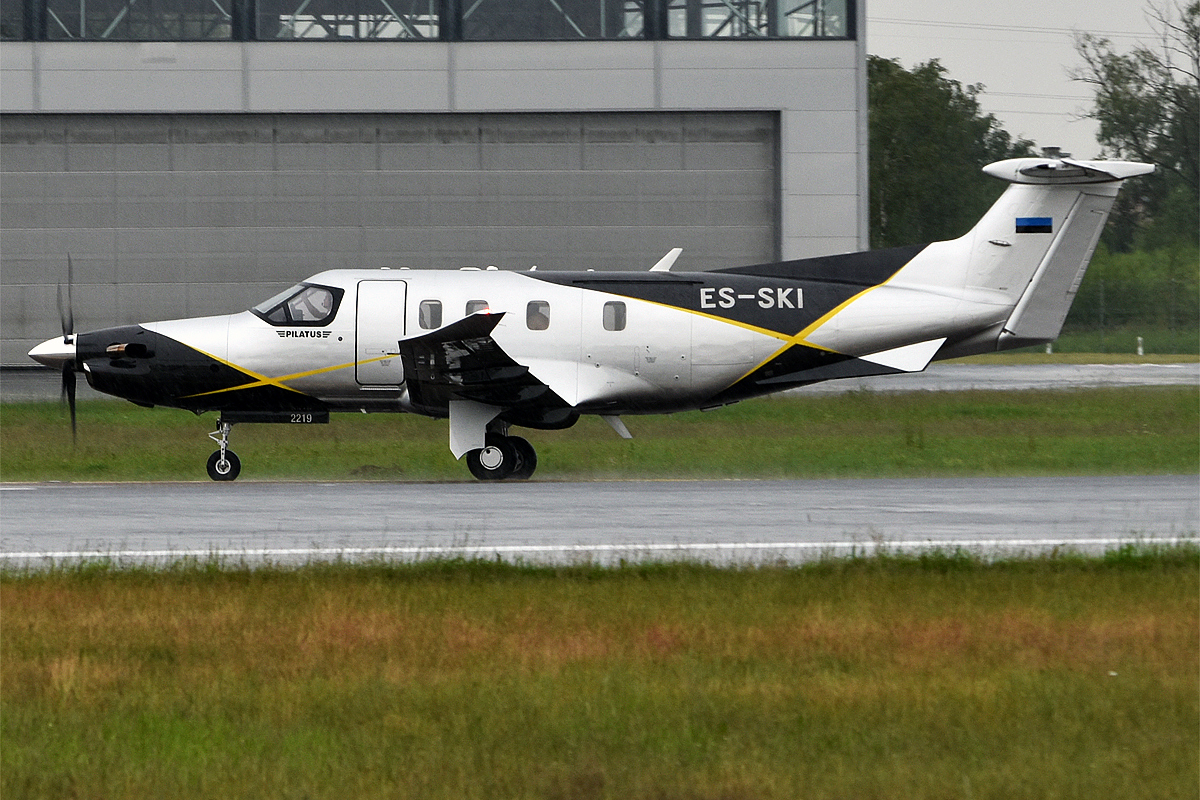
- Pilatus PC-12
IATA	ICAO	Call sign
—	DMS	DIAMOND
- Commenced operations: 2013; 13 years ago
- Fleet size: 15
- Headquarters: Tallinn, Estonia
- Website: https://diamond-sky.aero/

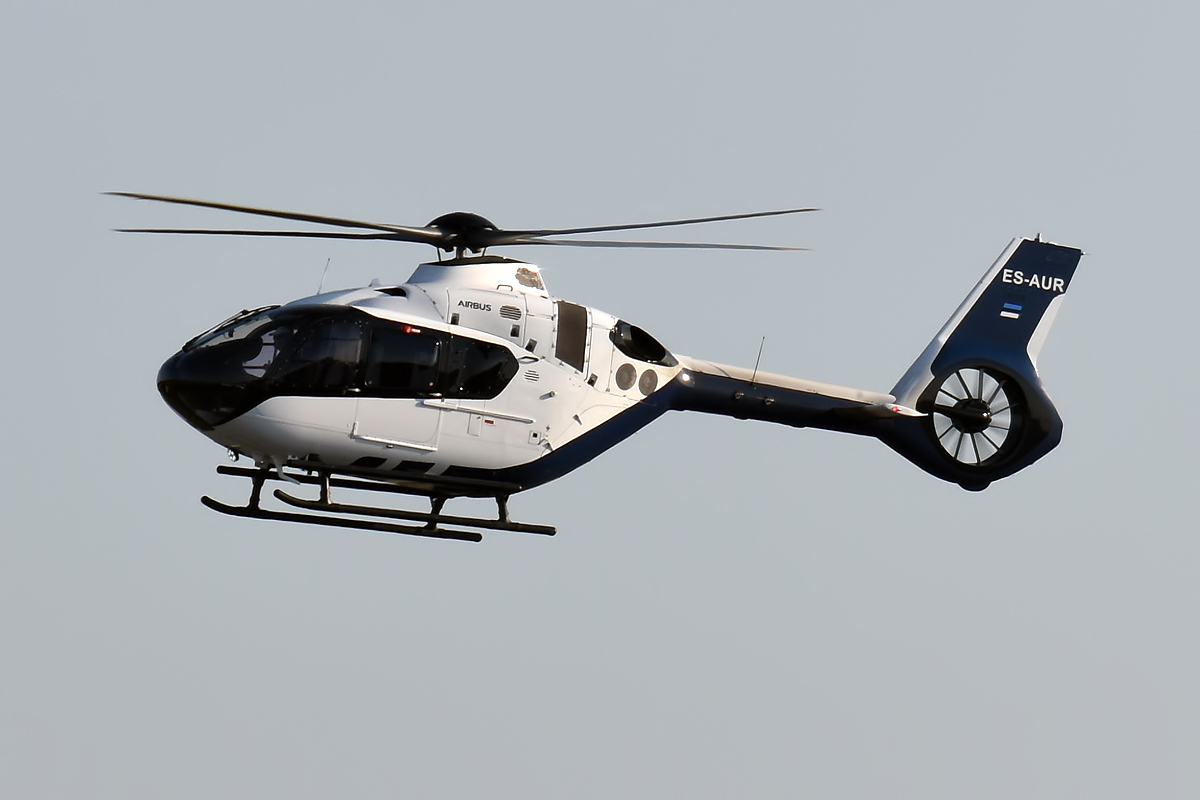
Airbus Helicopters H135

Diamond Sky OÜ is an Estonian airline headquartered in Tallinn. It operates charter passenger and cargo flights.

== History ==
The airline was founded in 2013. The Estonian Transport Agency has issued its Air Operator Certificate (AOC) and National Occupational Classification (NOC) for Diamond Sky.

== Destinations ==
The airline is present in Belgium, Estonia, Finland, Germany, Italy, the Netherlands, Singapore, Ukraine, United Arab Emirates and United States. The airline also operates flights to Ruhnu from and to Pärnu and Kuressaare.

== Fleet ==
Diamond Sky’s fleet size is 15.

Diamond Sky Fleet
Aircraft	Passengers	Crew
Nextant 400 XTi	8	2
PILATUS PC-12 NGX	6-7	1-2
Piaggio P.180 Avanti	8	1-2
Embraer Phenom 300E	9	1-2
Britten-Norman Islander BN2B	9	1-2
Diamond DA62	5-6	1-2
Cessna 510 Citation Mustang	4-5	1-2
Airbus 130	6-7	1-2
