= Kihnu Airfield =

Airfield in Estonia

- IATA: none; ICAO: EEKU

Summary
- Airport type: Public
- Owner: AS Pärnu Lennujaam
- Serves: Pärnu, Kihnu, Estonia
- Location: Sääre, Pärnu County
- Elevation AMSL: 11 ft / 3 m
- Coordinates: 58°08′54″N 024°00′09″E
- Website: parnu-airport.ee/.../kihnu

Map
- Location in Estonia

Runways
Direction	Length		Surface
Direction	m	ft	Surface
04/22	600	1,969	Grass
15/33	567	1,860	Grass
- Sources: Estonian AIP

Kihnu Airfield (ICAO: EEKU) is an airfield on Kihnu island in Estonia. The airfield is situated near the village of Sääre and is 22 nautical miles (41 km; 25 mi) southwest of Pärnu. It has no IATA airport code and is owned by AS Pärnu Lennujaam (Pärnu Airport Ltd).

== Overview ==
The airfield has two crossing runways; 04/22 600 m × 20 m (1,969 ft × 66 ft) and 15/33 567 m × 60 m (1,860 ft × 197 ft), both with grass surface. There are no landing lights or navigational systems on the airfield. Therefore, the airfield is only certified for VFR in daylight. There are no regular flights to Kihnu since Air Livonia stopped operating. Small private planes use the airfield for general flights in the summer. Also LFH does charter flights to Kihnu.

The operators of the airfield warn that the airfield is not fenced in, so pilots who wish to land outside of the airfield's operational hours need to make sure that there are no people, animals or other obstacles on the runways before landing.

== Airlines and destinations ==
There are no scheduled operations at the airfield.
