= Palanga International Airport =

Palanga Airport Palangos oro uostas

- IATA: PLQ; ICAO: EYPA

Summary
- Airport type: Public
- Owner: Ministry of Transport and Communications
- Operator: SE "Lithuanian Airports"
- Serves: Palanga, Lithuania
- Opened: 1937
- Elevation AMSL: 10 m (33 ft)
- Coordinates: 55°58′24″N 021°05′38″E
- Website: www.palanga-airport.lt/en

Maps
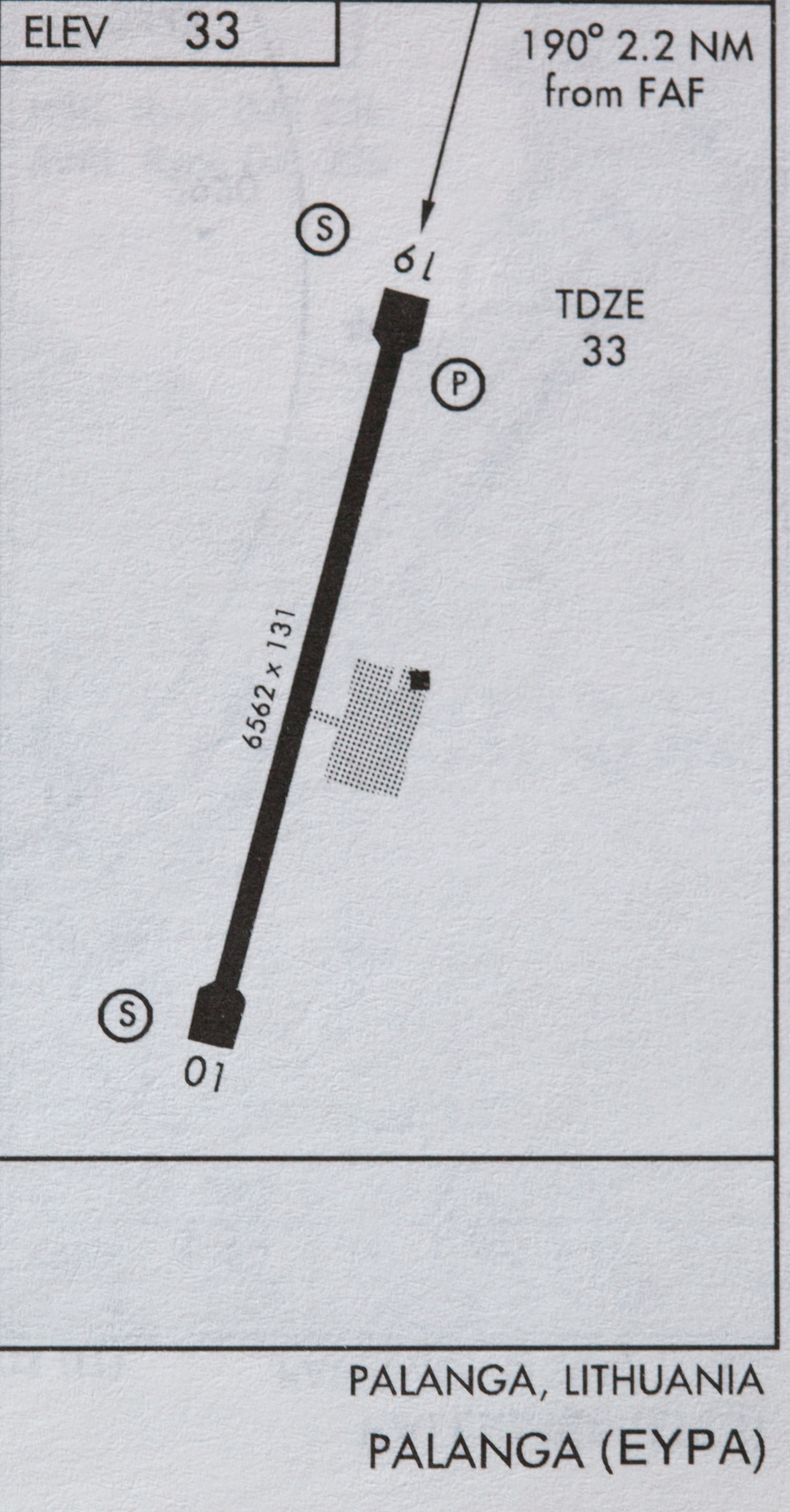

- Location of airport in Lithuania

Runways
Direction	Length		Surface
Direction	ft	m	Surface
01/19	7,478	2,280	Asphalt (45 m or 148 ft wide)

Statistics (2019)
- Number of Passengers: 338,309
- Passenger change 18–19: ▲6.8%
- Aircraft movements: 5,167
- Movement change 18–19: ▲11.8%
- Cargo (tonnes): 5,811
- Cargo change 18–19: ▼83.5%
- Source: Lithuanian Airports, 2020

Palanga International Airport ((IATA: PLQ, ICAO: EYPA) Lithuanian: Tarptautinis Palangos oro uostas) is a regional international airport located near the resort town Palanga at the Baltic Sea. It is the third largest airport in Lithuania and focuses on short and mid-range routes to European destinations. It serves the Lithuanian Baltic sea resorts of Palanga and the city of Klaipėda, and parts of Samogitia and western Latvia.

== History ==
=== Foundation and early years ===
Palanga Airport started operations in 1937 at a site 7 kilometres (4.3 mi) east of the current terminal, near the Palanga-Darbėnai road. The Lithuanian Air Force pilots were trained there. In 1939, the first scheduled airline service in Lithuania began operating on Kaunas – Palanga route. During the Soviet occupation, the airport was used by the Soviet Air Force. The new air strip and facilities at the current site first appeared during the post-World War II period. In 1963, the airport was converted to a civilian airport. In 1991, Palanga Airport was re-registered as a national airport owned and run by the state.

Since 1993, the number of passengers passing through the airport has been increasing annually. Between 1994 and 1997, the passenger terminal was renovated. Passenger services and luggage handling was modernized to comply with the requirements of the International Civil Aviation Organization (ICAO). Between 1994–1995, the flight control center was refurbished. In 1996–1997 the runway surface, and in 1998 the airport apron and taxiways were renovated. Since 1997, the airport joined the major international aviation organization ACI (Airports Council International).

=== Development since 2000 ===
After Lithuania became a member of the European Union, passengers in 2004 increased more than 60% in comparison with that of 2003.

Infrastructure improvements continued in 2007 with the construction of North terminal to expand the terminals' area by 2,000 m^{2} (22,000 sq ft) as well as to comply with Schengen border crossing regimen. In June–October 2007 the runway 01/19 was expanded to 2,280 m × 45 m (7,480 ft × 148 ft) along with installation of LIH (high intensity) lighting and embedding the runway centerline lights. The facility expansion completed in 2007 has made long-range route servicing a possibility. Over two hundred people are employed by the airport facilities.

== Terminals ==
Two adjacent terminals connected by short walkways and a transit area serve the airport:

- The South Terminal was built in the seventies and modernized in the late nineties. It has been serving as the check-in area for all flights. It also houses airline offices and cafe/bar facilities.
- The new North Terminal opened on 26 October 2007, with 2,000 m^{2} (21,528 sq ft) of space, to augment airport capabilities to serve arrivals and departures to and from non-Schengen zone countries.

Because of one-level terminal buildings layout where both departures and arrivals are handled on the ground floor level, there are no jet bridges at the airport. Passengers are transported to and from the aircraft by specialized shuttles.

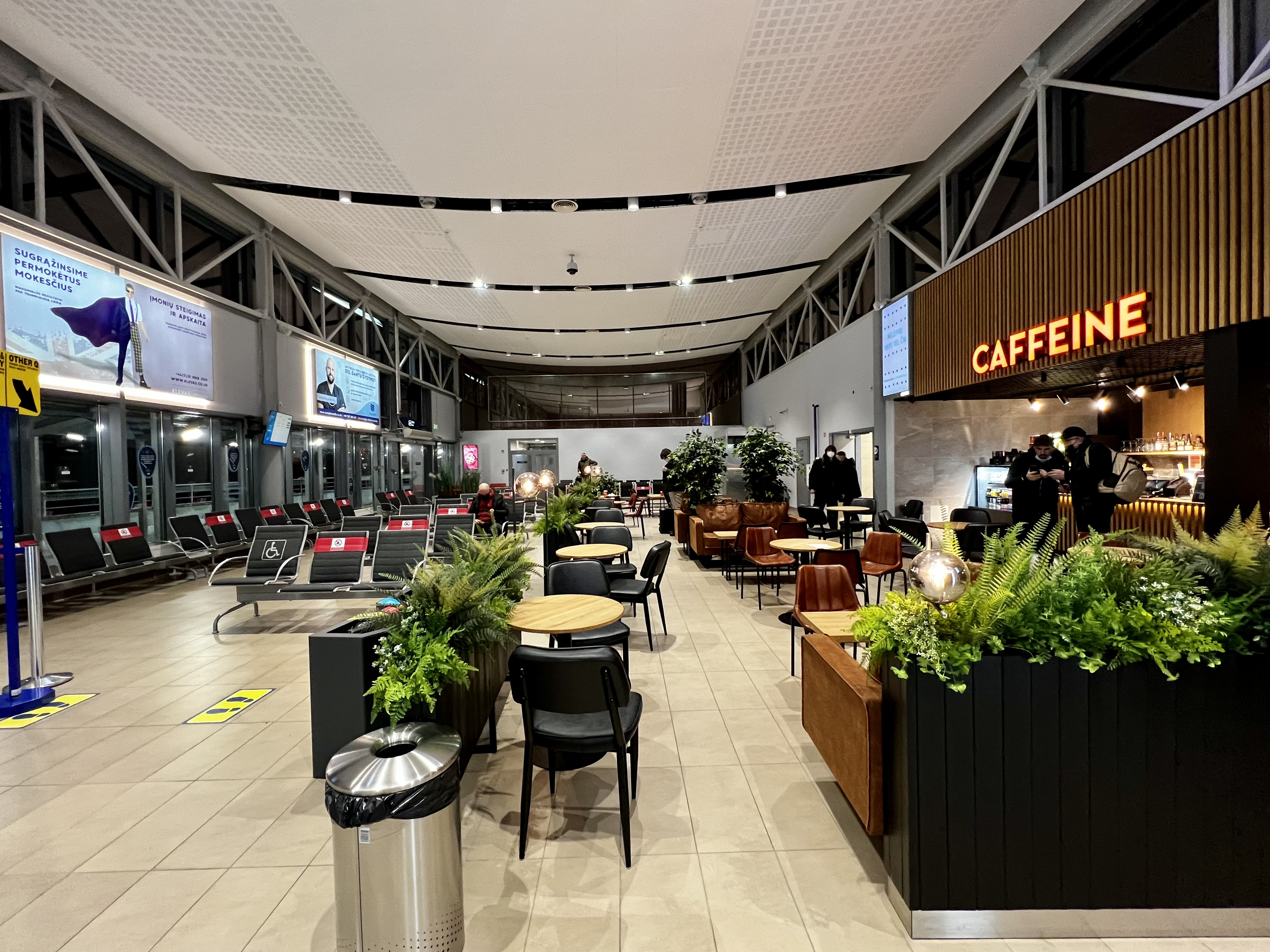
Non-Schengen Departure Area

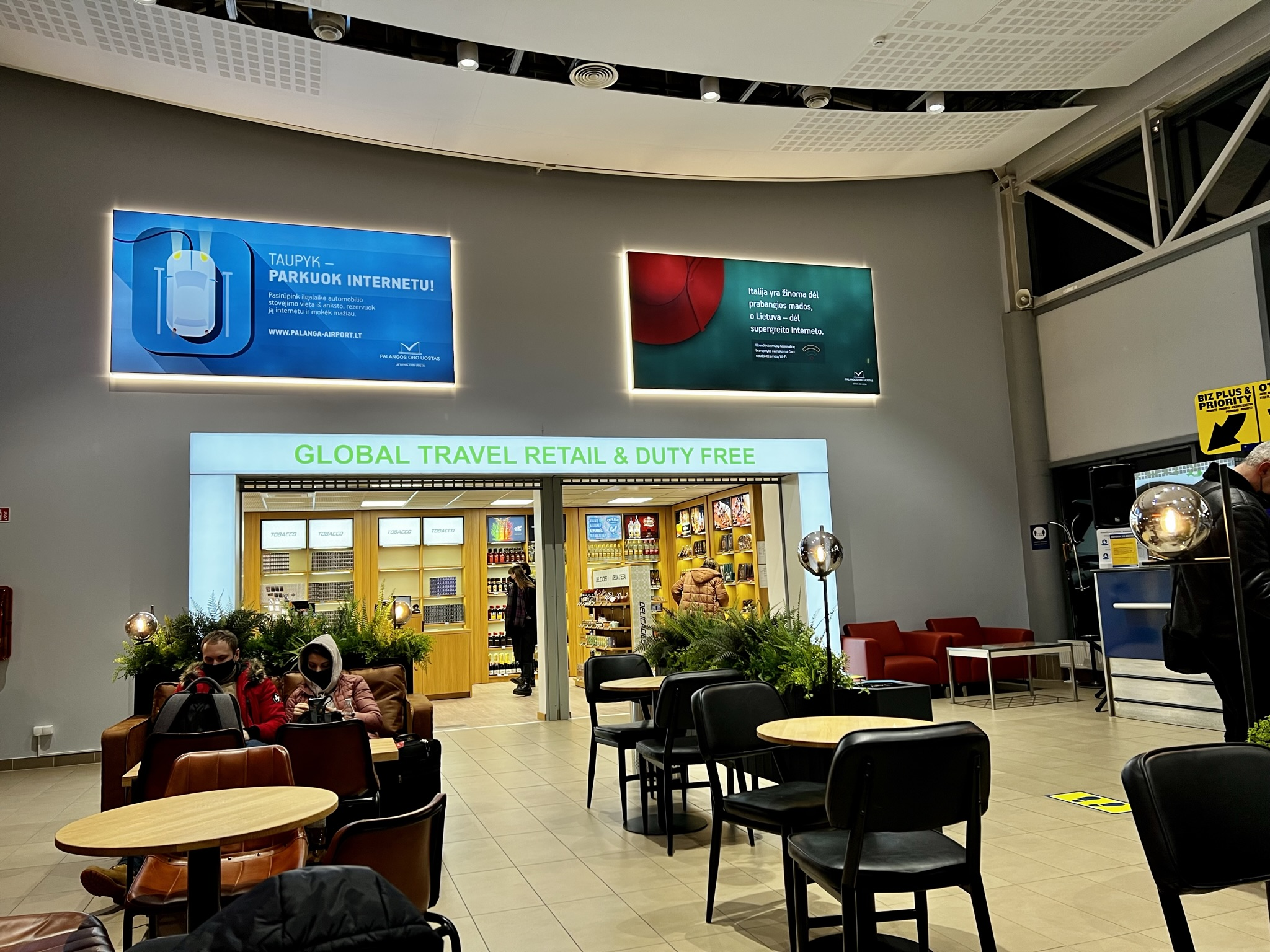
Duty Free Shop

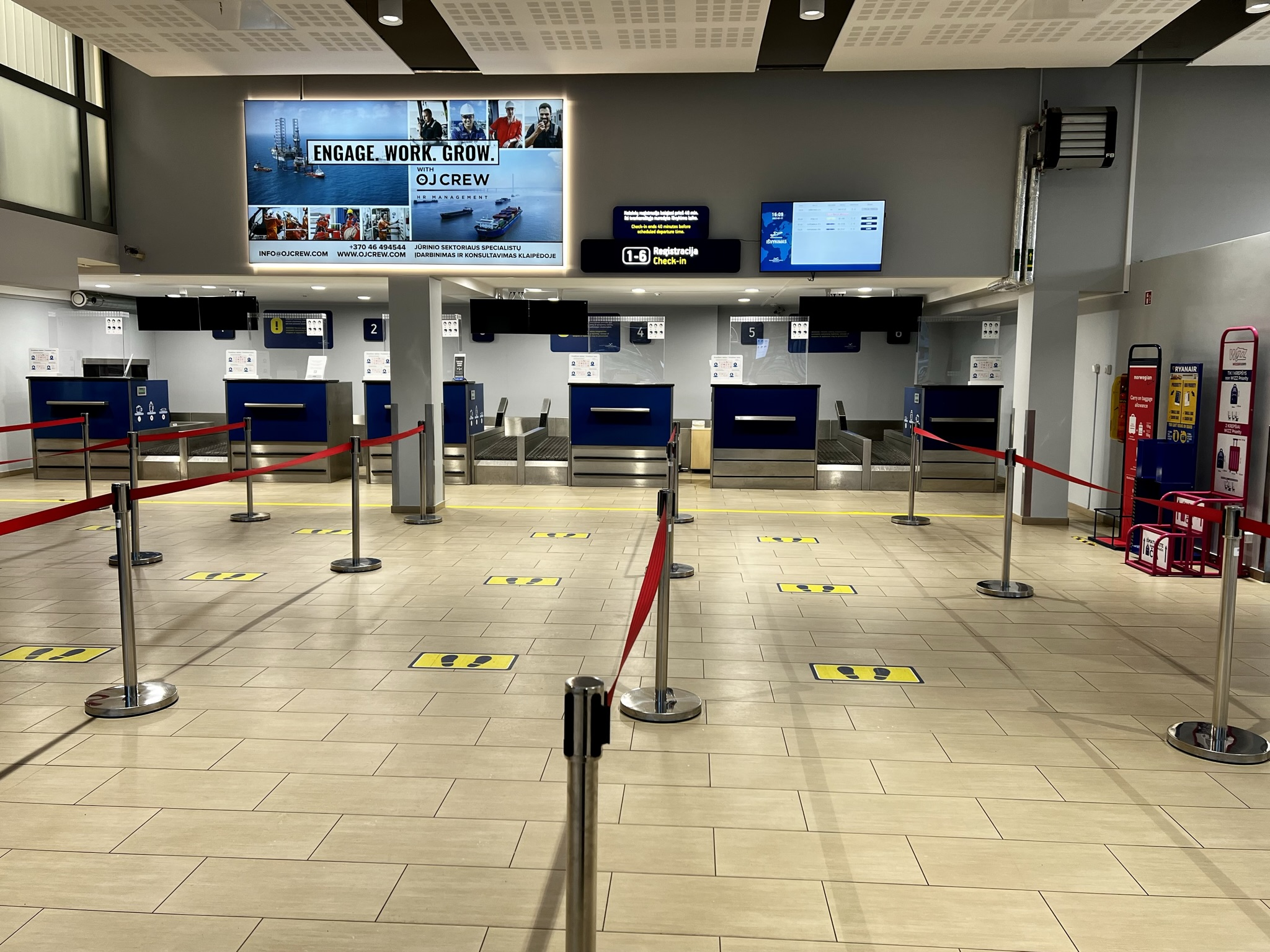
Check-in Area

== Airlines and destinations ==
The following airlines operate regular scheduled and charter flights at Palanga:

Airlines	Destinations
airBaltic	Amsterdam, Riga
Mavi Gök Airlines	Seasonal Charter: Antalya
Norwegian Air Shuttle	Bergen, Oslo
Ryanair	London–Stansted
Scandinavian Airlines	Copenhagen
SkyUp Airlines	Seasonal charter: Sharm El Sheikh
Wizz Air	Oslo

== Ground transportation ==
- Highway A13 connects the airport with southern Palanga (7 km) and Klaipėda (32 km)
- Highway A13 connects the airport with northern Liepāja (63 km)
- A public bus links the airport with Palanga and Klaipeda coach bus stations.
- Scandinavian Airlines passengers are serviced by shuttle bus operating between Klaipėda and the airport.

== See also ==
- List of the busiest airports in the Baltic states
