= Ruhnu Parish =

Municipality of Estonia

Coordinates: 57°48′N 23°15′E

Ruhnu Parish Ruhnu vald
- Municipality of Estonia
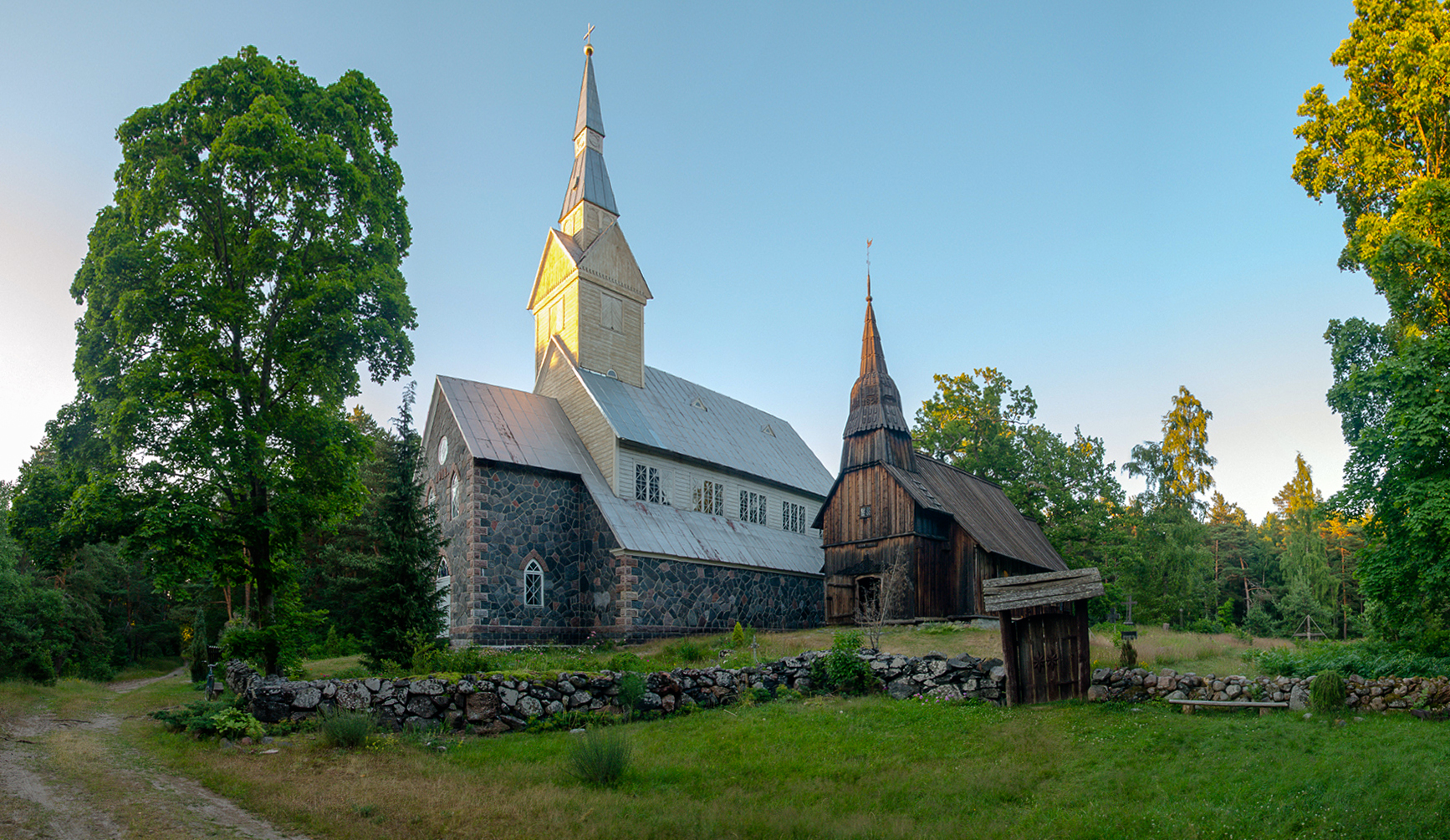
- The new and old churches in Ruhnu village

- Flag Coat of arms

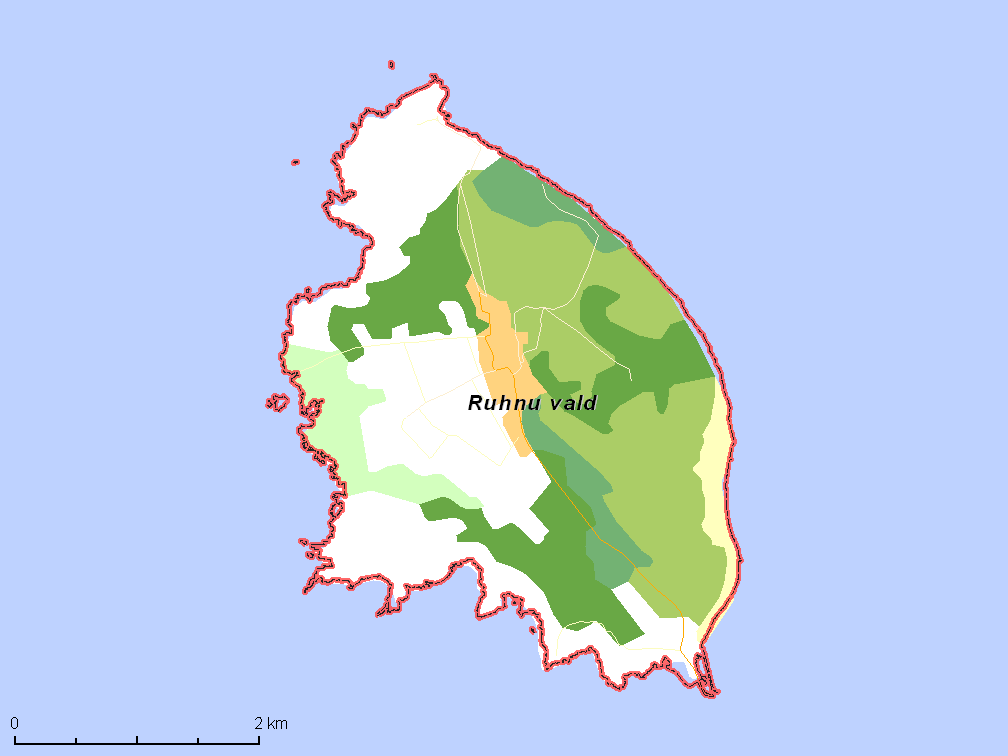
- Map of Ruhnu Parish
- Country: Estonia
- County: Saare County
- Administrative centre: Ruhnu village

Area
  - Total: 11.9 km^{2} (4.6 sq mi)

Population (2018)
  - Total: 141
  - Density: 11.8/km^{2} (30.7/sq mi)
- Time zone: UTC+2 (EET)
  - Summer (DST): UTC+3 (EEST)
- ISO 3166 code: EE-689
- Website: www.ruhnu.ee

Ruhnu Parish (Estonian: Ruhnu vald) is a municipality in Saare County, Estonia. It encompasses the island of Ruhnu in the Gulf of Riga, together with a number of uninhabited islets. Its population is the smallest of any of Estonia's 79 municipalities, the parish being exempt from the usual minimum population size of 5000. There are 60 permanent inhabitants during winter time; in summer the number increases to 150. In 2015 the parish council approved Ado Tuuga's designs for the municipality's flag and coat of arms.

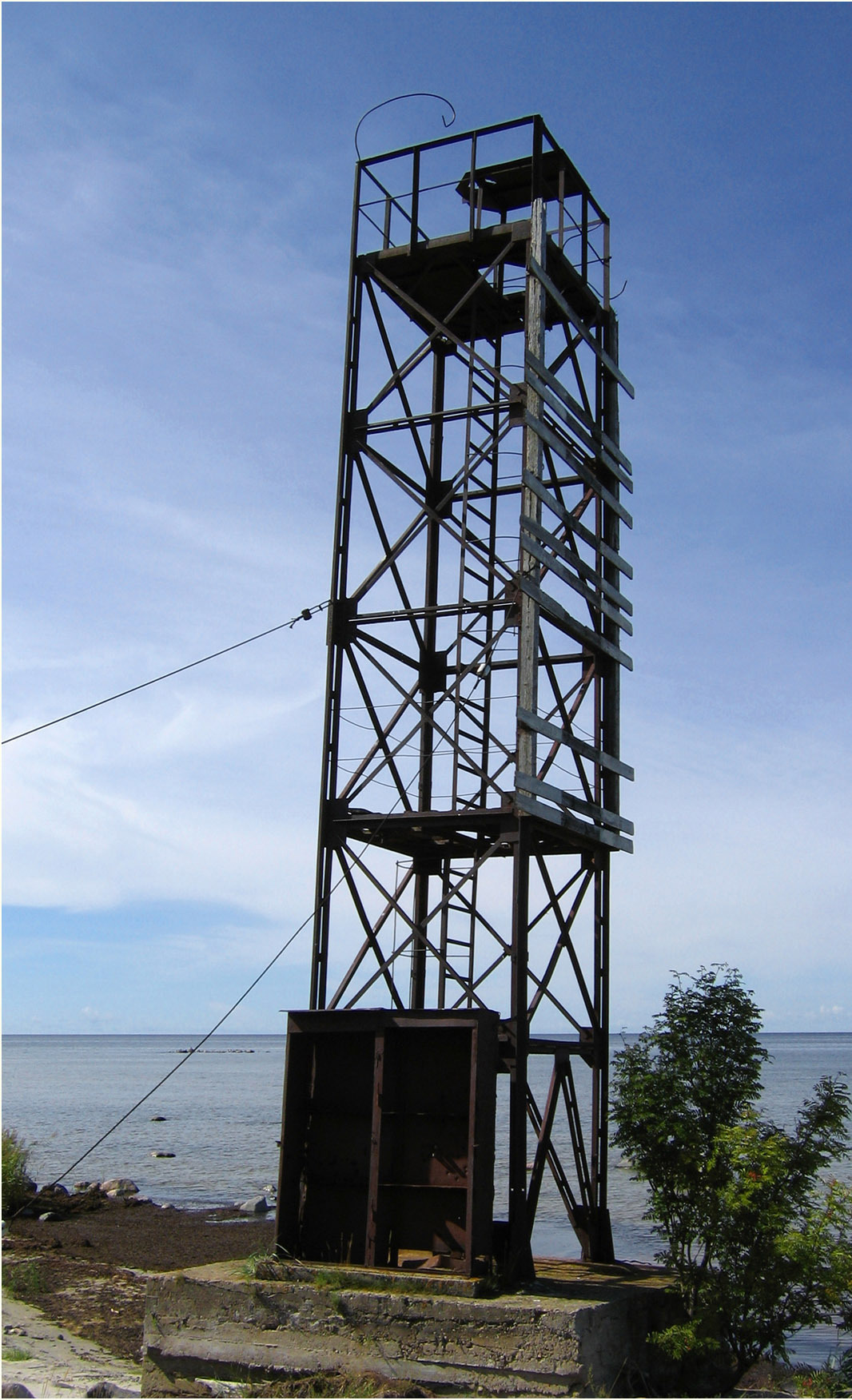
Kuunsi beacon.

The parish has only one village, Ruhnu village, in the centre of the island. There is a school, museum, library, two shops, two churches, first-aid point and local marine rescue team. In the southern part of the island near Ringsu cape, there is a weather station, airfield, diesel electric power station, harbour and cultural centre. In 2018, a 150 kilowatt solar power plant was completed near the airfield. Following the reconstruction of a wind turbine, renewables will account for more than half of the electricity produced on the island.

Ruhnu rural municipality was formed on 19 December 1991. Of all the parishes in Estonia, it has one of the biggest percentages of young people under the age of 29, and the smallest percentage of people older than 65. The biggest employer is the public sector, with tourism also increasing. Six families are active in agriculture - beekeeping, cattle and sheep farming and arable crops such as oats and barley.

60% of the land in Ruhnu Parish is currently in the ownership of Swedish citizens, the descendants of the pre-war ethnic Swedish population.

Ruhnu was part of Saaremaa district until 1950 when the Soviet authorities transferred it to Pärnu district. It was again assigned to Saaremaa in 1986. In 2016 Estonian Public Broadcasting reported the possibility of Ruhnu Parish returning to the jurisdiction of Pärnu.

In 2013 Ruhnu's parish council discussed a proposal to merge the island's administration with the City of Tallinn.

== Photographs of Ruhnu Parish ==
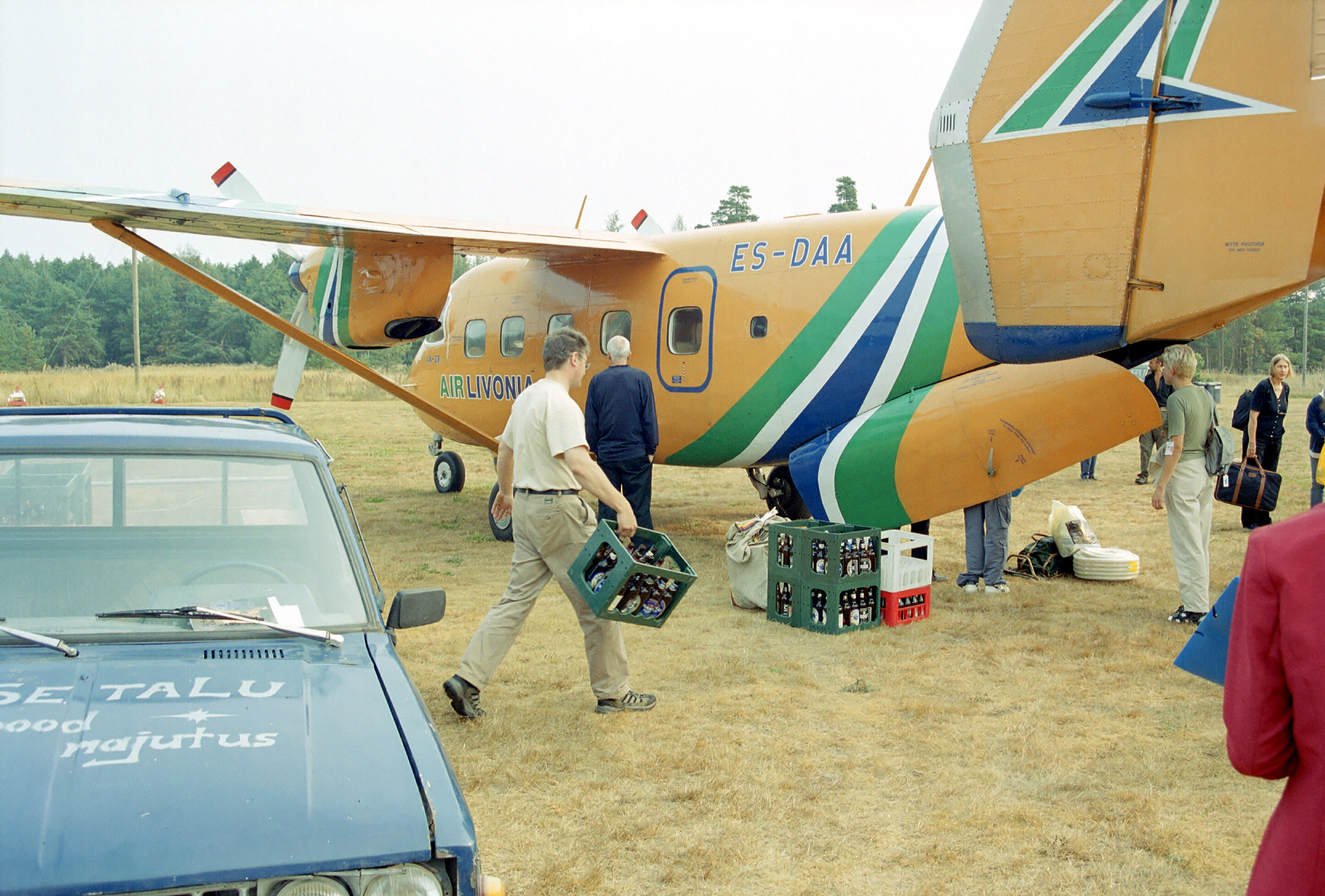
Ruhnu Airfield

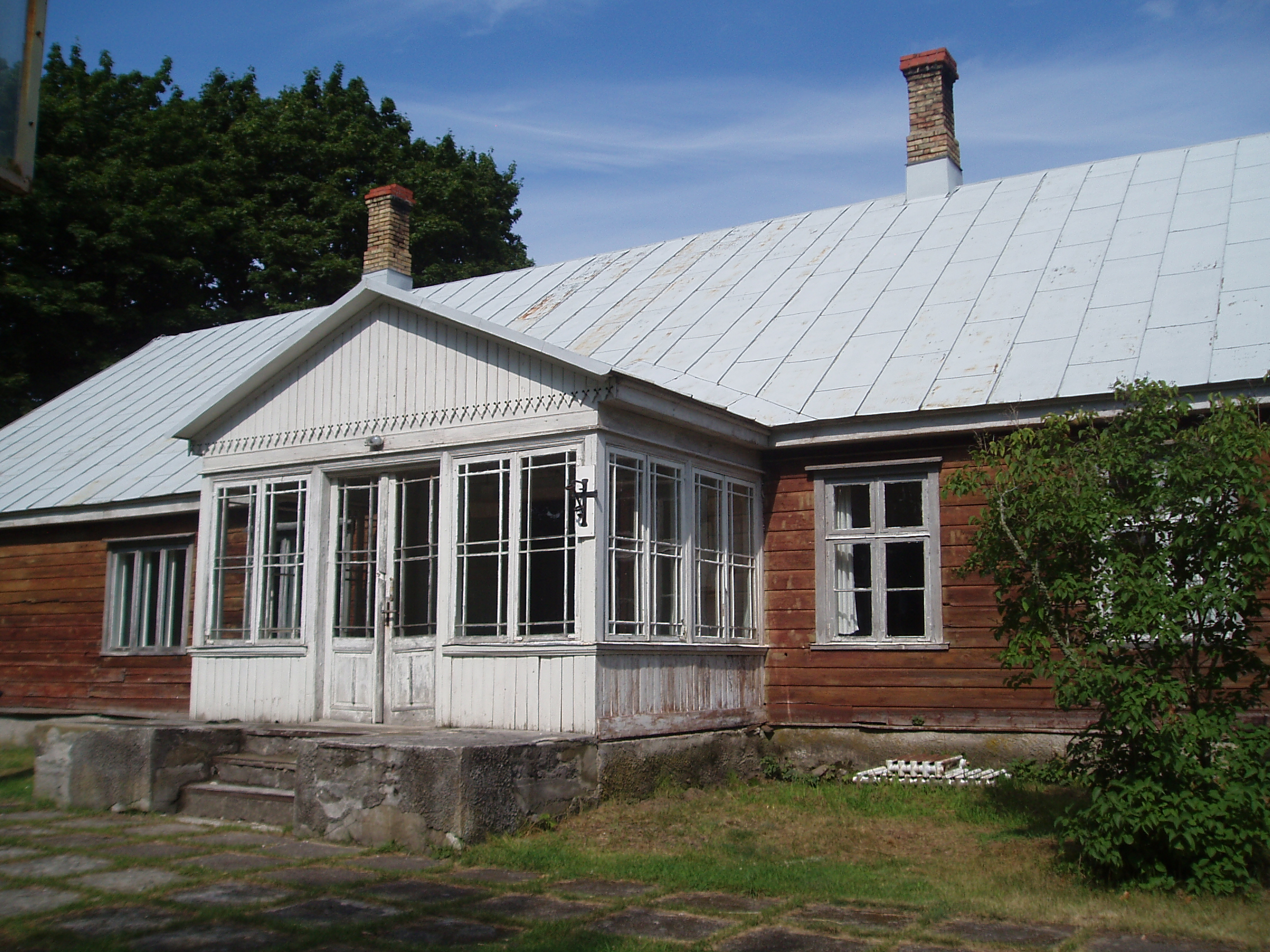
Ruhnu school

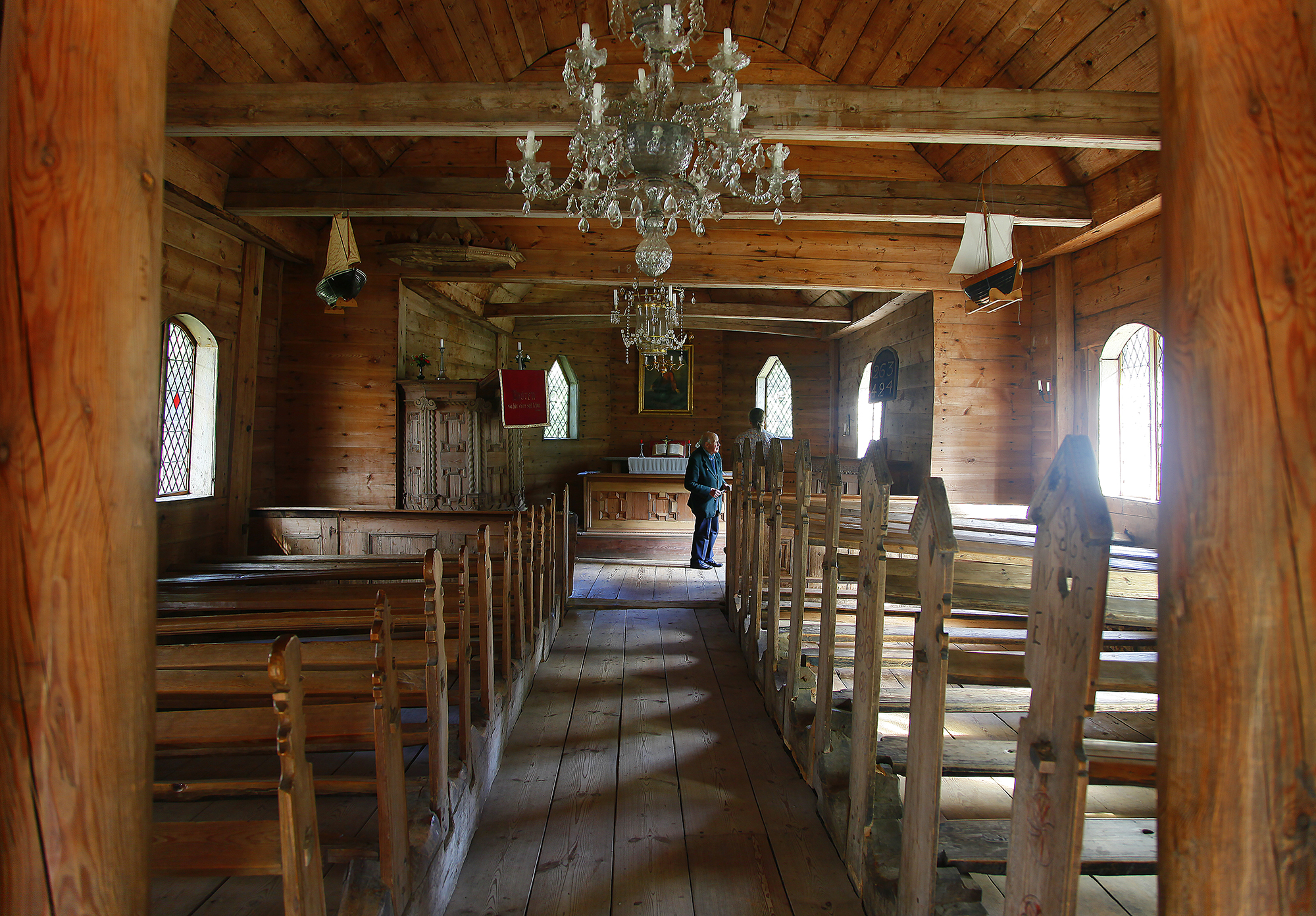
The old church
