= Pärnu Airport =

Airport in Estonia

Pärnu Airport Pärnu lennujaam
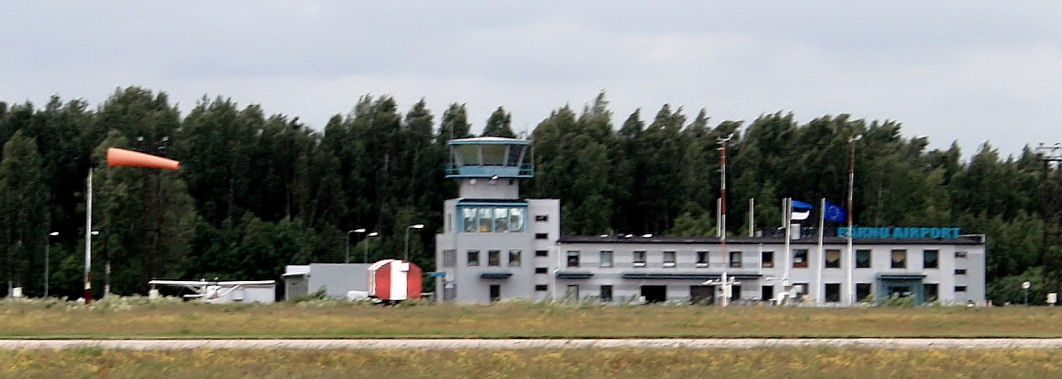
- IATA: EPU; ICAO: EEPU

Summary
- Airport type: Public
- Operator: Tallinn Airport Ltd.
- Serves: Pärnu, Estonia
- Opened: 1939
- Elevation AMSL: 40 ft / 12 m
- Coordinates: 58°25′08″N 024°28′22″E
- Website: www.parnu-airport.ee/eng

Map
- Location in Estonia

Runways
| Direction | Length | | Surface |
| Direction | m | ft | Surface |
|---|---|---|---|
| 03/21 | 1,970 | 6,463 | Asphalt |

Statistics (2025)
- Passengers: 932
- Sources: Estonian AIP

Pärnu Airport (Estonian: Pärnu lennujaam, (IATA: EPU, ICAO: EEPU)) is an airport in Estonia. The airport is situated 2.4 nautical miles (4.4 km; 2.8 mi) northwest of Pärnu.

== Overview ==
In October 1937, the Pärnu town council designated an area of 0.28 km^{2} (0.11 sq mi) for the building of an airport. Operations at the new airport began in 1939.

During the Soviet occupation, the airfield was operated by the Soviet Air Defence Force. It was an interceptor aircraft base, operated by 366th Fighter Aviation Regiment (IAP-PVO) and possibly the 655th Fightor Aviation Regiment, which flew Mikoyan-Gurevich MiG-23 aircraft from the 1970s until the 1990s.

Aeroflot used to operate Tartu-Viljandi-Pärnu-Kingissepa (now Kuressaare) services using Antonov An-2 biplanes.

In the summer of 1992, the re-constituted Estonian Ministry of Defence took over the military airport, which had drawn down its operations. On 15 October the same year it was decided to build a civil airport at the site of the old military airport. The old runway was closed on 1 July 1997, and regular flights started to use the runway that had belonged to the Soviet air defence force.

The small airline Air Livonia flew from Pärnu to Kuressaare, Kihnu and Ruhnu until 2006. In the summer of 2010, Estonian Air operated one return flight a week from Stockholm.

The airport is often visited by private aircraft from Scandinavia and other European countries. 5,148 people travelled via Pärnu Airport in 2010. The airport was also used for charter flights from Finland and Sweden until 2014, when the deteriorating condition of the runway meant that it was no longer suitable for larger aircraft. In 2016, there were proposals to overhaul and refit the airport, alongside (possibly) a brand-new terminal for handling of larger jets.

After a total of 14 months reconstruction the airport re-opened end of September 2021. Currently it hosts direct flights to Ruhnu. Recently news reported, that NyxAir of Estonia will start flights to Helsinki in May 2022.

In March 2022, Scandinavian Airlines announced that it will launch summer seasonal flights between Pärnu and Stockholm Arlanda Airport. The direct route would be operated twice-weekly, starting from the 25th of June 2022.

== Airlines and destinations ==
| Airlines | Destinations |
|---|---|
| Diamond Sky | Seasonal: Kuressaare, Ruhnu |

== Statistics ==
List of the busiest airports in the Baltic states
