= Kuressaare Airport =

Estonian airport

Kuressaare Airport Kuressaare lennujaam
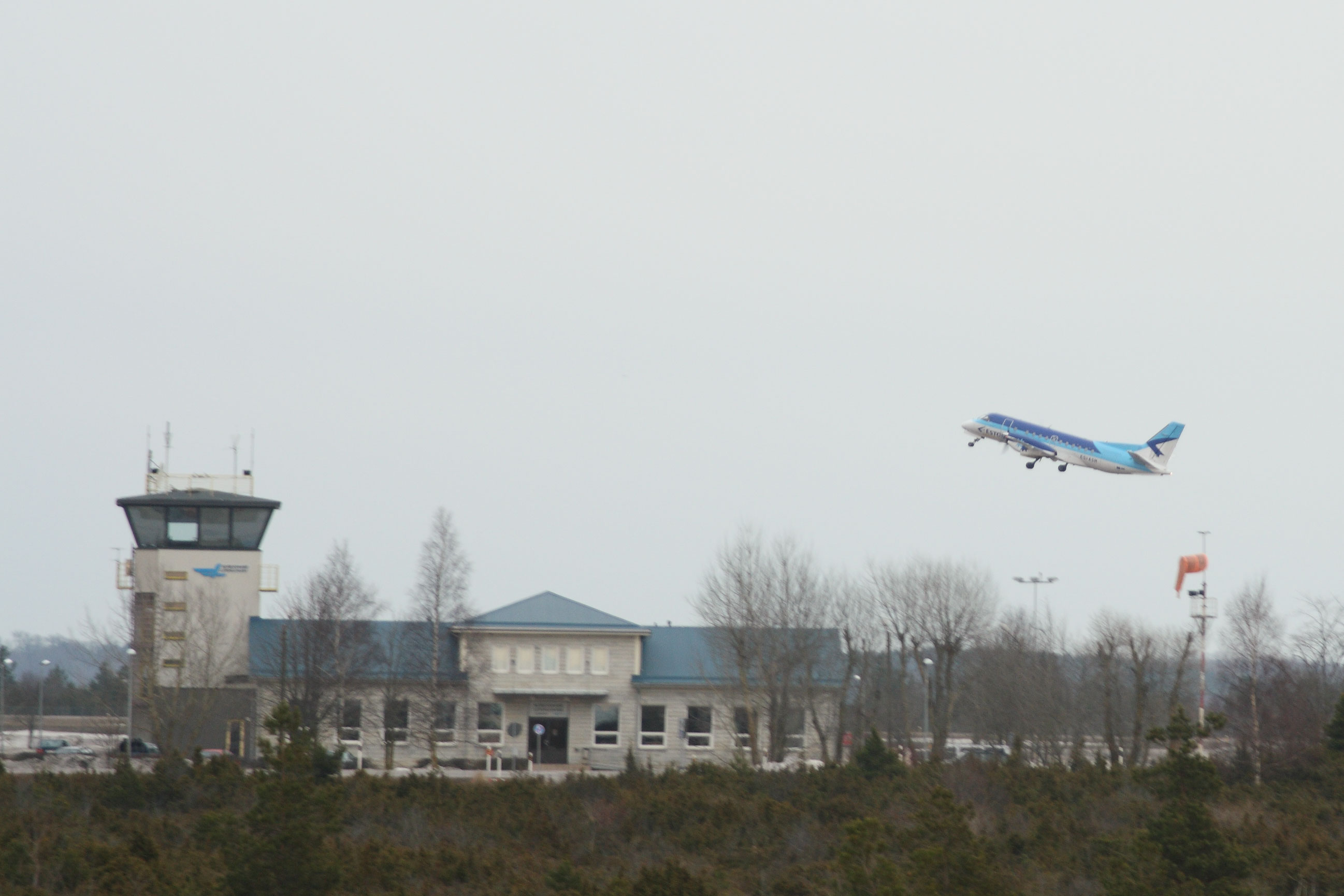
- IATA: URE; ICAO: EEKE

Summary
- Airport type: Public
- Operator: AS Tallinna Lennujaam
- Serves: Kuressaare, Estonia
- Opened: 6 March 1945; 81 years ago
- Elevation AMSL: 14 ft (4.3 m)
- Coordinates: 58°13′48″N 022°30′34″E
- Website: www.airport.ee

Map
- Location in Europe Location of Kuressaare in the Baltic Sea region Location in Estonia

Runways
Direction	Length		Surface
Direction	m	ft	Surface
17/35	2,000	6,562	Asphalt
05/23	799	2,621	Asphalt

Statistics (2025)
- Passengers: 34,776
- Sources: Estonian AIP

Kuressaare Airport (Estonian: Kuressaare lennujaam, IATA: URE, ICAO: EEKE) is an airport in Estonia. The airport is situated about 3 km southeast of Kuressaare town centre in Saaremaa Municipality.

== Overview ==
The first runway was built in the last half of the 1930s. The airport was opened officially on 6 March 1945. The air traffic increased during the proceeding years and between 1949 and 1953 there were between 10 and 14 daily flights between Kuressaare and Tallinn. During this period, around 400 passengers flew to or from Kuressaare daily. The airport did not get electricity until 1958. The present terminal building was built in 1962. The second runway 05/23 was built in 1976 and in 1999 the main runway was lengthened. The terminal building was modernised in 2007.

The airport is owned by AS Tallinna Lennujaam, which also owns Ruhnu Airfield.

19,702 passengers travelled via Kuressaare Airport in 2010.

== Airlines and destinations ==
Airlines	Destinations
Diamond Sky	Pärnu, Ruhnu
Finnair	Seasonal: Helsinki
NyxAir	Tallinn

== Statistics ==
- List of the busiest airports in the Baltic states
