= Ruhnu Airfield =

Airfield in Estonia

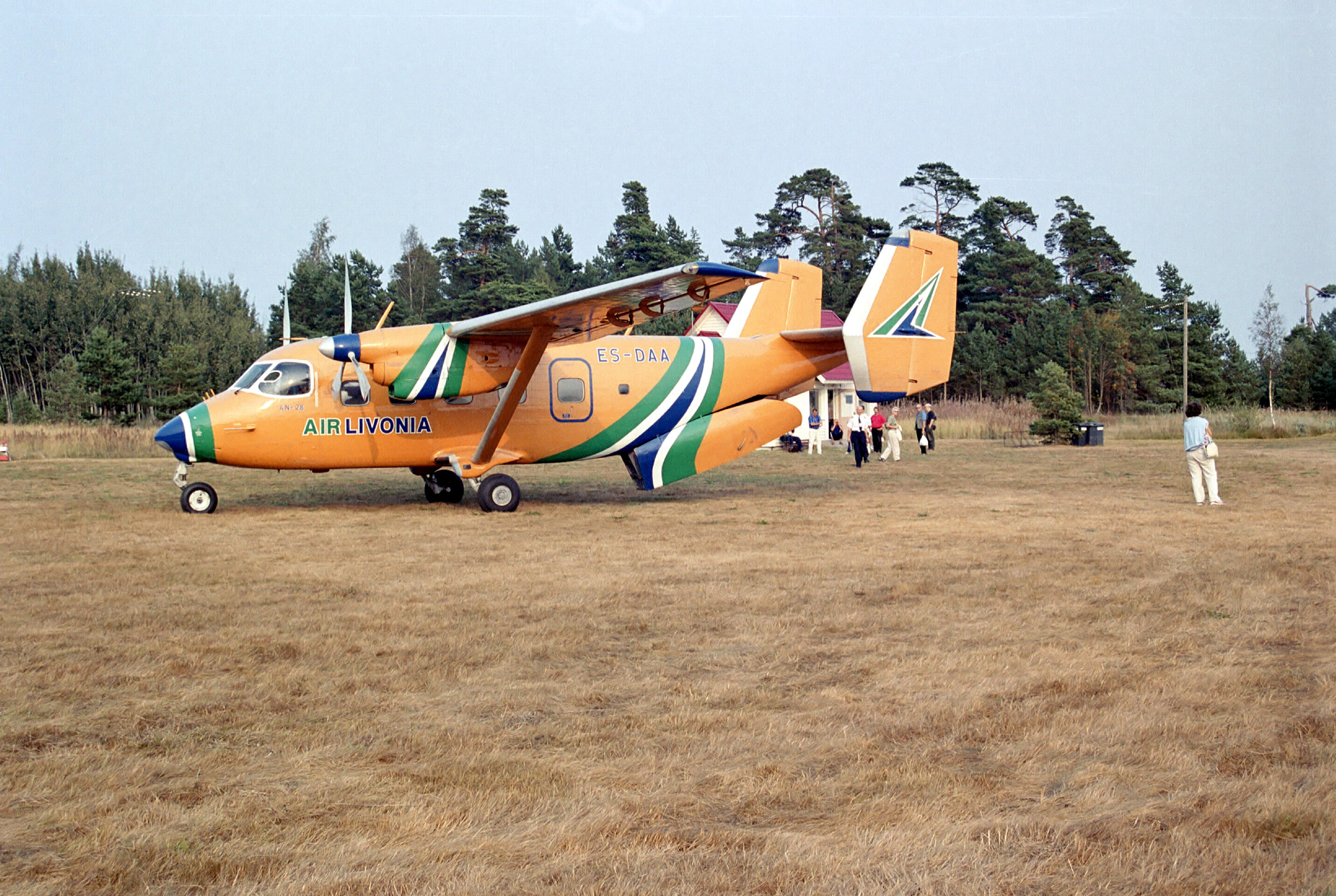
- IATA: none; ICAO: EERU

Summary
- Airport type: Public
- Operator: AS Tallinna Lennujaam
- Serves: Ruhnu
- Location: Ringsu
- Elevation AMSL: 10 ft (3.0 m)
- Coordinates: 57°47′02″N 023°15′58″E

Map
- Location in Estonia

Runways
Direction	Length		Surface
Direction	m	ft	Surface
13/31	600	1,969	Reinforced grass

Statistics (2024)
- Passengers: 1,472
- Cargo (tonnes): ?
- Sources: Estonian AIP

Ruhnu Airfield (ICAO: EERU) is an airfield on Ruhnu island in Estonia. The airfield is situated to the south of the island, 37 nautical miles (69 km; 43 mi) southeast of Kuressaare, near the village of Ringsu. It is owned by the same company as Kuressaare Airport, located 70 km further north, on Saaremaa island.

In 2024 the Estonian Ministry of Regional Affairs and Agriculture stated that scheduled flights to Ruhnu will be discontinued when a year-round ferry service starts with a new ice class vessel.

== Overview ==
The airfield has one runway, 13/31 that is 600 m × 20 m (1,969 ft × 66 ft) with a grass surface. The runway has no landing lights. The airfield is managed by AS Tallinna Lennujaam.

== Airlines and destinations ==
The following airlines operate domestic scheduled flights at Ruhnu Airfield:

Airlines	Destinations
Diamond Sky	Seasonal: Kuressaare, Pärnu
