= List of companies based in Tallinn =

This is a list of companies in Tallinn, Estonia. Tallinn is the capital city of Estonia.

== Companies based in Tallinn ==
Name	Type	Location within Tallinn	Notes
Admiral Markets	Finance	Kesklinn	
Alexela	Oil	Kesklinn	
Apranga Group	Retail	Kesklinn	
Bank of Estonia	Central bank	Kesklinn	
Bigbank	Bank	Kesklinn	
Bolt	Transportation	Kesklinn	
CoinsPaid	Cryptocurrency	Kesklinn	
Eesti Rahvusringhääling	Radio and television	Kesklinn	
Elisa Eesti	Telecommunication	Kristiine	Largest telecommunication company in Estonia
Ericsson Eesti	Telecommunication	Lasnamäe	
Espak	Retail	Kesklinn	Largest home improvement retailer in Estonia
EuroPark Estonia	Parking	Kesklinn	
forms.app	Data Collection	Kesklinn	
Forum Cinemas Estonia	Entertainment	Kesklinn	
IM Arvutid	Retail	Kristiine	
L'Oreal Baltic Eesti	Beauty	Lasnamäe	
LHV	Bank	Kesklinn	
Liviko	Food and beverages	Kesklinn	Largest producer of alcoholic beverages in Estonia
Luminor	Bank	Kesklinn	
Lux Express	Transportation	Kesklinn	
Magnetic MRO	Maintenance	Lasnamäe	
Nasdaq Tallinn	Finance	Kesklinn	Largest stock market in Estonia
Olerex	Oil	Kesklinn	
Olympic Entertainment Group	Entertainment	Kesklinn	
Playtech Estonia	Entertainment	Lasnamäe	
Postimees Group	Media	Kesklinn	
SEB Pank	Bank	Kesklinn	
Swedbank Eesti	Bank	Kesklinn	
Tallink	Shipping	Kesklinn	
Tallinn Airport GH	Transportation	Lasnamäe	Operator of the largest airport in Estonia
Tallinna Kaubamaja Grupp	Retail	Kesklinn	
Telia Eesti	Telecommunication	Kristiine	
Toyota Baltic	Automotive	Kesklinn	
Ülemiste Center	Retail	Lasnamäe	Operator of the largest mall in Estonia
