= Tallinn Airport =

Airport in Tallinn, Estonia

Tallinn Airport Tallinna lennujaam

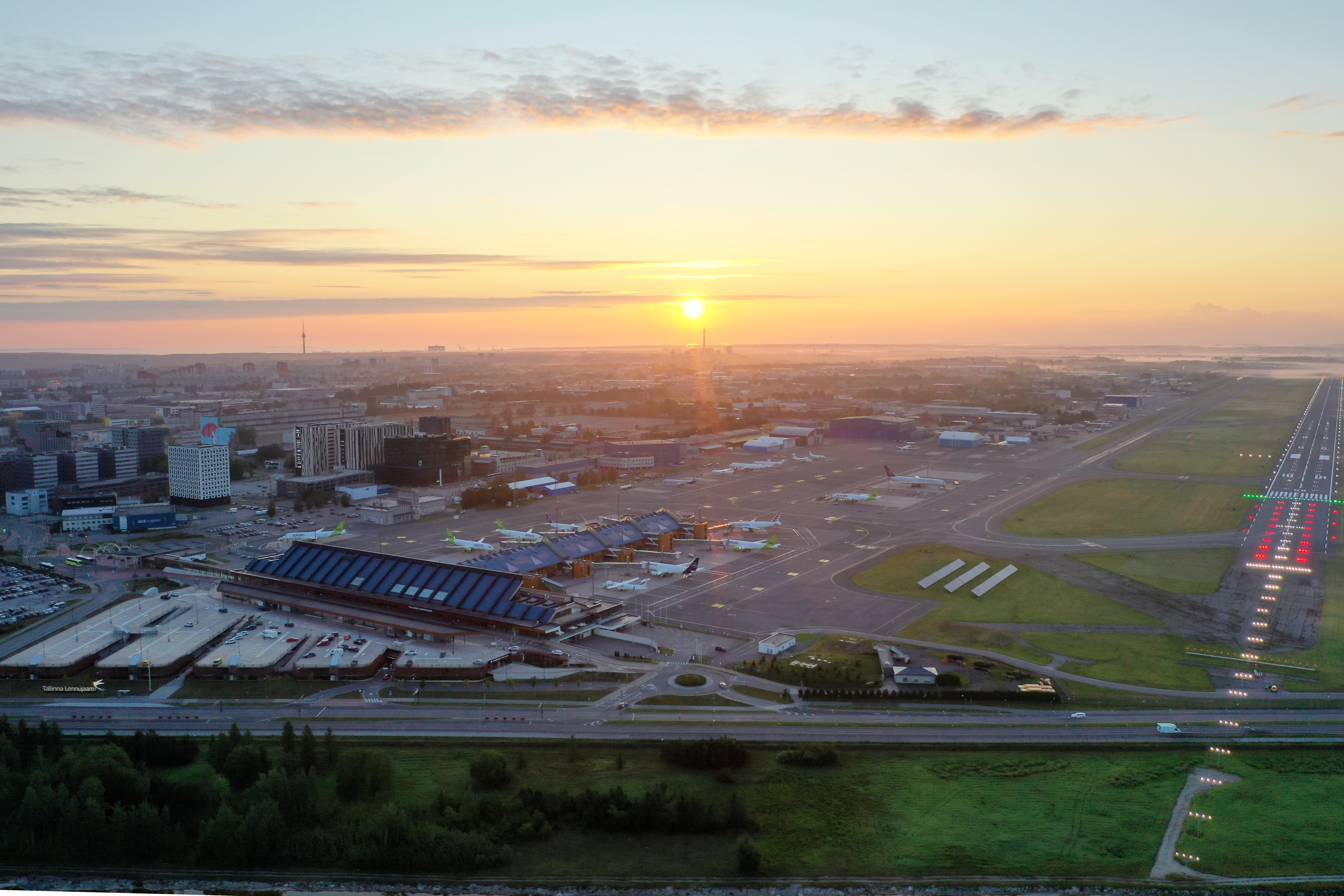
- IATA: TLL; ICAO: EETN

Summary
- Airport type: Public
- Owner/Operator: AS Tallinna Lennujaam
- Serves: Tallinn, Estonia
- Opened: 1936; 90 years ago
- Hub for: airBaltic; Airest; NyxAir
- Elevation AMSL: 131 ft (40 m)
- Coordinates: 59°24′48″N 024°49′57″E
- Website: airport.ee

Maps
- Location in Europe Location of Tallinn Airport in the Baltic Sea region Location in Estonia
- Location in Tallinn

Runways
Direction	Length		Surface
Direction	m	ft	Surface
08/26	3,480	11,417	Asphalt/concrete

Statistics (2024)
- Total passengers: ▲3,491,799
- Passenger change 23-24: ▲17,9%
- International Passengers (2022): ▲2,684,997
- Domestic Passengers (2024): ▲87,636
- Aircraft movements (2024): ▲42,403
- Movements change 21-22: ▲43%
- Cargo (tonnes) 2024: ▲9,909
- Cargo change 23-24: ▲13.2%
- Sources: Estonian AIP; Statistics from Tallinn Airport Ltd.

Tallinn Airport (IATA: TLL, ICAO: EETN) is the largest international airport in Estonia. The airport is also officially called Lennart Meri Tallinn Airport (Estonian: Lennart Meri Tallinna lennujaam) after the former president of Estonia Lennart Meri.

The airport is located 2.7 nautical miles (5.0 km; 3.1 mi) southeast of the city centre of Estonian capital Tallinn, on the eastern shore of Lake Ülemiste. Until 2009, it was known as Tallinn Ülemiste Airport. The airport has a single asphalt/concrete runway, 08/26, that is 3,480 m × 45 m (11,417 ft × 148 ft) and large enough to handle wide-bodied aircraft such as the Boeing 747, six taxiways and seventeen terminal gates.

== History ==
=== Early development ===
Prior to the establishment of the present airport in Ülemiste area, Lasnamäe Airfield was the primary airport of Tallinn, serving as a base for Aeronaut airline. After Aeronaut went bankrupt in 1928, air service was continued by Deruluft, which used Nehatu instead, 12 km (7.5 mi) from the centre of Tallinn. The first seaplane harbour on the shores of Lake Ülemiste was built 1928 to 1929 in order to serve Finnish seaplanes. The use of this harbour ended in World War II. On 26 March 1929 Riigikogu passed an expropriation act in order to establish a public airport. 10 ha (25 acres) of land was expropriated from Dvigatel joint-stock company and another 22 ha (54 acres) was expropriated from descendants of Vagner. 10 million sents were paid to land-owners as indemnity. Land leveling and renovation works took another 5 million sents.

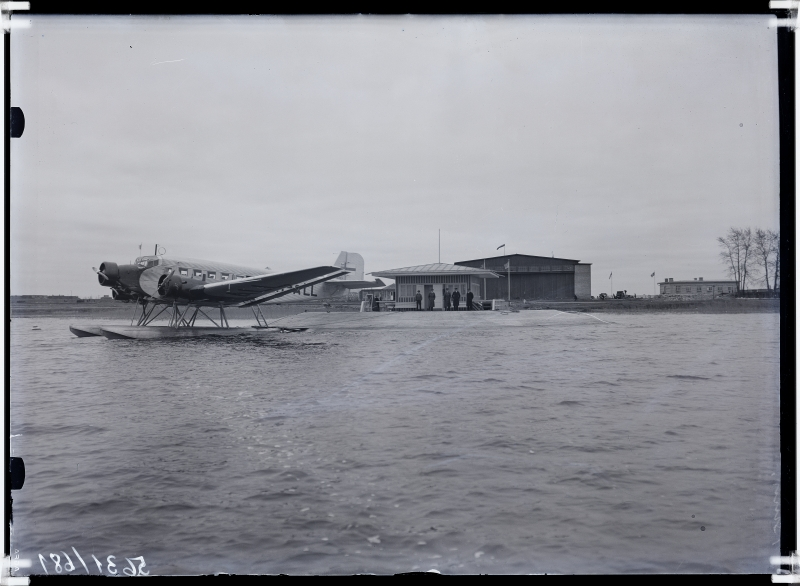
A floatplane version of Ju 52/3m (Kaleva OH-ALL) of Aero O/Y by the lakeside ramp of Tallinn Airport (1936)

The building of Tallinn Airport started on 16 November 1931, and the first test landing was commenced by captain Reissar piloting Estonian Air Force Avro 594 Avian, tail number 120. The airport was opened officially on 20 September 1936, although it had been operational a good while before the official opening. LOT Polish Airlines, which commenced its first passenger flight from Tallinn on 18 August 1932 with Fokker F.VIIb/3m from Lasnamäe Airfield, later relocated the flights to Tallinn Airport and in 1935 the airport had 6 arrivals and departures on average every day. In April 1935 a ramp for seaplanes was built on a shore of Lake Ülemiste, together with a small arch bridge and a customs office, which allowed seaplanes to be relocated from a sea port. The same year the airport administration building was erected, which also served initially as a waiting place for travellers. The total cost of the whole airport project, including the cost of building flight hangars, was 25 million sents.

As the very first runways had soft surface, it made them unavailable for takeoffs and landings during spring and autumn seasons. Therefore, only seaplanes stationed at Lake Ülemiste were able to carry out flights, and during winter months, it was possible to use the frozen surface of the lake as a runway for small airplanes. The concrete paved runways of the first stage, inaugurated together with the opening of the airport, were about 40 metres (130 ft) wide and 300 metres (980 ft) long. As they were arranged in a form of a triangle, they allowed takeoffs and landings in six directions. These were the first concrete-paved runway in Estonia, it was needed some 5,396 cubic metres (190,600 cu ft) of stone, 4,100 cubic metres (144,800 cu ft) of construction aggregate and 137 t (135 long tons; 151 short tons) of cement to construct them.

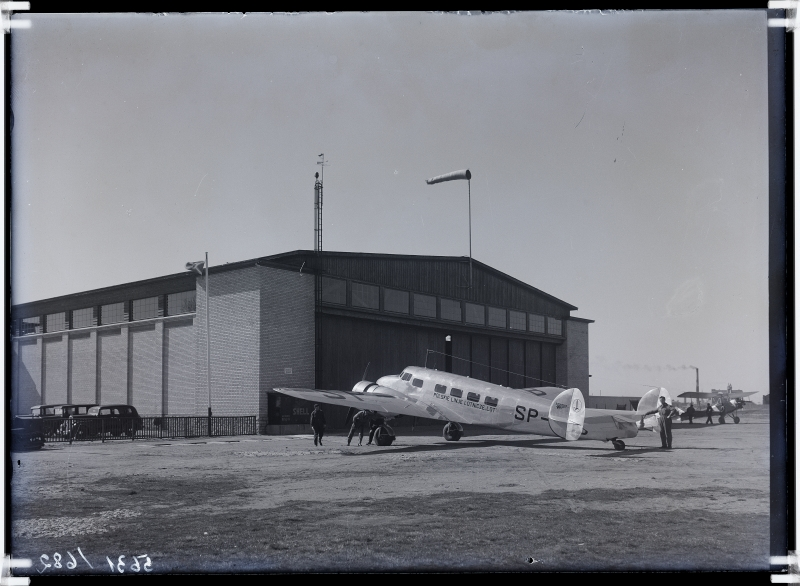
LOT Lockheed Model 10A Electra in front of a flight hangar at Tallinn Airport in the 1930s.

In addition, 3 km (1.9 mi) of pipeworks was laid for drainage purposes. Before World War II, Tallinn Airport had regular connections to abroad by at least Aerotransport (now part of the SAS Group), Deutsche Luft Hansa, LOT and the Finnish company Aero (now Finnair). On 5 April 1937 the Helsinki-Tallinn-Warsaw-Jerusalem route was inaugurated by Mr. Bobkowski, the assistant of the Polish Minister of Transport. The length of the route was 3,187-kilometre (1,721 nmi) and the journey time was 34 hours. Passengers and cargo numbers grew quickly, from 4,100 passengers and 6,730 kg (14,837 lb) of cargo in 1933 to 11,892 passengers and 14,726 kg (32,465 lb) of cargo in 1937. Preparation and design works for a new passenger terminal started in 1938. 14 various projects were submitted for the architectural contest of the new terminal building, with the one from the architect Artur Jürvetson winning the contest in February the same year. The construction costs were estimated at 300 thousand Estonian kroons. The first airplane of then the flag carrier of Estonia, AGO, arrived at Tallinn Airport on 5 October 1939, flying the route Dessau–Königsberg–Tallinn.

As Estonia was occupied by Soviet Union, on 22 July 1940 the order was made by Soviet occupation authorities to transfer the airport to Soviet Air Forces. All aircraft, which were at the airport at that time, including interned Polish Lockheed 14, two Junkers Ju 52 of AGO and PTO-4 trainer aircraft of Estonian Airclub, were relocated to Lasnamäe Airfield.

During the German occupation, regular international connections were announced on 16 October and already restored on 15 November 1941, when Deutsche Lufthansa and Aero O/Y started the route Helsinki-Tallinn-Riga-Königsberg-Berlin. From 1942 to 1944 Sonderstaffel Buschmann was based at Tallinn Airport.

=== Soviet period ===
Between 1945 and 1989, Aeroflot was the only airline that served Tallinn Airport.

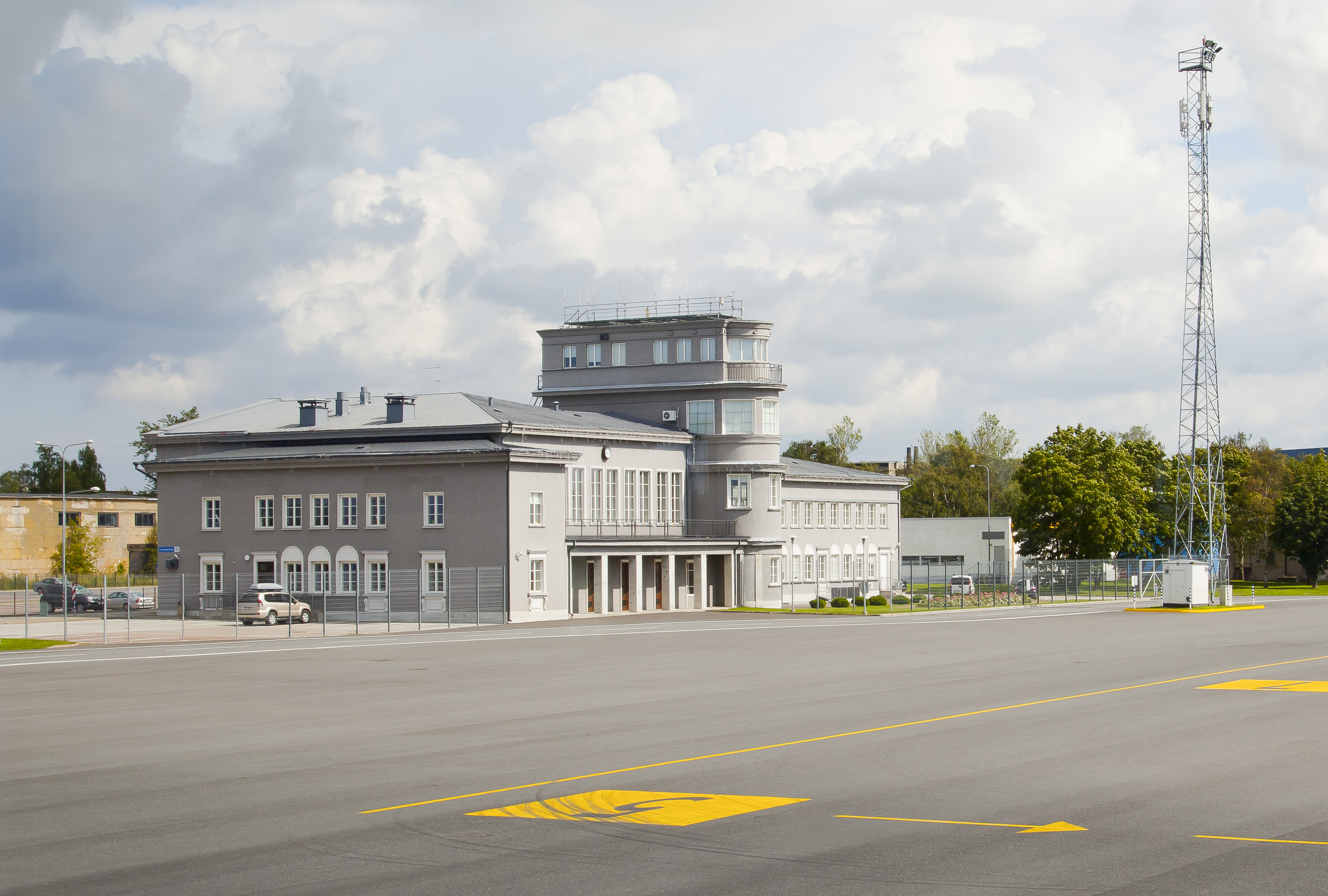
The old terminal, used from 1954 to 1980.

The construction of the new passenger terminal, which was put on hold due to war, resumed. The building, which was redesigned in accordance with the Stalinist architecture, was finished in 1954 and commissioned on 7 November 1955. Regular flights with jet aircraft began on 2 October 1962 with a maiden passenger flight from Moscow with a Tu-124, which was the latest Soviet airliner. As the terminal built in 1954 became obsolete and unable to cope with growing airport traffic, the construction of the current terminal building began in 1976 and the terminal was opened in 1980, prior to the 1980 Summer Olympics sailing event, which was held in the city. The architect of the new terminal was Mihhail Piskov, who took visual inspiration from traditional Estonian housebarns, and the interior designer was Maile Grünberg. The runway was also lengthened then. The first foreign airline since World War II to operate regular flights from Tallinn was SAS, whose first flight to the airport took place on 25 November 1989.

=== Modern development ===
The construction works of the first cargo terminal (Cargo 1), located in the middle of future cargo area on the north side of the airport, were carried out from September 1997 until March 1998. The passenger terminal building was completely modernised in 1999, increasing its capacity to 1.4 million passengers per year, and after that greatly expanded in 2008. The growing demand for extra space for cargo operations, created a situation where there was a need for cargo terminal expansion, Cargo 2. In order to meet the growing demand for new cargo facilities at Tallinn Airport, the number of cargo terminals was later expanded to four. In the year 2012, a new aircraft maintenance hangar was opened and the number of passengers passed two million mark the first time in the history of the airport. On 11 January 2013, the airport was accepted into Airport Carbon Accreditation emission managing and reduction programme by ACI. The year 2013 saw the introduction of an automatic border control system and athestart of construction of a new business aviation hangar complex.

==== 2008 expansion ====
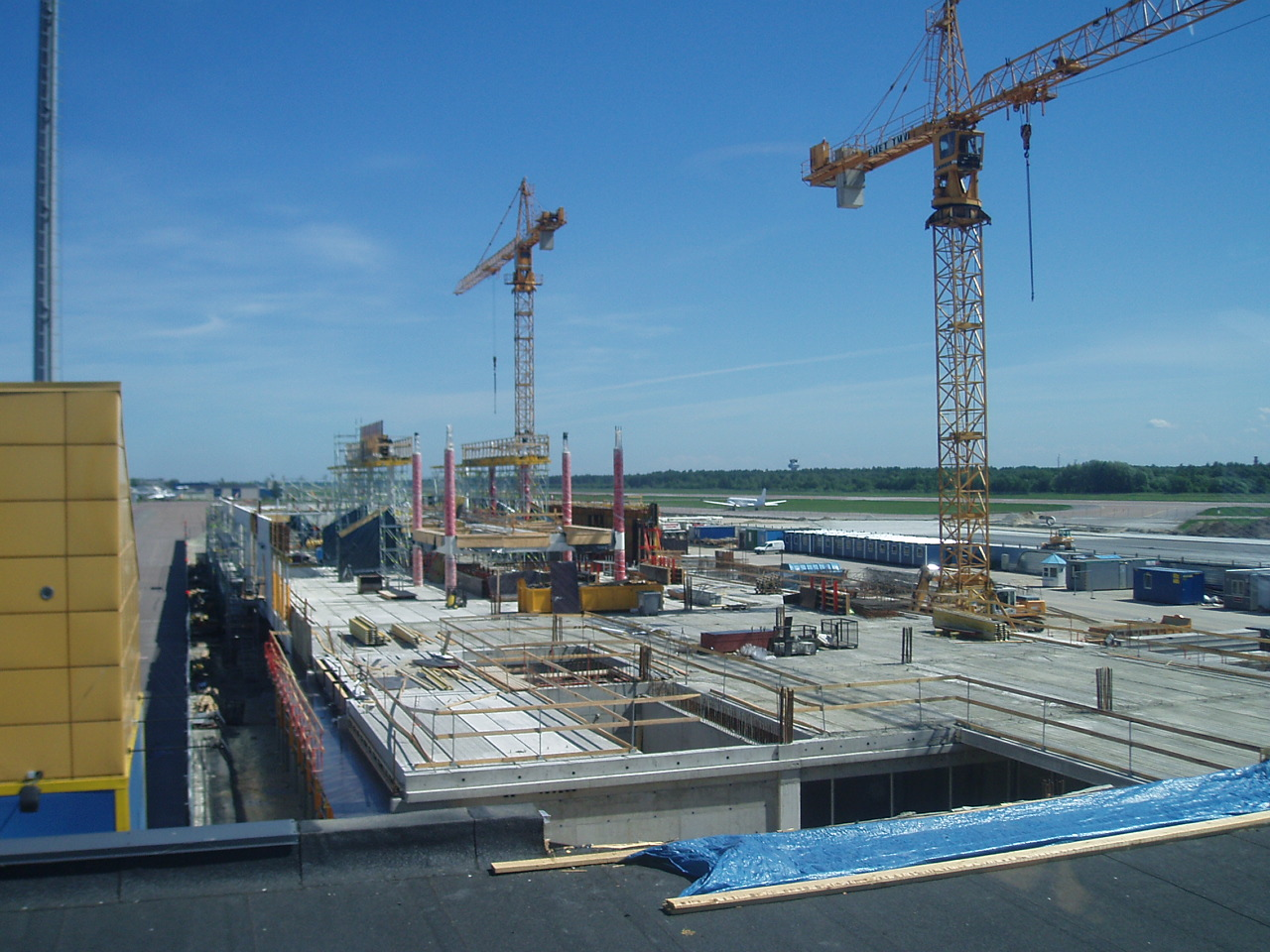
Construction of the terminal expansion.

The airport underwent a large expansion project between January 2006 and September 2008. The existing terminal was expanded by 35,000 m^{2} (376,700 sq ft) and the architects of the project were Jean Marie Bonnard, Pia Tasa and Inge Sirkel-Suviste. The terminal was expanded in three directions, resulting in 18 new gates, separate lounges for Schengen and non-Schengen passengers, 10 new check-in desks and a new restaurant and cafes. Due to the gallery that connects all the gates and was constructed in the middle of the terminal building the terminal became T-shaped. The projecting terminal section enables a two-level traffic for international passengers. The renewed terminal has nine passenger bridges. The extensions constructed at the ends of the terminal building became additional rooms for registering for the flights and for delivering arriving luggage. Outside the terminal, the apron was refurbished and expanded and a new taxiway was added. The new terminal allows the airport to handle twice as many passengers as it could handle before. The renovated terminal received the award "Concrete Building of the Year 2008" by the Estonian Concrete Association.

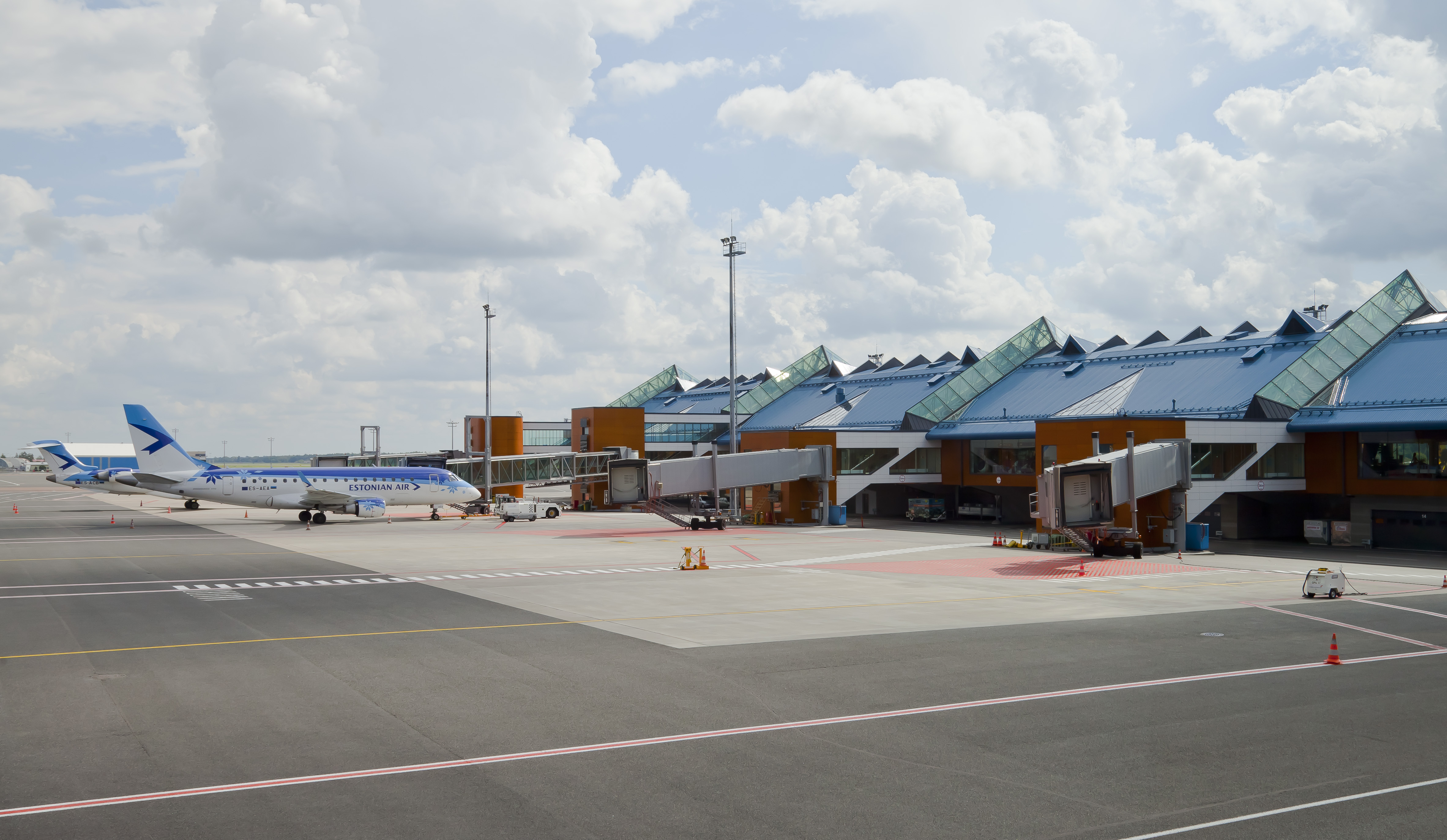
The terminal after its expansion (August 2012).

==== Renaming ====
After the death of former president of Estonia Lennart Meri on 14 March 2006, journalist Argo Ideon from Eesti Ekspress proposed to honour the president's memory by naming Tallinn Airport after him – "Tallinna Lennart Meri Rahvusvaheline Lennujaam" (Lennart Meri International Airport), drawing parallels with John F. Kennedy International Airport, Charles de Gaulle Airport, Sabiha Gökçen International Airport etc. Ideon's article also mentioned the fact that Meri himself had shown concern for the condition of the then Soviet-era construction (in one memorable case Meri, having arrived from Japan, led the group of journalists that were expecting him, to the airport's toilets to do the interview there, in order to point out the shoddy condition of the facilities).

The name change was discussed at a board meeting on 29 March 2006, and on the opening of the new terminal on 19 September 2008, Prime Minister Andrus Ansip officially announced the renaming would take place in March 2009.

==== Baltic Sea cruise turnarounds ====
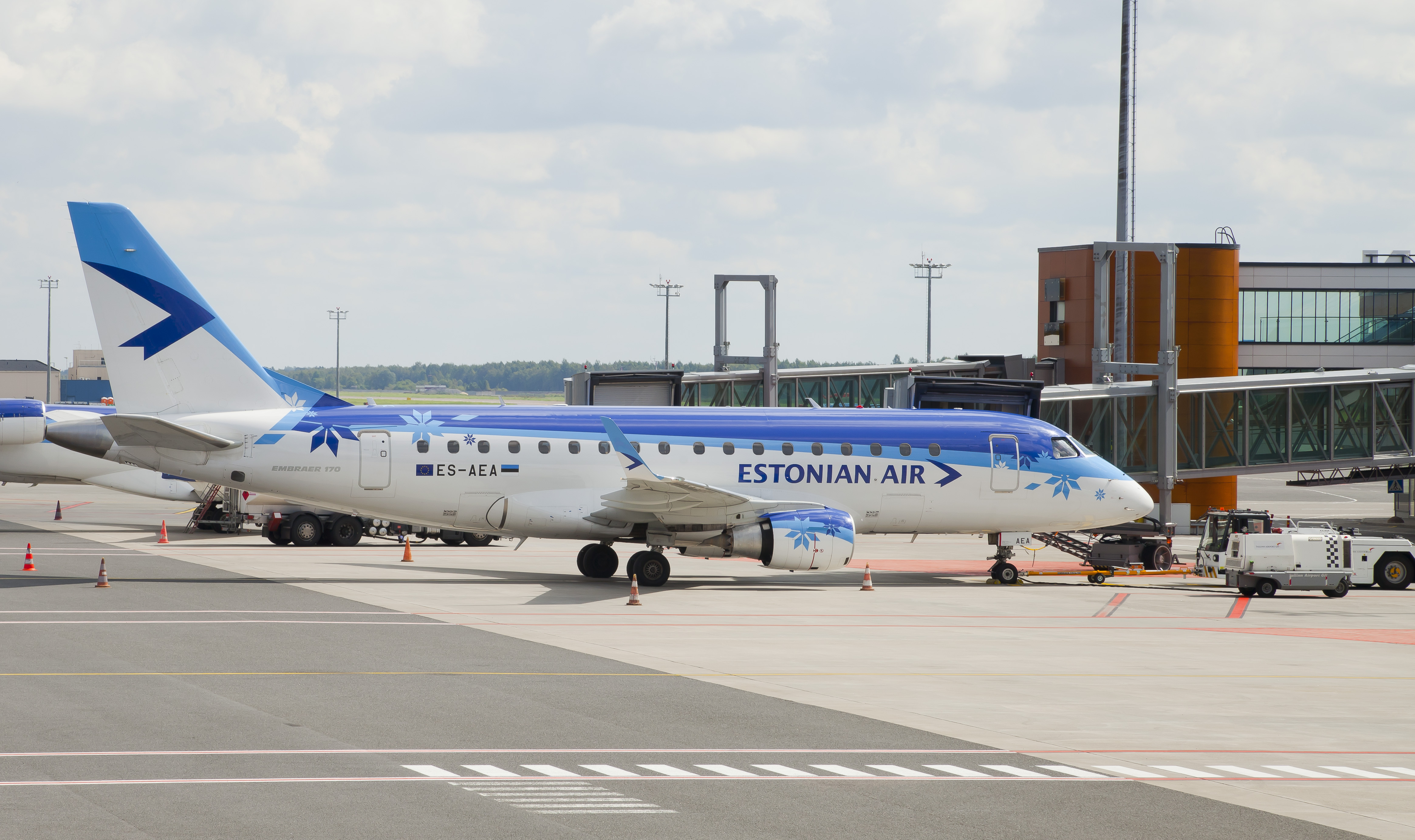
An Embraer 170 of Estonian Air at Tallinn Airport (2012).

In 2011 a new project of cruise turnarounds was launched in cooperation with Tallinn Passenger Port and Happy Cruises. More than 7,000 Spanish passengers travelled that year on charter flights to and from Tallinn Airport. As the airport is located only 5 km (3.1 mi) from the city center cruise quay, transfer time from airport to cruise ship is under an hour.

In 2012, Pullmantur Air started its charter operations from Madrid–Barajas Airport with three Airbus A321s and two to three Boeing 747s. During the summer 2012 about 16,000 tourists were transferred. The company continued operations in 2013, transferring 25,000 tourists in five turnarounds, as well as there was one partial turnaround operation for the cruise ship MS Deutschland operated by Peter Deilmann Cruises.

In 2015, cruise tourists were attended to by four airlines – Iberia, Iberia Express, Wamos Air, and Vueling. Some 5,000 passengers were expected during three turnarounds for Pullmantur Cruises cruise line. Tallinn Airport served 9,369 cruise turnaround passengers in 2015. No cruise turnarounds are expected in summer 2016 due to construction works, but the airport plans to continue them in 2017.

==== Demise of Estonian Air ====
On 7 November 2015, Estonian Air was liquidated following an adverse decision by the European Commission. This meant a significant temporary loss of business for the airport, as Estonian Air had been the largest carrier, accounting for one third of all capacity in 2014.

== Future expansion (2025–2030) ==
As of late 2025, Tallinn Airport has transitioned from its 2019 "Airport City" vision to a more immediate, phased expansion plan. This €75 million investment is the largest in the airport's history and aims to modernize the terminal to handle 5 million passengers annually by 2030. The current terminal, originally designed for 2.8 million passengers, served over 3.5 million in 2025, necessitating these upgrades to resolve critical bottlenecks in baggage handling and border control.

The project adds 16,500 m^{2} of new space and renovates 18,000 m^{2} of existing facilities across five stages:

- Stage I (2025–2026): Modernization of the check-in area and the installation of next-generation self-service bag-drop kiosks.
- Stage II (2026–2028): Construction of a new arrival area and a high-capacity automated baggage handling system. This stage also includes the addition of two new gates and expanded retail space.
- Stage III (2026–2027): Expansion of the border control area to reduce wait times for non-Schengen flights and upgrades to the non-Schengen gate areas.
- Stage IV (2029–2030): Extension and reconstruction of the security screening area, the VIP lounge, and the primary duty-free shopping zones.
- Stage V (2028): Renovation of the public-facing "open" areas of the terminal to unify the old and new architecture.

The design, led by DAGOpen and studio ARGUS, emphasizes a "homely" Estonian identity using natural wood, glass, and light-filled spaces with views of the airfield.

=== Sustainability Goals ===
The airport is on track to achieve carbon neutrality by 2030. By 2026, solar farms at five locations were already generating nearly 40% of the airport's electricity. Future plans include transitioning to 100% green grid electricity by 2027 and developing green hydrogen production capabilities using surplus solar energy.

== Recent infrastructure improvements (2016–2021) ==
Prior to the current 2030 expansion plan, several major airside and landside projects were completed:

- Runway extension: In November 2016, the airport completed the extension of runway 08/26 to 3,480 meters, making it the longest in the Baltic states. This allowed for larger long-haul aircraft and moved the runway threshold further from Lake Ülemiste to reduce noise pollution over Tallinn.
- Safety and navigation: The project included installing ILS Category II equipment, reinforcing safety areas to reduce excursion risks, and installing 100 kilometers of new cabling and 400 navigation lights.
- Parking garage: A three-story parking facility for 1,200 vehicles was opened in 2019 directly in front of the passenger terminal to accommodate the steady growth in passenger numbers.
- Terminal layout: Between 2017 and 2021, approximately €2.5 million was invested to reconfigure the existing terminal layout, improving the flow of the security area and the VIP facilities.

The 2012 proposal for a separate "Terminal 2" dedicated to low-cost carriers was ultimately scrapped in favor of the current "one-roof" expansion strategy that integrates all airline types into a single, modernized terminal.

== Facilities ==
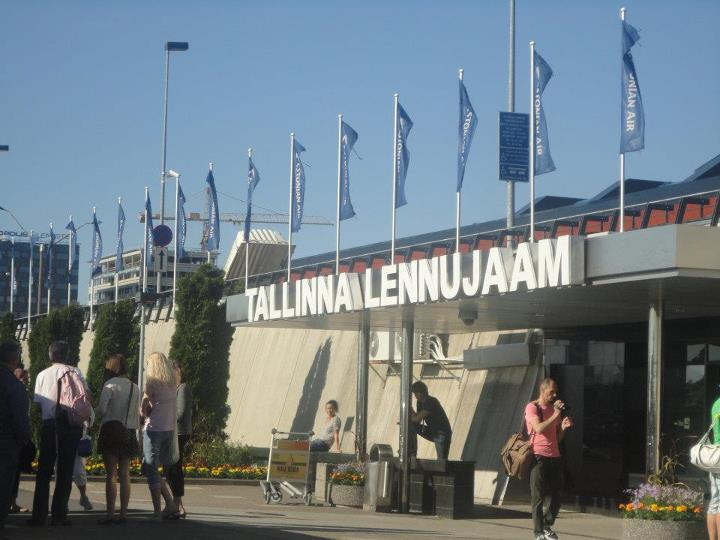
Entrance to the airport terminal building (2012)

There is one passenger terminal and four cargo terminals at the airport. These are located to the right of Runway 08's threshold, with Runway 26 being connected to the terminal segment by a parallel taxiway as long as the runway.

=== Terminal building ===
Estonian EXPO Center year-round permanent exhibition is located near the Gate 3, acting as a live advertising space where promotion representatives introduce the companies taking part in the exhibition and help finding cooperation partners in particular fields of business. The center was opened on 22 July 2010. VKG has opened an oil shale themed exposition at Gate 4 on 9 January 2013, showing the history and development of Estonian oil shale industry. The Estonian Tourist Board has opened a brand new "Visit Estonia" themed exposition at Gate 5 on 2 October 2013. The gate is divided into three parts: a children's territory with a Lotte-themed playhouse, an interactive, informative waiting area decorated with Estonian national patterns and a bridge from the gate to the airplane that introduces travellers to Estonian nature.

==== Passenger facilities ====
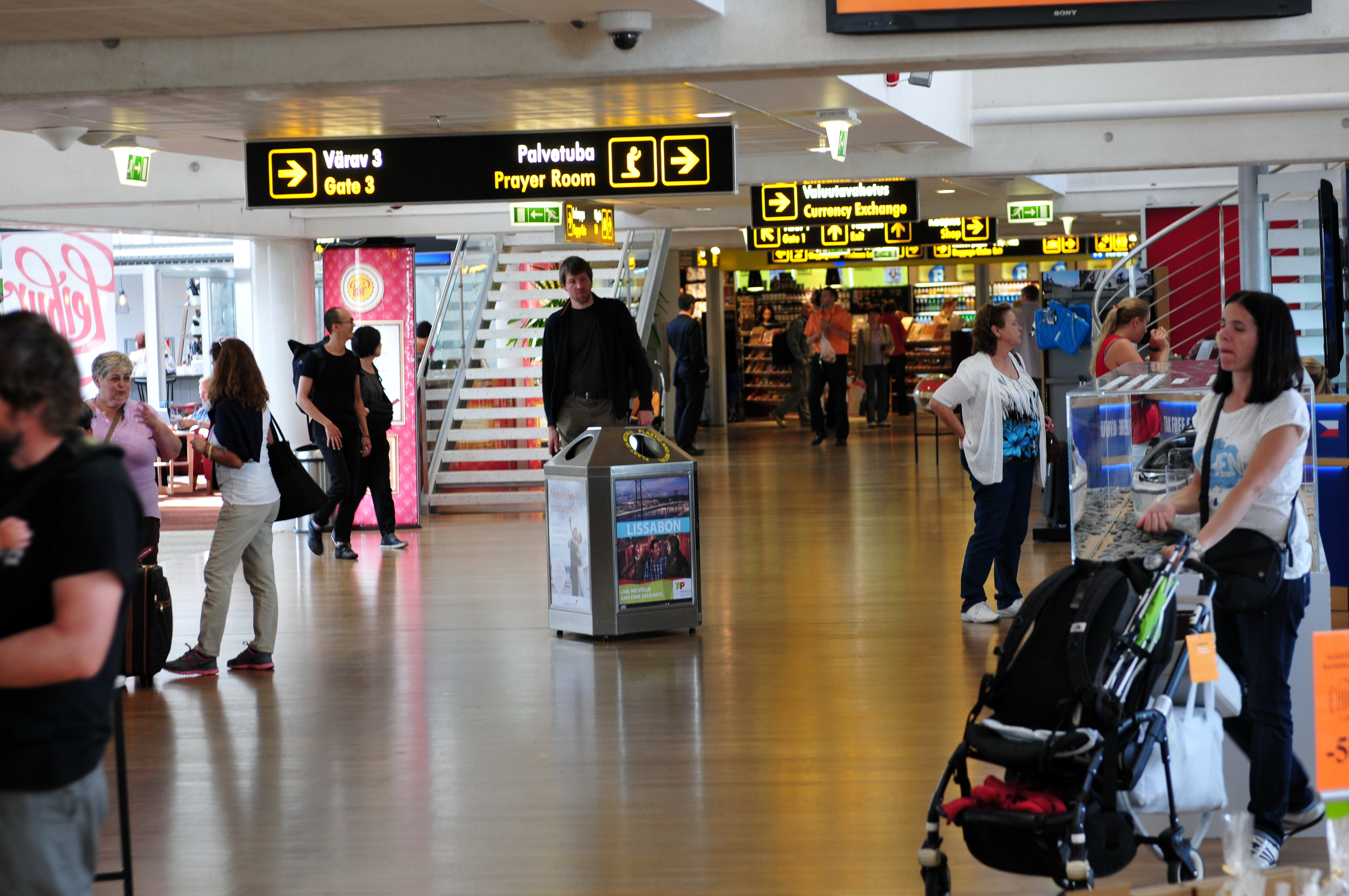
Transit area of the terminal

A lending library was opened on 9 May 2013 in a special area by Gate 1. All books were donated by public including Estonian president Toomas Hendrik Ilves and the First Lady of Estonia Evelin Ilves. The library has books in ten different languages, the majority being in Estonian, Russian and English. There will also be a selection of children's books. On 16 August 2013 Tallinn Airport unveiled a gallery and started exhibiting artists' work in the Passenger Terminal. The gallery of rotating exhibitions on the 1st floor of the Passenger Terminal is open to all arriving and departing passengers as well as those seeing them off or meeting them.

On 1 September 2013, the airport opened an automatic border control system, that was meant to accelerate procedures for passengers travelling out of the Schengen area. The fully automated border crossing system consists of two automated gates and six registering kiosks.

The Nordea Lounge services business class passengers of Air Baltic, Finnair, LOT Polish Airlines, Lufthansa and SAS, as well as Priority Pass and members of the Metropolis loyalty programme.

Additional Tallinn Airport GH check-in terminal is located at the Radisson Blu Hotel Tallinn. Travellers can check in online and print boarding cards directly from the lobby. The system allows to check in 24 hours before departure and choose own specific seat.

=== Airport museum and activity centre ===
The museum is located in a small building near the terminal, also a relatively large area nearby will be transformed into open-air exhibition. Two ancient cult stones, which it is necessary to move during the expansion of the runway, will be transferred to that exhibition. The whole museum plot will be separated from the airfield. The museum will have a direct access from E263 motorway (shares the same route with Estonian main road 2). Additionally, a platform with a view onto the runway will be constructed, giving good possibilities for aircraft spotting. The activity centre opened in 2016.

=== Business aviation hangar complex ===
On 20 March 2013 the airport authorities announced a public procurement for constructing a new hangar complex. The cornerstone of the new complex was laid on 27 September 2013. It has a surface area of 5,230 m^{2} (56,300 sq ft), is located right next to the existing General Aviation Terminal and will be servicing aircraft within a distance of up to 3,000 kilometers from Tallinn. The complex is intended for accommodating a total of nine planes, eight of them are mid-size business jets and one aircraft the size of a large corporate aircraft. It consists of five hangars: the Hangar 1 for the large aircraft (such as Boeing 737, Airbus A318 or Airbus A319), hangars 2 to 5 are intended for smaller business jets (Bombardier Challenger 605, Learjet 60). The whole complex was opened on 15 April 2014 and its operator is Panaviatic, which is going to expand its business jet operations from Tallinn Airport. Apart from providing hangarage for business jets, the new complex also offers MRO services by Panaviatic's subsidiary AS Panaviatic Maintenance. The total investment was close to 5 million euros and the whole complex is the largest in the Baltic states.

=== Aviation services ===
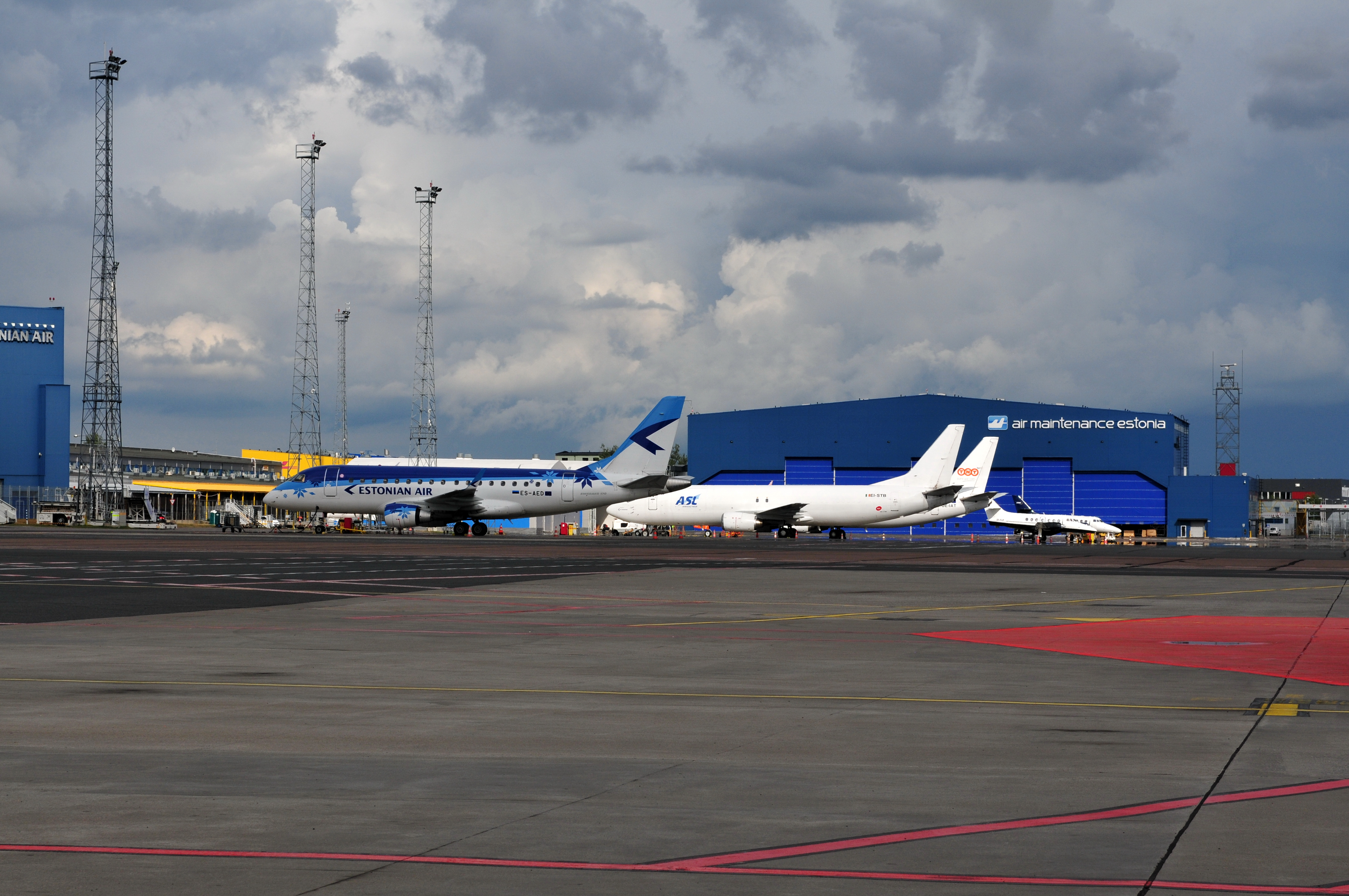
The main maintenance hangar of Magnetic MRO, former Air Maintenance Estonia, at Tallinn Airport (2014)

Magnetic MRO has its facilities and headquarters on the airport property. On 6 September 2012 the company opened a new 5,000 m^{2} (53,820 sq ft) column-free three-bay hangar for Base Maintenance works of narrow-body aircraft, such as Boeing 737 and Airbus A320. The company has in total three main Base Maintenance lines, and two additional lines for lighter checks and modification works. With the addition of the new hangar, the maximum annual line maintenance capacity of the company boosted to 72 aircraft from the present 24. Magnetic MRO said the new hangar will allow it carry out a planned doubling of its workforce. On 21 December 2015 Magnetic MRO announced a launch of the second painting hangar, which will be built in co-operation with Tallinn Airport, in response to growing demand for painting services. The new 2,000 m^{2} (21,530 sq ft) hangar with further expansion possibilities will be capable of housing aircraft in size up to Boeing 737 MAX 9 and Airbus A321neo, as well as regional aircraft, and according to the agreement, the hangar is planned to be finalized and ready for use by 1 June 2017.

=== Air freight ===
Tallinn Airport has 4 cargo terminals with total warehouse space of ca 11,600 m^{2}. The size of warehouse in Cargo 1 is 3601 m^{2} and 2066 m^{2} are dedicated for the office area. Cargo terminal is operated by different operators (including integrators) and Tallinn Airport Ltd. only acts as a lessor. The size of Cargo 2 warehouse is 1255 m^{2} and 758 m^{2} are dedicated for office space. Cargo 2 is operated by TNT Express Worldwide. Other logistics operators include DHL, UPS and FedEx.

== Airlines and destinations ==
=== Passenger ===
The following airlines operate scheduled year-round or seasonal routes at Tallinn Airport:

Airlines	Destinations
Air Montenegro	Seasonal charter: Tivat
airBaltic	Amsterdam, Barcelona, Berlin, Brussels, London–Gatwick, Málaga, Munich, Nice, Paris–Charles de Gaulle, Riga, Vienna, Vilnius; Seasonal: Funchal, Geneva, Gran Canaria, Heraklion, Salzburg; Seasonal charter: Hurghada, Sharm El Sheikh
arkia	Tel Aviv (begins 1 April 2027)
Corendon Airlines	Seasonal charter: Antalya
Eurowings	Seasonal: Düsseldorf, Prague
Finnair	Helsinki
Freebird Airlines	Seasonal charter: Antalya, Bodrum
Heston Airlines	Seasonal charter: Antalya, Burgas, Catania, Corfu, Enfidha, Faro, Funchal, Heraklion, Hurghada, Lamezia Terme, Larnaca, Rhodes, Sharm El Sheikh, Tirana, Tivat
Jet2.com	Seasonal: Birmingham, Edinburgh, Leeds/Bradford (begins 27 November 2026), London–Gatwick (begins 19 November 2026), Manchester
LOT Polish Airlines	Warsaw–Chopin
Lufthansa	Frankfurt
Mavi Gök Airlines	Seasonal charter: Antalya
Norwegian Air Shuttle	Oslo
NyxAir	Kärdla, Kuressaare
Pegasus Airlines	Seasonal: Antalya
Ryanair	Barcelona, Berlin, Dublin, London–Stansted, Milan–Malpensa, Stockholm–Arlanda
Scandinavian Airlines	Copenhagen, Stockholm–Arlanda
Skyline Express	Seasonal charter: Hurghada
SkyUp Airlines	Seasonal charter: Hambantota–Mattala, Sharm El Sheikh
SunExpress	Seasonal: Antalya
Swiss International Air Lines	Zurich
Turkish Airlines	Istanbul
Wizz Air	Budapest, Gdańsk, Kraków, Rome–Fiumicino, Venice, Vilnius; Seasonal: London–Luton, Tirana, Warsaw–Chopin

=== Cargo ===
Airlines	Destinations
ASL Airlines Belgium	Berlin, Katowice
Diamond Sky	Kuressaare, Pärnu, Riga, Ruhnu
UPS Airlines	Paris–Charles de Gaulle

== Statistics ==
Total passengers using the airport has increased on average by 14.2% annually since 1998. On 16 November 2012 Tallinn Airport has reached two million passenger landmark for the first time in its history. Passenger data reflects international and domestic flights combined, share of domestic flights compared to international flights was marginal. Passenger and cargo numbers exclude direct transit.

Annual passenger statistics for Tallinn Airport
Year	Total passengers	Aircraft movements	Total Cargo
1992	205,776	11,000	1,124
1993	239,760	12,170	1,417
1994	336,282	13,378	2,362
1995	366,919	13,784	2,488
1996	431,212	16,695	3,997
1997	502,442	21,455	5,590
1998	563,946	24,951	5,991
1999	550,747	23,590	5,326
2000	559,658	23,358	4,690
2001	573,493	23,633	4,543
2002	605,697	26,226	4,292
2003	715,859	25,294	5,080
2004	997,461	28,149	5,237
2005	1,401,059	33,610	9,937
2006	1,541,832	33,989	10,361
2007	1,728,430	38,844	22,764
2008	1,811,536	41,654	41,867
2009	1,346,236	32,572	21,001
2010	1,384,831	33,587	11,960
2011	1,913,172	40,298	18,371
2012	2,206,692	48,531	23,921
2013	1,958,801	37,856	20,941
2014	2,017,371	37,791	19,860
2015	2,166,663	41,513	16,156
2016	2,221,615	40,938	13,940
2017	2,648,361	45,235	11,345
2018	3,007,644	48,568	11,518
2019	3,267,909	47,867	10,916
2020	863,589	22,962	9,190
2021	1,301,057	26,690	10,560
2022	2,747,679	38,044	11,111
2023	2,961,564	38,155	8,753
2024	3,492,114	42,403	9,910
2025	3,488,104	38,510	10,869

2024 marked the first year that passenger traffic rebounded and exceeded pre - Covid levels, with the total passenger numbers of 2024 (3,492,114) exceeding those of 2019 (3,267,909) by 224,205 passengers, a 6.86 percent increase.

Busiest routes to and from Tallinn Airport (2024)
Rank	Airport	Passengers handled	% change 2023/24
1	Stockholm, Sweden	321,595	▲36.8
2	Riga, Latvia	303,807	▲5.3
3	Helsinki, Finland	302,473	▲11.2
4	Frankfurt, Germany	295,732	▲11.4
5	London, United Kingdom (Note: Includes flights to/from London–Gatwick, London–Luton and London–Stansted)	206,085	▲32.7
6	Warsaw, Poland	205,171	▲3.1
7	Antalya, Turkey	186,955	▲8.3
8	Milan, Italy	140,429	▲39.6
9	Berlin, Germany	99,421	▲44.9
10	Amsterdam, Netherlands	96,612	▲12.5

=== Most frequent routes ===
Top 10 most frequent routes from Tallinn as of December 2024
Rank	City	Flights per week
1	Helsinki	~61
2	Riga	~28
3	Warsaw Chopin	~25
4	Stockholm Arlanda	~19
5	Frankfurt	~18
6	Kuressaare	~12
6	Kärdla	~12
7	Copenhagen	~9
7	Istanbul	~9
7	Amsterdam	~9

== Accolades ==
Year	Award	Category	Results	Ref
2012	EURO ANNIE 'Airport Growth Award' by anna.aero	1–2 million passengers	Won	
2015	Best Airport Award by ACI EUROPE	under 5 million passenger	Silver	
2018	Best European Airport 2018 by ACI INTERNATIONAL	under 5 million passenger	Won	
2018	Airport Service Quality Award Europe 2018 by ACI INTERNATIONAL	under 5 million passenger	Won	
2020	Best European Airport 2020 by ACI INTERNATIONAL	under 5 million passenger	Won	
2020	Airport Service Quality Award Europe 2020 by ACI INTERNATIONAL	under 5 million passenger	Won	
2022	Best Airport Award by ACI EUROPE	under 5 million passenger	Silver	
2023	Airport Service Quality Award Europe 2023 by ACI INTERNATIONAL	2-5 million passenger	Won	
2024	Airport Service Quality Award Europe 2024 by ACI INTERNATIONAL	2-5 million passenger	Won	
2025	Airport Service Quality Award Europe 2025 by ACI INTERNATIONAL	2-5 million passenger	Won	

== Ground transportation ==
=== Tram ===
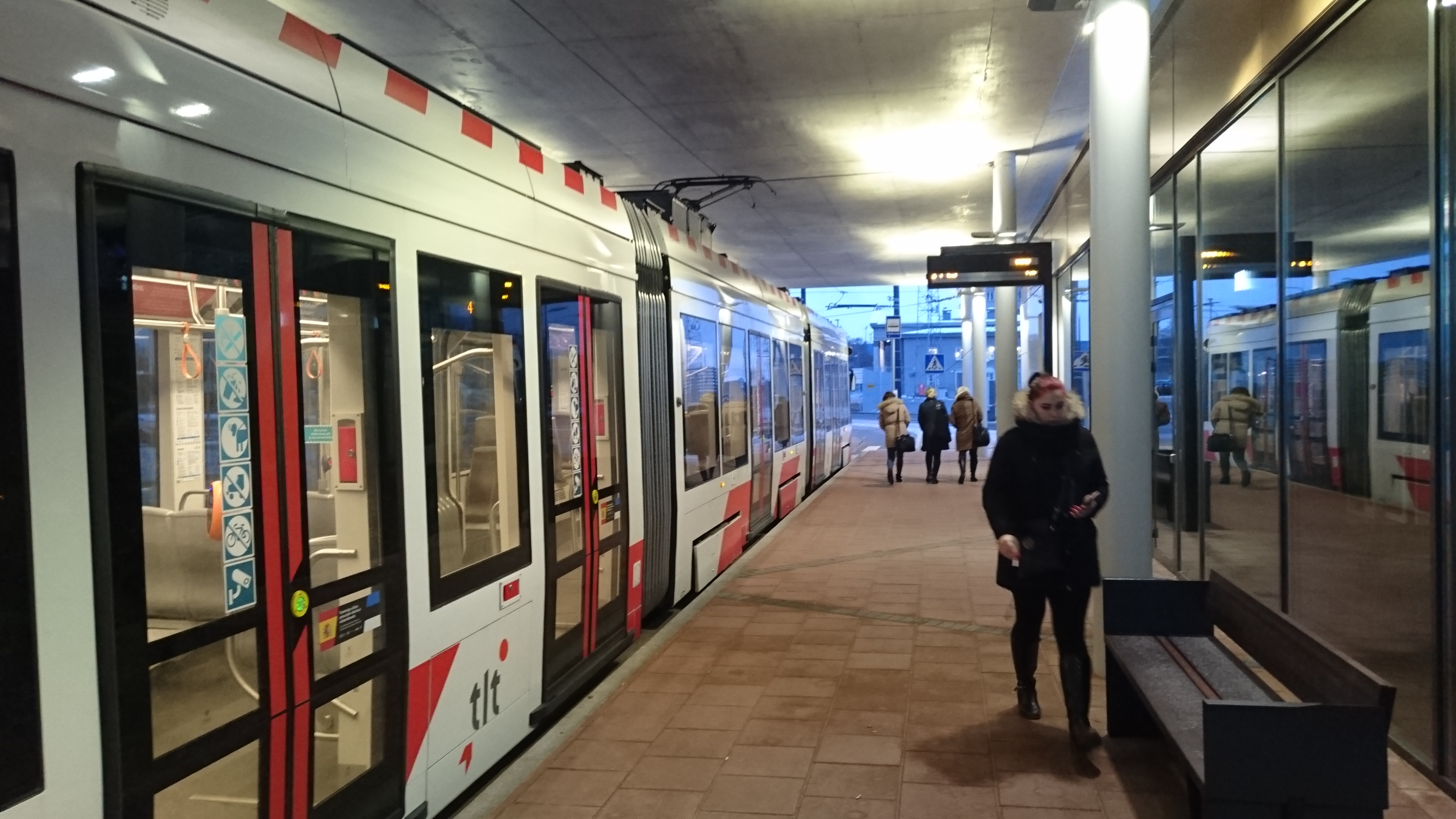
CAF Urbos tram in Tallinn Airport tram terminal

Connection between downtown Tallinn and the airport is provided by tram lines "T2" and "T4". The tram network extension to the airport terminal was opened on 1 September 2017. Trams mostly go with 5-minute intervals, the journey from downtown to the airport (and vice versa) takes 18–19 minutes. Trams run through the 150-metre long Ülemiste tram tunnel beneath the Tallinn-Narva railway. Like all public transportation in Tallinn, the tram is free to the city's residents.

In 2023, the tram service was suspended due to construction of the Vanasadam tram line and later the construction of the Rail Baltica terminal. Service was restored on 1st August 2026.

=== Bus ===
city line "2" and county lines offers a uni-directional connection to Tallinn downtown and Tallinn Baltic Station with its bus stop on Tartu highway, a short walk from the terminal.

Other bus connections depart from the airport's public transport centre shared with trams:

Line "47" provides a connection to Peetri borough in Rae Parish with its terminus being next to a middle school.

Line "49" provides connections to Viimsi Parish, as well as to Iru subdistrict, the village of Iru and Pirita and Lasnamäe districts.

Line "65" provides a connection to Lasnamäe district.

Intercity buses on the Tallinn–Tartu line operated by Lux Express make a stop at the airport on both directions.

=== Rail ===
The nearest station is Ülemiste train station, which lies about 800 metres from the airport, near Ülemiste shopping centre. It provides access to inter-city, regional rail and commuter rail lines of Elron. The station and Tallinn Airport are to be connected through the bus line "49" and the tram lines "T2" and "T4" once the construction around Ülemiste train station allows it.

Ülemiste will be directly connected to the Rail Baltica when it eventually opens.

=== Highway ===
The airport is accessed by the E263 expressway (which shares the same route with the Estonian national road T2). The E20 expressway (which follows the T1) intersects with the E263 expressway 900 metres (3,000 ft) away from the airport towards the city centre. The E67 expressway (Via Baltica, follows the Estonian national road T4) is easily accessible via the 3.8-kilometre-long (2.4 mi) dual carriageway Järvevana Road, which provides a direct connection with E263 at the intersection.

== Incidents and accidents ==
- On 6 September 1938 at 5 p.m. EET, a Warsaw Aero Club RWD-10, piloted by Zbigniew Oleński, crashed into Lake Ülemiste during an aerobatic demonstration. The crash was caused by an error by the pilot, who misestimated the altitude during low-flight manoeuvres, and by muggy weather, which complicated the detection of a water surface. The depth of the crash site was only about 1 metre, which helped to absorb the shock but was too shallow for the pilot to drown. The pilot survived with head injuries. The plane's propeller and landing gear was damaged in the crash, but the plane was recovered and repaired by the staff of the seaplane terminal.
- On 8 January 1954, an Aeroflot Lisunov Li-2 flying from Tallinn to Leningrad-Shosseynaya Airport was hijacked by a man in a Soviet Air Force uniform and a woman. Both had guns and the woman had a knife. The flight engineer attempted to overpower the hijackers, but was killed by gunfire. Other crew members did succeed in overpowering the two. The aircraft turned back to Tallinn.
- In January 1966, an Ilyushin Il-14 flying from Kuressaare to Tallinn, made a landing on ice of Lake Ülemiste short of the runway 08 at its destination in nearly zero-visibility conditions. The incident was caused by an error of the air traffic controller, who misestimated the plane's altitude. The frontal landing gear was damaged during the unexpected landing, but the plane was otherwise intact. It was towed the same day to the airport. No injuries were reported, the passengers walked to the terminal across the frozen lake.
- On 16 November 1990, an Aeroflot Tupolev Tu-134 flying from Tallinn to Moscow was hijacked during a domestic flight by a hijacker who demanded to be taken to Sweden. The aircraft with 64 passengers aboard returned and landed at Tallinn Airport. Upon landing, the hijacker was arrested by Soviet authorities. No casualties were reported.
- On 18 September 1991 at 14:30 EEST (11:30 UTC), a Euro-Flite Dassault Falcon 20 business jet, carrying 2 crew and 10 passengers, landed on the runway of Tallinn Airport with its right main gear failed to lock in its extended position. The captain used ailerons and wheel brakes to hold the aircraft on the runway as far as possible until most speed was lost. Thereafter the aircraft came down smoothly on its right wing-tip while continuing to move turning to the right. At the end of the landing run the aircraft left the runway and stopped about 8 m outside the runway edge. There was no fire. The aircraft involved was OH-FFA and it got substantial damage, but was later repaired. The flight had departed from Helsinki Airport with Tallinn as its destination. No injuries were reported.
- On 20 February 1993 Aeroflot Flight 2134, a Tupolev Tu-134 flying from Tyumen to St. Petersburg, was hijacked during a domestic flight by a hijacker who demanded to be taken to the United States. As there were not enough fuel, he initially demanded to be taken to Helsinki, but agreed to land in Tallinn Airport. After the landing and five and half hours of negotiations 30 passengers were released. The plane then departed and next landed to Stockholm Arlanda Airport, where the hijacker, who was accompanied by his wife and child, peacefully surrendered to Swedish authorities.
- On 24 November 1994 a Komiavia Tupolev Tu-134 flying from Syktyvkar Airport to Pulkovo Airport was hijacked by group of three hijackers, who demanded to be taken to Denmark. They surrendered after landing in Tallinn Airport and several hours of negotiations.
- On 10 February 2003 an Enimex Antonov An-28 crashed while heading to Helsinki Airport during a regular cargo flight. The aircraft banked right during climb and crashed nose down into some trees shortly after takeoff, 300 metres from Tallinn Airport. The aircraft involved was ES-NOY. The captain and first officer were killed during the crash, while a flight engineer was injured.
- On 27 March 2006 an Airest Let L-410UVP-E20C caught fire while standing in Tallinn Airport. The aircraft involved was ES-LLG, it received substantial damage, but was later repaired. No injuries were reported.

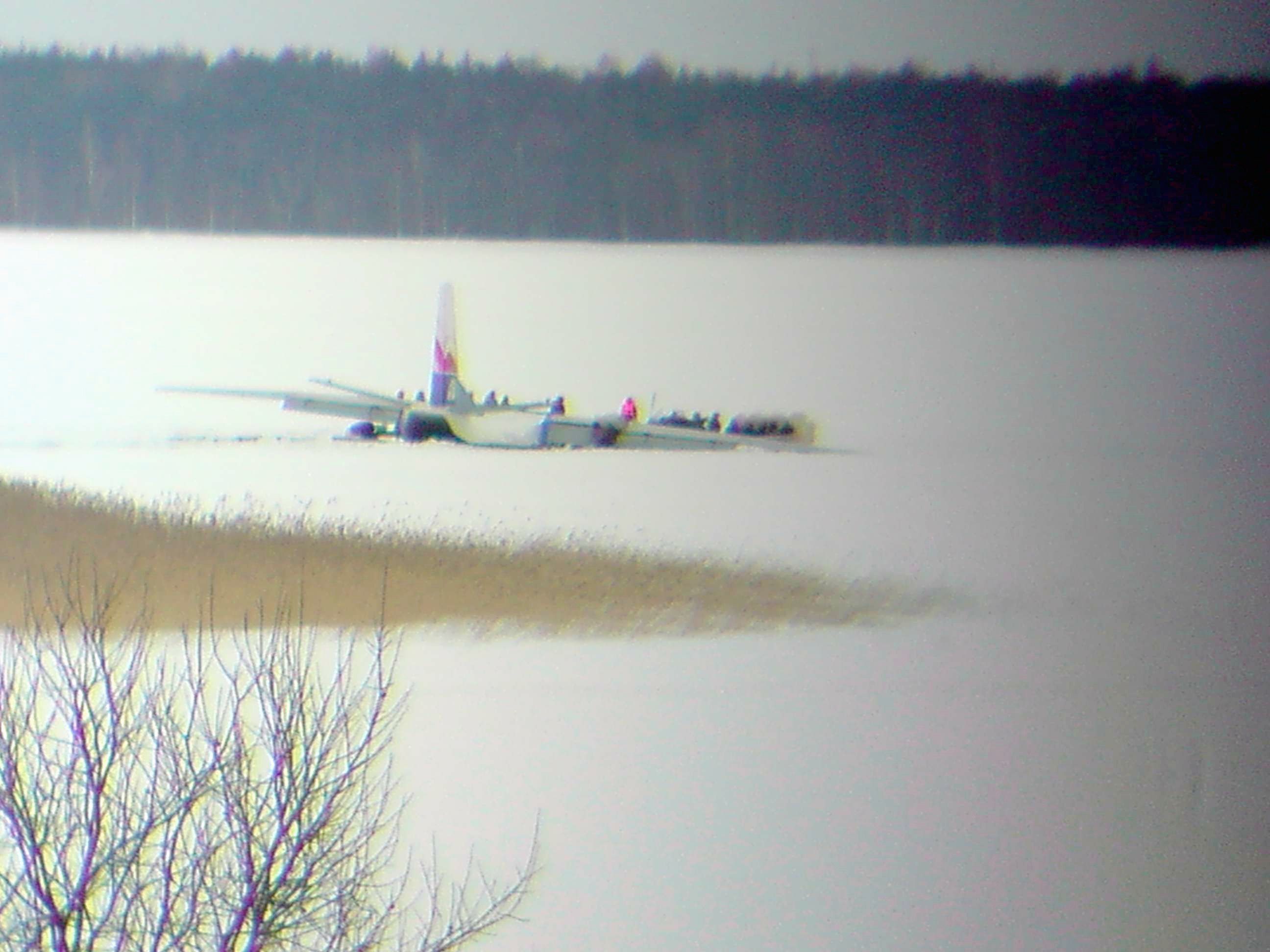
Antonov An-26 on the ice of Lake Ülemiste

- On 18 March 2010 an Exin Antonov An-26 aircraft made an emergency landing on the frozen Lake Ülemiste, close to Lennart Meri Tallinn Airport. Initial reports indicated problems with the landing gear and one of the engines. The flight was operated by Exin on behalf of DHL. The aircraft involved was SP-FDO and the flight had departed from Helsinki Airport. Two of the six crew members were injured. The wrecked plane was later towed to the parking position near the main taxiway and used for rescue trainings until 5 June 2015, when it was partly disassembled and transferred to the search and rescue school in Väike-Maarja. The airport plans to buy another used plane to continue trainings on site.
- On 25 August 2010 an Exin Antonov An-26 aircraft made an emergency landing on the runway of Lennart Meri Tallinn Airport. Initial reports indicated problems with the landing gear during takeoff. The flight was operated by Exin on behalf of DHL. The aircraft involved was SP-FDP and the flight was scheduled to fly to Helsinki Airport. None of the four crew members were injured.
- On 8 February 2013 an ULS Airlines Cargo Airbus A300B4 aircraft skidded off the taxiway during taxiing following a normal landing. All flight operations were cancelled for two and a half hours, except those of planes with shortened takeoff and landing capability, which do not require the whole length of the runway and were cleared for takeoff. Planes en route to Tallinn were redirected to Helsinki and Riga. The aircraft involved was TC-KZV and the flight had departed from Istanbul–Sabiha Gökçen Airport. No injuries were reported.
- On 14 August 2014 an Estonian Air Bombardier CRJ900NG aircraft made an emergency landing on the runway of Lennart Meri Tallinn Airport. The plane, carrying 86 people, was forced to land at Tallinn Airport shortly after takeoff because of left hand main gear tyre was blown on takeoff at 18:10. After airport crews scoured the runway and found tire debris, the pilots were alerted. After burning off most of its fuel, the plane touched down without incident in Tallinn at around 20:30. The aircraft involved was ES-ACC and the flight was scheduled to fly to Amsterdam Airport Schiphol. No injuries were reported.
- On 11 July 2015 at 5:12 a.m. EEST (02:12 UTC) an Aviastar-TU Tupolev Tu-204 aircraft arriving from Novosibirsk Tolmachevo Airport blew two of its right hand main gear tyres after landing. No damage to the runway or injuries were reported. The plane was towed to a parking position for repairs.
- On 28 February 2018 a Smartlynx Airlines Airbus A320-214 made an emergency landing 150 meters from the runway during a touch-and-go landing exercise. After a successful runway approach, the aircraft was unable to regain altitude and collided with the runway. During the collision, the aircraft's engines touched the runway, and the covering flaps of the aircraft's main landing gear fell apart. The aircraft managed to regain altitude after the collision and turn back to make a landing, but after the turn both engines stopped. The pilot made an emergency landing about 150 meters from the runway, stopping at about 15 meters south of the runway. All of the aircraft's tires broke in the course of the training. The instructor and one of the students sustained mild injuries as a result of the accident.
- On 4 June 2019 a Nordica Bombardier CRJ900NG aircraft made an emergency landing on the runway of Lennart Meri Tallinn Airport. The plane, carrying 31 passengers and five crew members, landed at Tallinn Airport at 18:07 with one of its tyres blown. All flight operations at the airport were cancelled until 18:38. According to the spokesperson of Nordica, the plane tyre become damaged during a takeoff in Kyiv. The aircraft involved was ES-ACC and the flight had departed from Boryspil International Airport. No injuries were reported.

== See also ==
- List of the busiest airports in the Baltic states
- List of the busiest airports in the former USSR
- Transport in Estonia
