= Nehatu =

Nehatu may refer to several places in Estonia:

- Nehatu, Harju County, village in Jõelähtme Parish, Harju County
- Nehatu, Pärnu County, village in Lääneranna Parish, Pärnu County
- Nehatu, part of Aa village, Lüganuse Parish, Ida-Viru County
