= Exin =

Polish cargo airline

IATA	ICAO	Call sign
-	EXN	EXIN
- Founded: January 1991
- Hubs: Katowice International Airport
- Fleet size: 4
- Headquarters: Lublin, Poland
- Website: http://www.exin.pl/

Exin is a cargo airline based in Lublin, Poland. Its main base is Katowice International Airport.

== Destinations ==
Exin operates the following services on behalf of DHL Aviation (as of February 2010):

Denmark

- Copenhagen – Copenhagen Airport

Finland

- Helsinki – Helsinki-Vantaa Airport

France

- Bordeaux – Bordeaux – Mérignac Airport
- Marseille – Marseille Provence Airport
- Nice – Nice Côte d'Azur Airport

Germany

- Leipzig/Halle – Leipzig/Halle Airport

Norway

- Stavanger – Stavanger Airport, Sola

Poland

- Gdańsk – Gdańsk Lech Wałęsa Airport
- Katowice – Katowice International Airport

Spain

- Vitoria – Vitoria Airport

== Fleet ==
The Exin fleet includes the following aircraft (as of 1 September 2011):

- 4 Antonov An-26

== Accidents and incidents ==
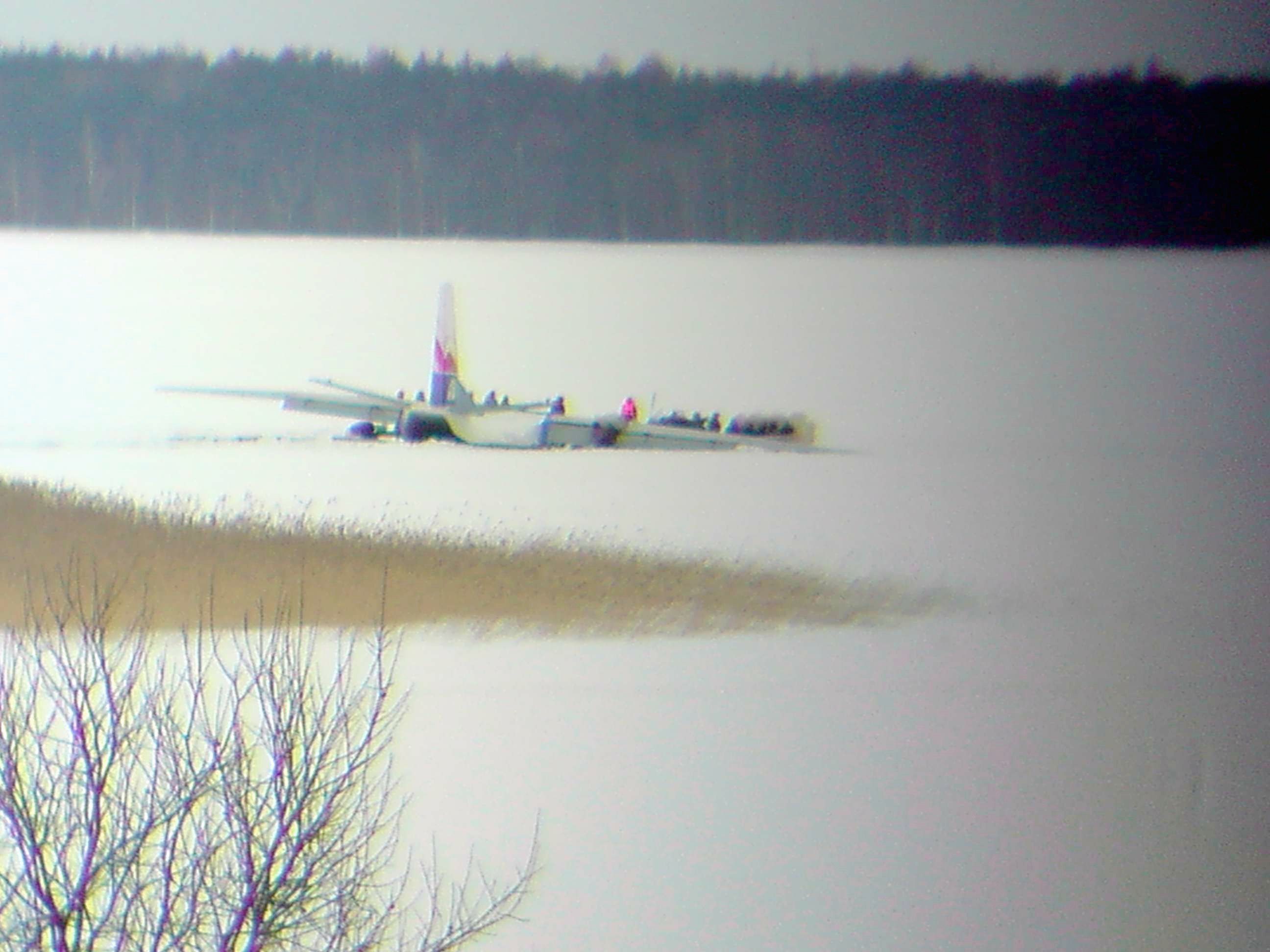
Antonov An-26 on the ice of Lake Ülemiste.

On 18 March 2010, Flight 3589, operated by Antonov An-26 SP-FDO received an unsafe gear warning on approach to Lennart Meri Tallinn Airport, Tallinn, Estonia on a flight from Helsinki Airport, Helsinki, Finland. A go-around was initiated, during which an engine failed, and a wheels-up landing was made on the frozen surface of Lake Ülemiste. Two of the six crew were injured.

On 25 August 2010, Flight 3788, operated by Antonov An-26 SP-FDP rejected takeoff from Tallinn's runway 08 at high speed when the gear collapsed or retracted during the takeoff roll. The airplane skidded to a stop on its belly, no injuries occurred.
