= Nordica (airline) =

National airline of Estonia (2015–2024)

Nordic Aviation Group AS - "Nordica"

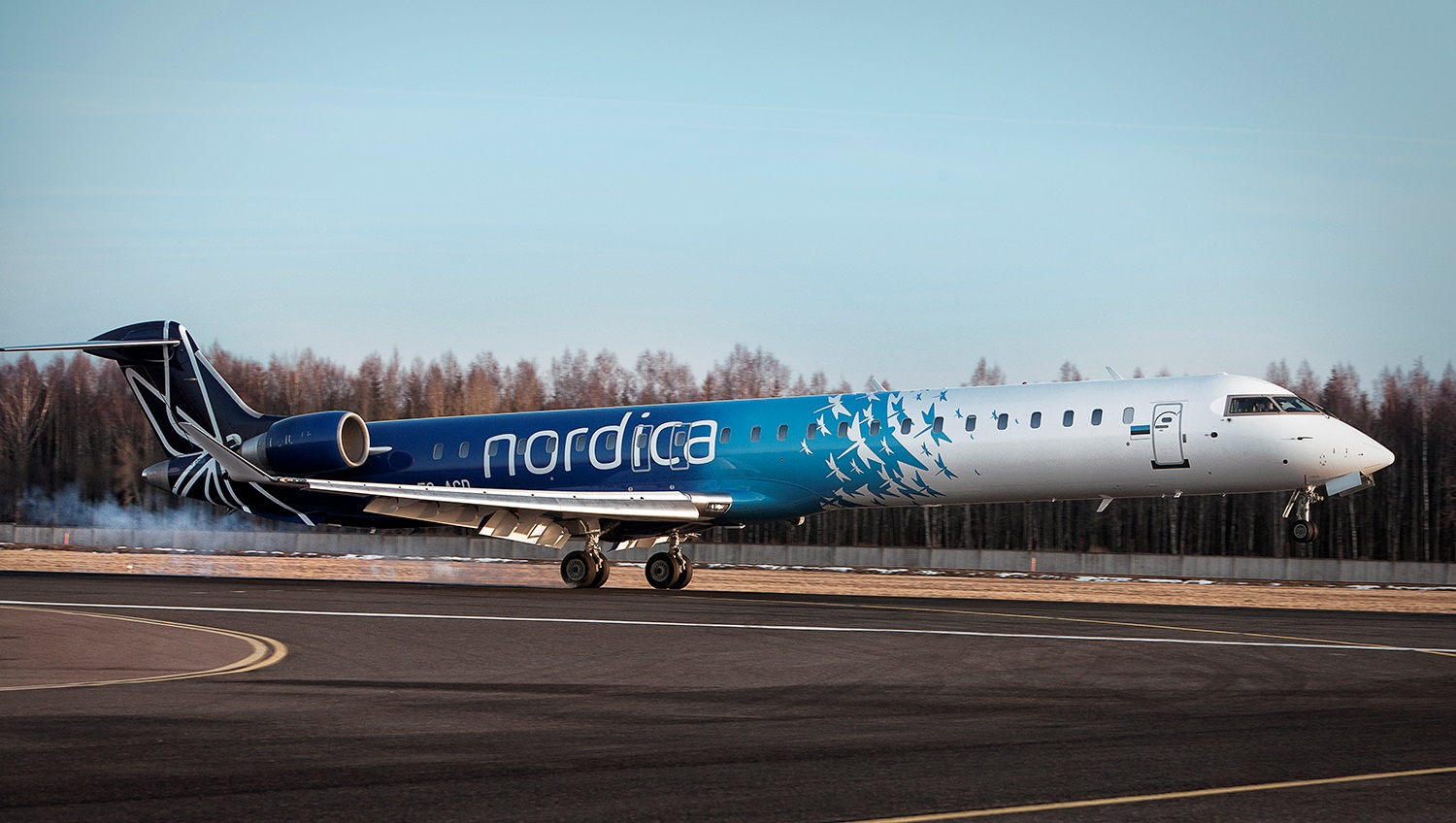
- Bombardier CRJ900ER
IATA	ICAO	Call sign
ND	NDA	NORDICA AIR
- Founded: 25 September 2015
- Commenced operations: 8 November 2015
- Ceased operations: 20 November 2024
- AOC #: EE-023
- Operating bases: Tallinn Airport
- Subsidiaries: Xfly
- Fleet size: 19
- Parent company: Nordic Aviation Group AS; Government of Estonia
- Headquarters: Tallinn, Estonia
- Key people: Remco Althuis (CEO)
- Revenue: ▲€60.16 million (2021)
- Profit: ▲€1.19 million (2021)
- Employees: 314
- Website: www.nordica.ee

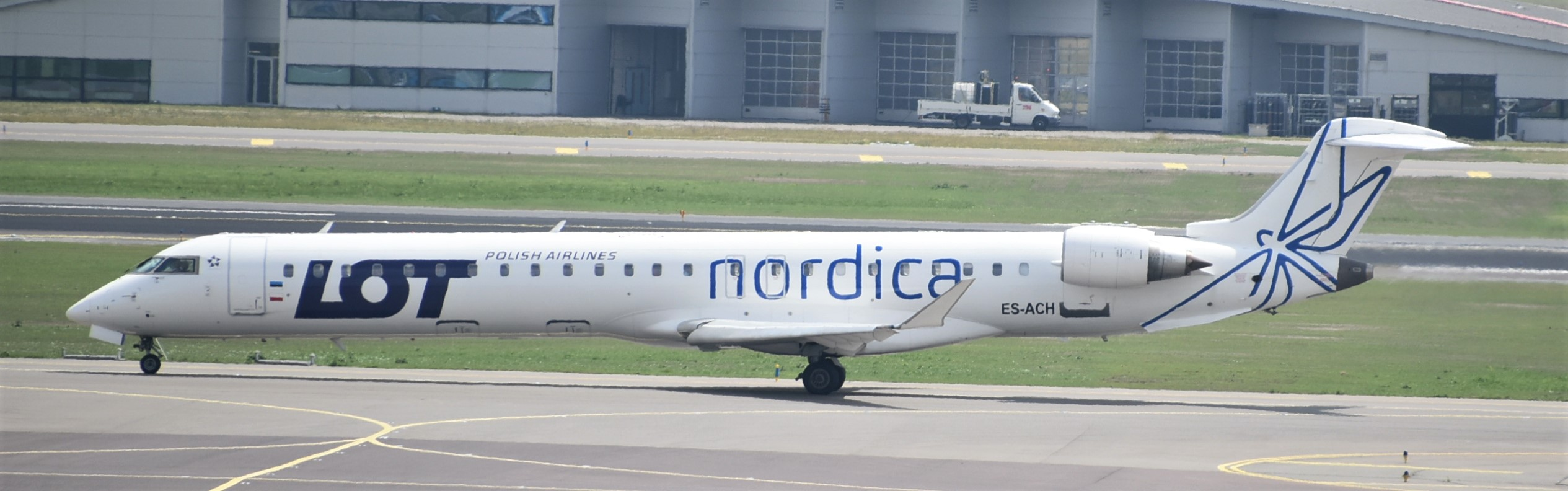
Bombardier CRJ900ER operated for LOT

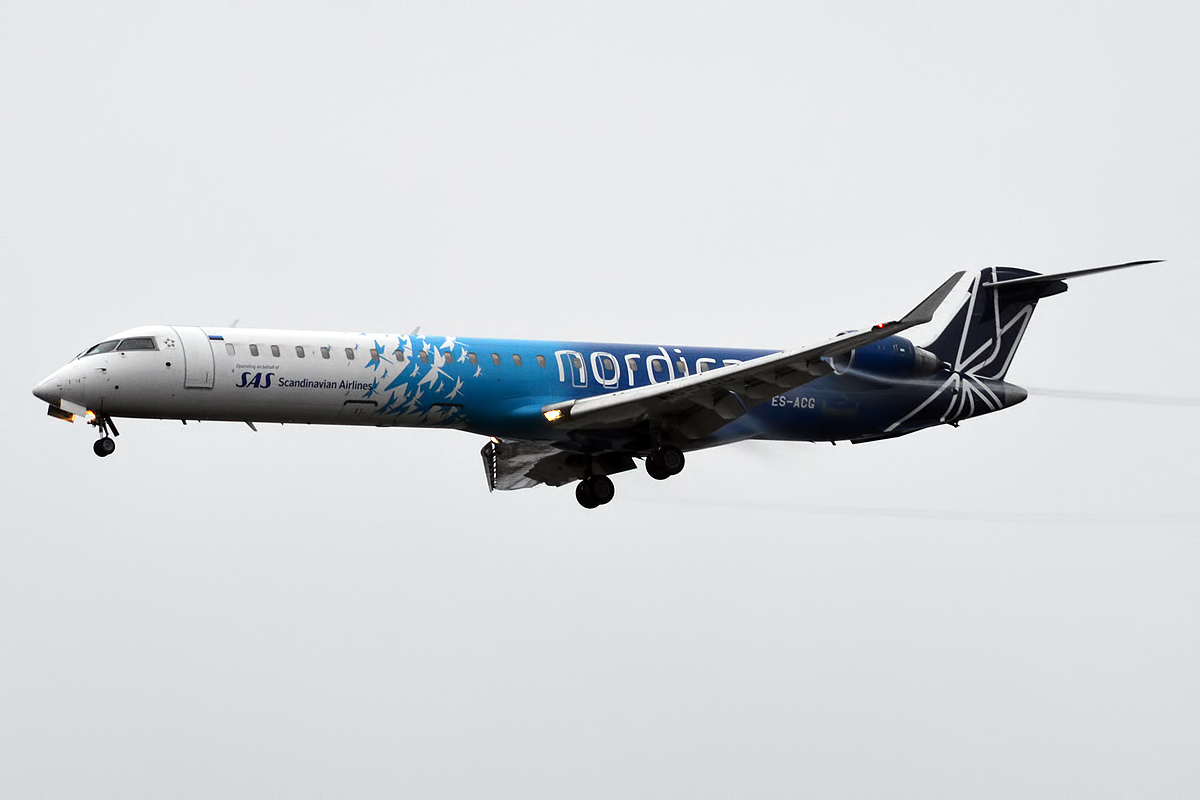
Bombardier CRJ900ER operated for Scandinavian Airlines

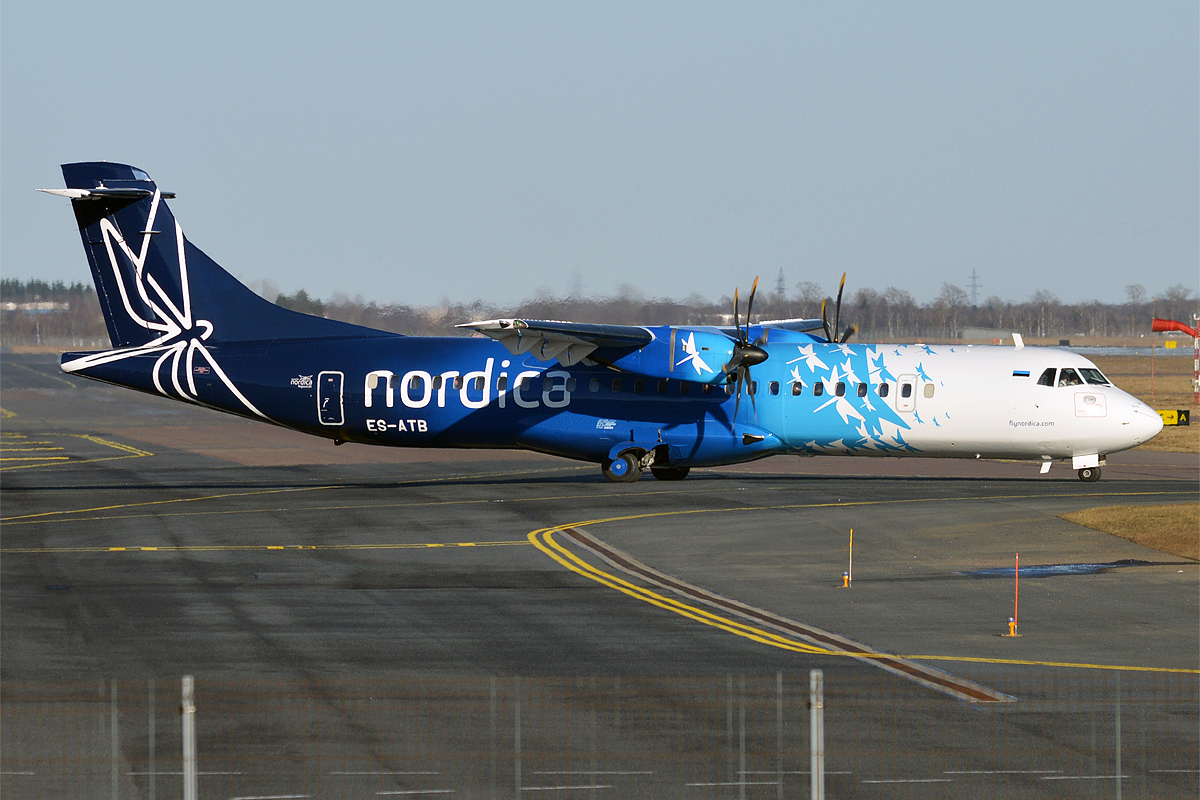
ATR 72-600

Nordic Aviation Group AS, later rebranded Nordica, was an Estonian charter airline which became also the nation flag carrier from 2016 to 2019. At first it was in fact a capacity purchase arrangement provider, headquartered in Tallinn, with offices nearby Tallinn Airport. The company operated scheduled flights to Sweden, but these ceased in October 2019 and subsequently the airline focused on wet-lease contracts on behalf of other European airlines. Nordica also operated PSOs. The company shut down on 20 November 2024 after negotiations to find a buyer fell through.

== History ==
=== Foundation and early years ===
The company was founded on 25 September 2015, subsequent to a decision of the Estonian Government to form a new airline after the liquidation of the previous national carrier, Estonian Air. The symbolic first flight left Tallinn for Amsterdam on 8 November 2015, operated by wet-lease partner BMI Regional. The first own flight on the same route took off on 20 January 2016. The company reused the IATA code (EE) and call-sign (REVAL) of Aero Airlines, which ceased operations in early 2008.

On 30 March 2016, the brand name Nordica was officially announced.

During the first year of activities, Slovenian Adria Airways operated most of Nordica's flights, whilst Nordica was building up its fleet and crew. On 19 November 2016, Nordica entered into a strategic partnership with LOT Polish Airlines, using the latter's commercial platform, ticketing system and flight code. Since most of the flights were marketed by LOT Polish Airlines, which owned 49% shares of the Nordica's subsidiary Regional Jet, still a member of Star Alliance, Nordica also carried LOT's flight codes and callsign on most of its flights. However, the partnership came to and end in early 2021, when Nordica acquired all LOT shares in Xfly (the renamed Regional Jet) and became its sole owner.

As of 2017, Xfly in a partnership with Scandinavian Airlines, operating six ATR72-600s and seven Bombardier CRJ-900s between Scandinavian and other Northern European destinations.

In March 2018, Nordica opened a base at Groningen Airport Eelde, in the north of the Netherlands. In November 2018, Nordica announced it would shut down eight of its routes from Tallinn Airport from the summer schedule of 2019. Additionally, the carrier closed its base in Groningen by 29 December 2018.

In June 2019, Nordica announced it would terminate all remaining scheduled operations from its home base in Tallinn due to the very high competition and loss-making routes on the local market. While a few key routes would shortly be taken over by the company's partner airline LOT Polish Airlines, Nordica would focus its services on wet-lease operations for other airlines with the ambition to expand.

=== COVID-19 and bankruptcy (2020-2025) ===
In February 2020, in the turmoil of the global COVID-19 pandemic, Nordica's subsidiary Regional Jet announced its rebranding to Xfly. The company also expressed interest in expanding the operations by leasing seven Embraer 190/195s.

In July 2021, Xfly announced it was planning to uptake operations other airlines had been ramping up due to pandemic-related low-season in aviation. The management of the company saw opportunities to secure ACMI service contracts throughout Europe from 2021.

In September 2024, Scandinavian Airlines announced it would terminate its contract with Xfly by November 2024. On 20 November 2024, The Nordic Aviation Group, owner of both Nordica and Xfly, announced that the privatization process had failed and that it would immediately cease operations, file for bankruptcy and begin a liquidation process.

On 28 January 2025, Nordica was officially declared bankrupt by the court of Harju county.

== Corporate affairs ==
The Nordic Aviation Group, owner of both Nordica and Xfly, was an employer to over 600 people of 30 different nationalities. Xfly Aviation Academy was also formally part of the group, making sure the company can keep recruiting new pilots in a globally foreseen future shortage of aviation specialists. The maintenance team of the company had grown three times in the years 2020–2022, and in autumn 2022, the so called PART145 was nominated Estonia's top three management teams by the Estonian Aviation Academy.

Headquartered in Tallinn, Nordica and its subsidiary Xfly maintained bases in Stockholm, Copenhagen, Turku, Aarhus, Gällivare, Vilnius, Lisbon, Munich and Hamburg.

== Destinations ==
As of October 2023, Nordica had terminated all of their scheduled operations to focus on wet-lease operations. Nordica operated out of its hub at Tallinn Airport and used to serve the following destinations. The airline began flights to eight destinations in November 2015, with its first flight taking off for Amsterdam. Other initial destinations included Brussels, Copenhagen, Stockholm, Oslo, Kyiv, Trondheim, and Vilnius. All scheduled routes were terminated by October 2019 to focus on wetlease operations.

Country	City	Airport	Notes	Refs
Austria	Vienna	Vienna International Airport	Terminated	
Belgium	Brussels	Brussels Airport	Terminated	
Croatia	Rijeka	Rijeka Airport	Terminated	
Croatia	Split	Split Airport	Terminated	
Denmark	Copenhagen	Copenhagen Airport	Terminated	
Estonia	Tallinn	Tallinn Airport	Hub	
France	Nice	Nice Cote d'Azur Airport	Terminated	
France	Paris	Charles de Gaulle Airport	Terminated	
Germany	Berlin	Berlin Tegel Airport	Airport closed	
Germany	Hamburg	Hamburg Airport	Terminated	
Germany	Munich	Munich Airport	Terminated	
Lithuania	Vilnius	Vilnius Airport	Terminated	
Netherlands	Amsterdam	Amsterdam Airport Schiphol	Terminated	
Netherlands	Groningen	Groningen Airport	Terminated	
North Macedonia	Ohrid	Ohrid "St. Paul the Apostle" Airport	Terminated	
Norway	Oslo	Oslo Gardermoen Airport	Terminated	
Norway	Trondheim	Trondheim Airport	Terminated	
Poland	Warsaw	Warsaw Chopin Airport	Terminated	
Romania	Constanta	Mihail Kogălniceanu International Airport	Terminated	
Russia	Saint Petersburg	Pulkovo International Airport	Terminated	
Spain	Ibiza	Ibiza Airport	Terminated	
Sweden	Arvidsjaur	Arvidsjaur Airport	Terminated	
Sweden	Gällivare	Gällivare Lapland Airport	Terminated	
Sweden	Gothenburg	Göteborg Landvetter Airport	Terminated	
Sweden	Örebro	Örebro Airport	Terminated	
Sweden	Stockholm	Stockholm Arlanda Airport	Terminated	
Ukraine	Kyiv	Boryspil International Airport	Terminated	
Ukraine	Kyiv	Kyiv International Airport (Zhuliany)	Terminated	
Ukraine	Odesa	Odesa International Airport	Terminated	

== Fleet ==
As of November 2024, the last operational Nordica fleet consisted of the following aircraft:

Nordica fleet
Aircraft	In service	Orders	Passengers			Notes
Aircraft	In service	Orders	P	Y	Total	Notes
Airbus A320-200	1	9	—	180	180	
ATR 72-600	9	—	—	70	70	7 operated for Scandinavian Airlines until November 2024
Bombardier CRJ900ER	9	—	—	88	88	Operated for Scandinavian Airlines until November 2024
Total	19	9				

== Subsidiaries ==
At the same time Nordic Aviation Group AS started airline operations it also established Regional Jet OU for less important tasks. It debouted in 2016 and added schedules in the following year. The fleet was made available by the parent company in the form of ATR 72-600 and Bombardier CRJ900ER. In early 2020 the air carrier was renamed Xfly and went on with that same kind of operations which saw also the use of leased Embraer ERJ-190. Schedules were halted in October 2023 and, in parallel with the parent company, on 20 November 2024 XFly stopped all operations.
