= Magnetic MRO =

Company based in Estonia

Magnetic Group
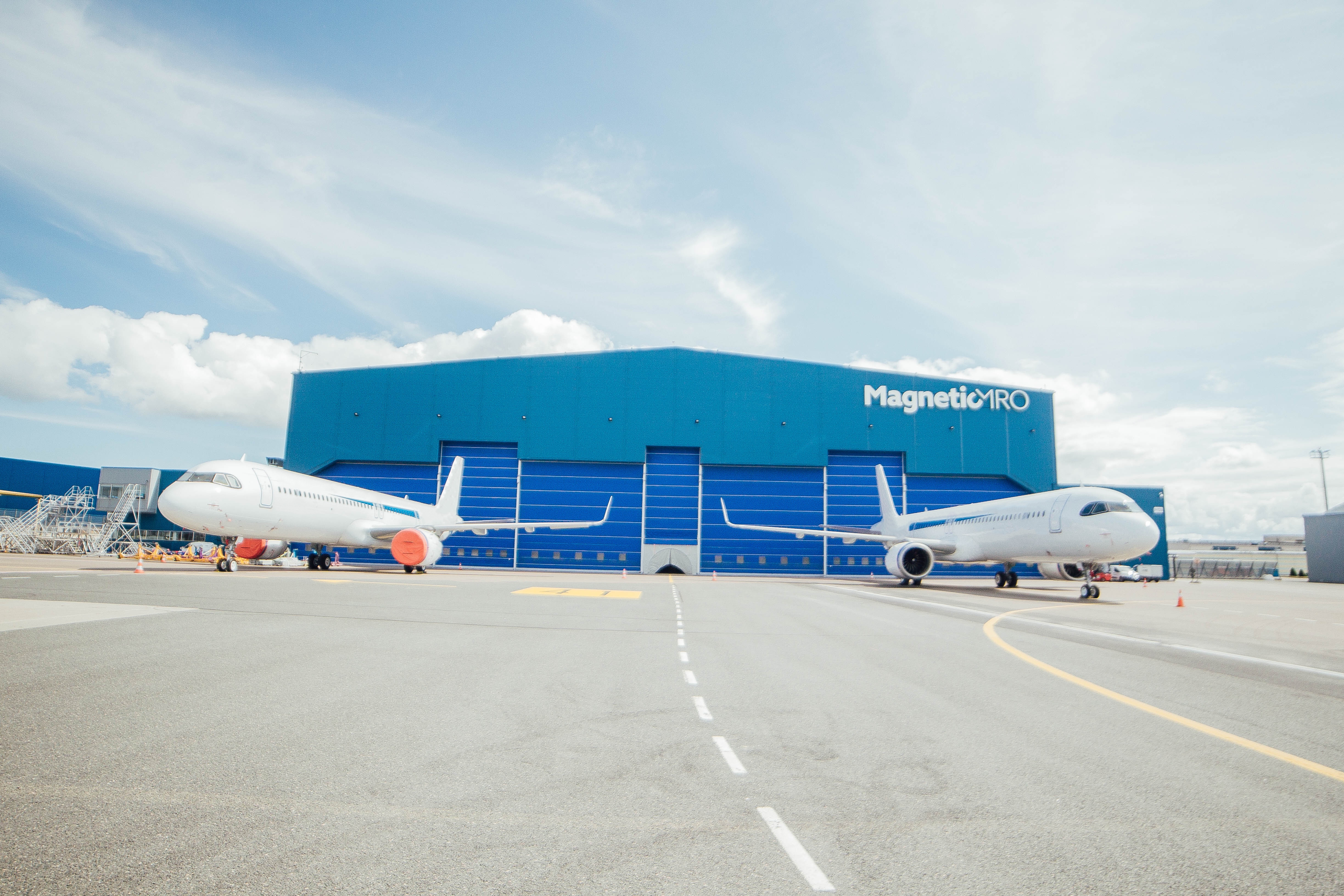
- Formerly: Magnetic MRO AS; Maersk Air Maintenance Estonia AS; Air Maintenance Estonia AS
- Industry: Aviation Services
- Predecessors: Maintenance department of Estonian Air
- Founded: May 15, 2002; 24 years ago in Tallinn, Estonia
- Founder: Maersk Air
- Headquarters: Tallinn, Estonia
- Area served: Worldwide
- Key people: Risto Mäeots (CEO)
- Services: Aircraft maintenance
- Revenue: 141 MLN Eur (2025)
- Net income: 15 MLN Eur (2025)
- Owner: Guangzhou Hangxin Aviation Technology
- Number of employees: 500+ (2026)
- Website: magneticmro.com https://www.magneticgroup.co/

Magnetic Group (former names: Magnetic MRO AS, Maersk Air Maintenance Estonia and Air Maintenance Estonia) is an aviation maintenance company headquartered in Tallinn, Estonia, with a global presence through offices in Vilnius (Lithuania), Miami (USA), and Kuala Lumpur (Malaysia). The company offers a full range of commercial airplane maintenance services. It is certified by the European Aviation Safety Agency and the Federal Aviation Administration of the United States. The company operates worldwide. It is a subsidiary of Guangzhou Hangxin Aviation Technology.

== History ==
The company was established in 1995 as a maintenance department of Estonian Air. In 2002, the maintenance department was separated from Estonian Air, and it became Maersk Air Maintenance Estonia, a company owned by Maersk Air. In 2003, the company was acquired by SAS Group. Accordingly, the company changed its name to Air Maintenance Estonia. In 2010, the company was bought by private equity and venture capital investor BaltCap. In 2014, the company was renamed Magnetic MRO. One year later the company established a sales and engineering office in London, United Kingdom. In 2016, Magnetic MRO acquired a United Kingdom-based aircraft interior company MAC Interiors (now known as Magnetic Creative). Also, in the same year, EngineStands24 was founded by Magnetic MRO. In 2017, the Estonian business promotion agency Enterprise Estonia selected Magnetic MRO as the Company of the Year and Exporter of the Year. In 2017, Magnetic MRO with Crestline Investors formed a joint venture Magnetic Parts Trading Limited, to purchase aircraft and engines, parting them out and selling as individual components.

In March 2019, Magnetic MRO acquired Direct Maintenance, an Amsterdam-based independent line maintenance service provider for narrow- and wide-body aircraft, with line maintenance hubs around the world. In early 2020, the launch of Magnetic Leasing, a company with a focus on long and short-term aviation asset management and leasing, was announced.

At the beginning of 2022, Magnetic Group announced the expansion and the opening of its new representative office in Miami, the USA.
