= Estonian Air =

National airline of Estonia (1991–2015)

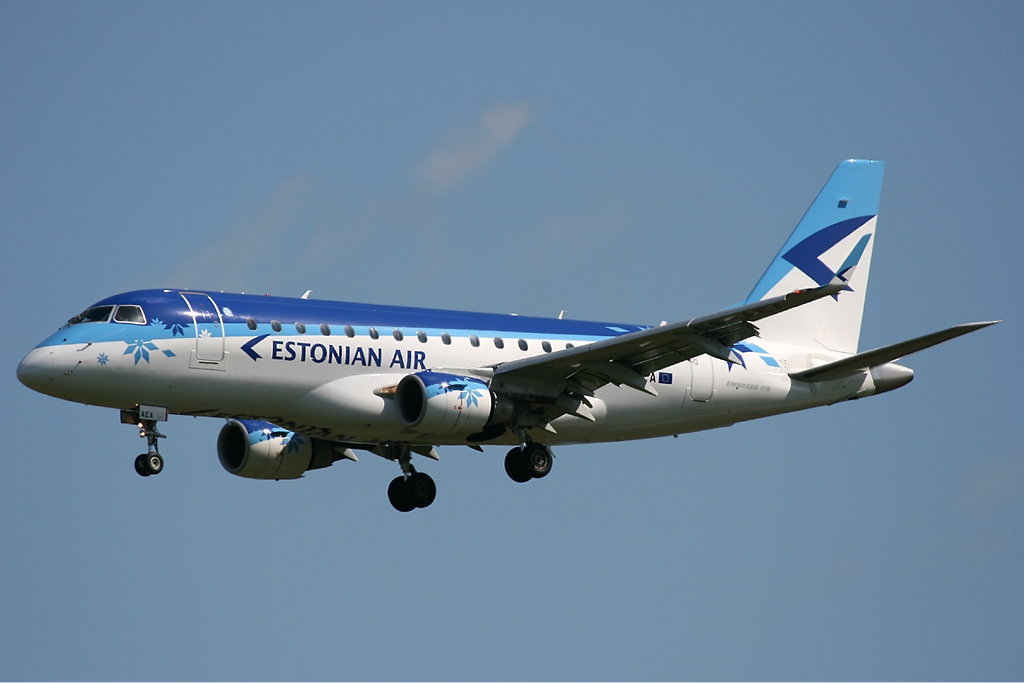
- Embraer 170
IATA	ICAO	Call sign
OV	ELL	ESTONIAN
- Founded: 1 December 1991
- Ceased operations: 8 November 2015
- Hubs: Tallinn Airport
- Frequent-flyer program: EuroBonus
- Subsidiaries: AS Estonian Air Regional; Estonian Aviation Fuelling Services; Estonian Air Jet Leasing; AS Amadeus Eesti
- Headquarters: Tallinn, Estonia
- Key people: Jan Palmér (CEO)
- Revenue: ▼€69.9 million (2014)
- Profit: ▼€−10.4 million (2014)

Notes
- Owner: Republic of Estonia (97.34%); Succeeded by Nordica

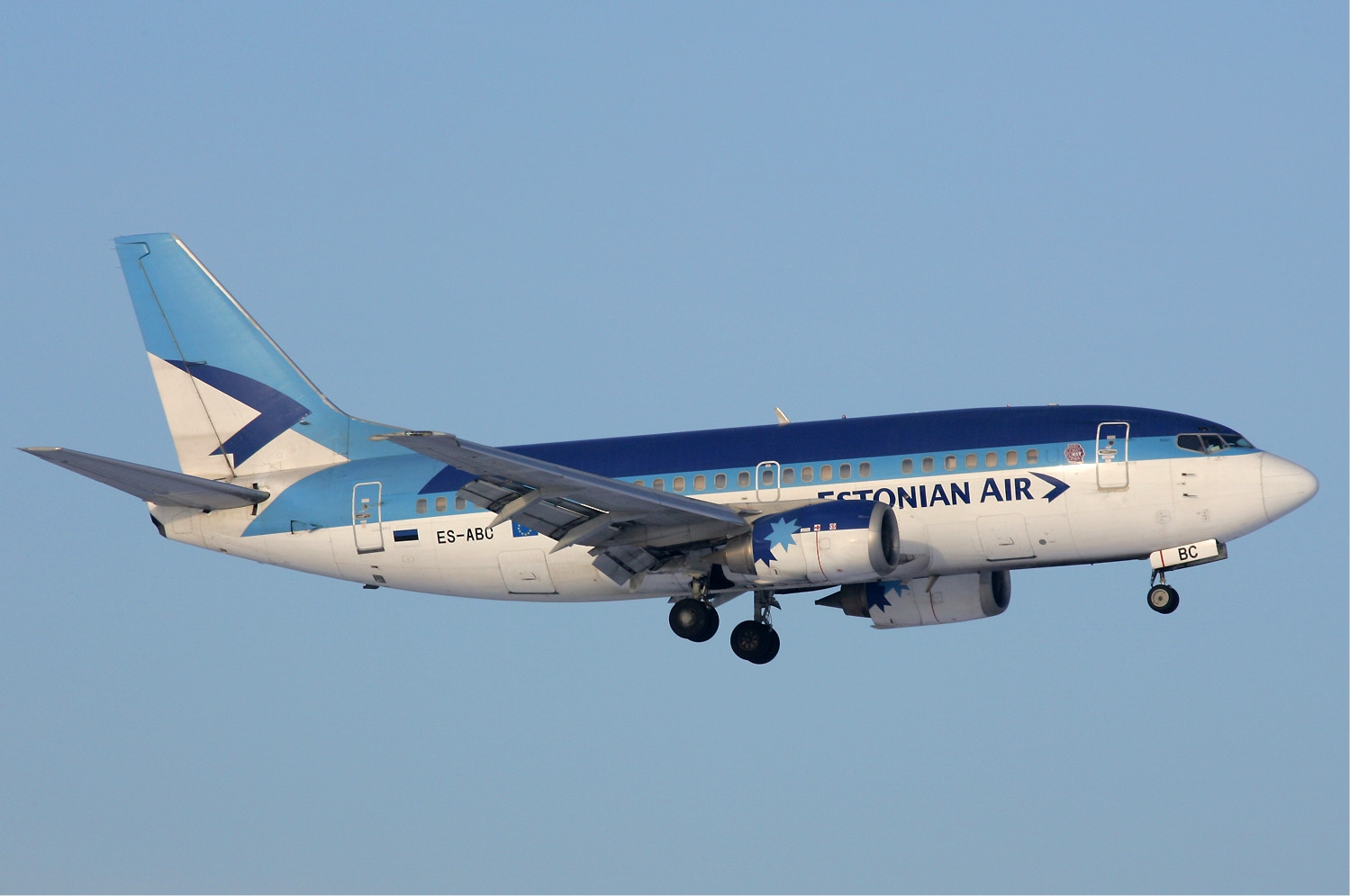
Boeing 737-500

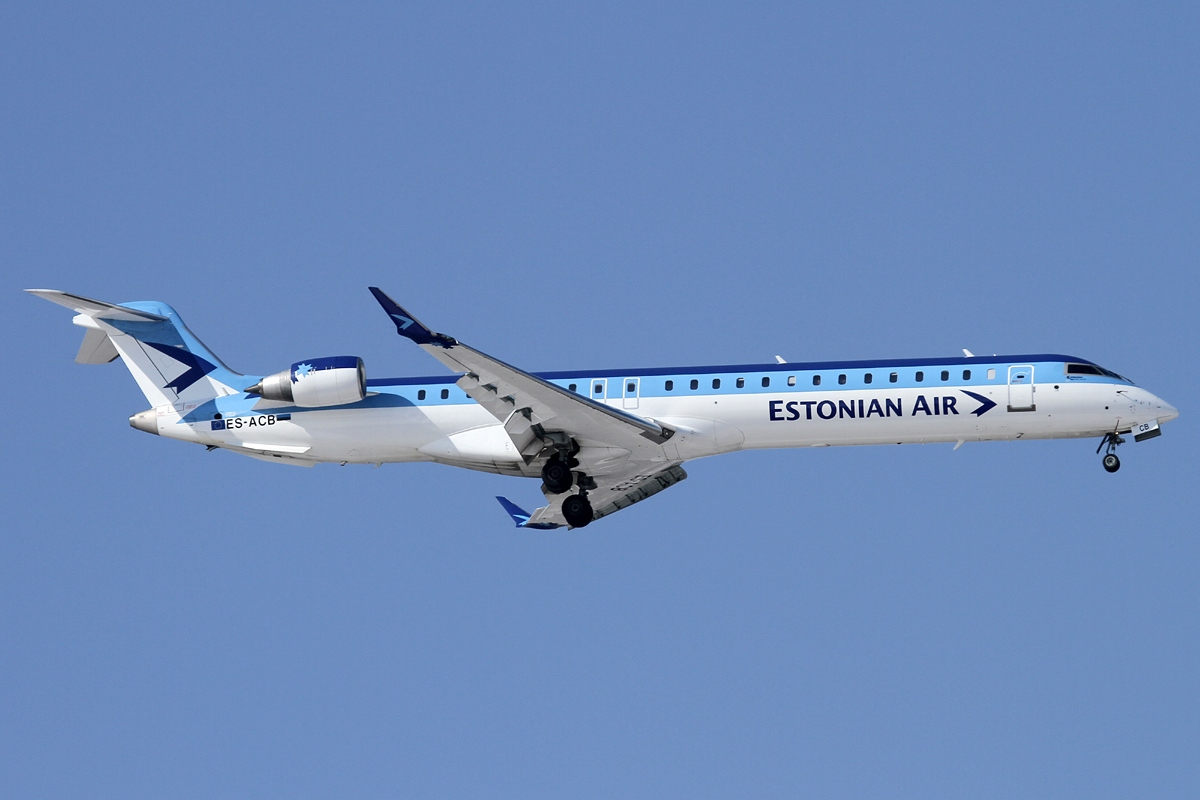
Bombardier CRJ900NG

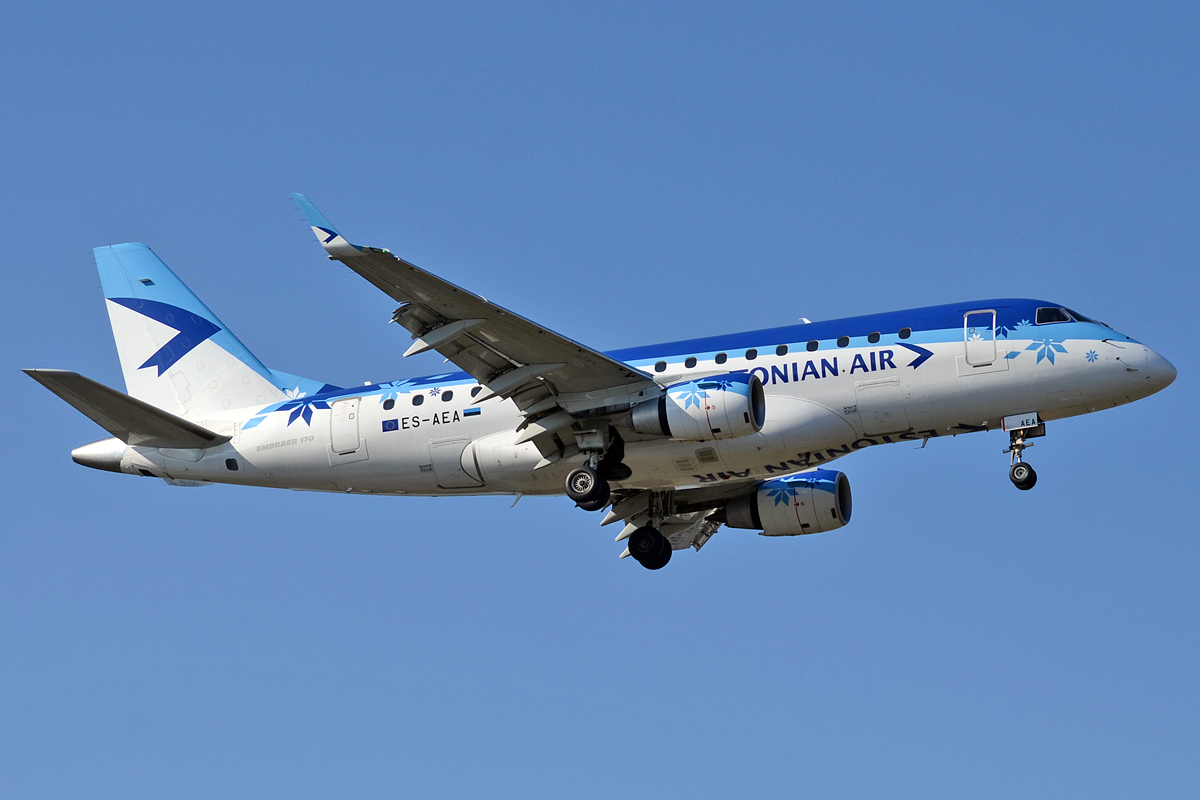
Embraer E170

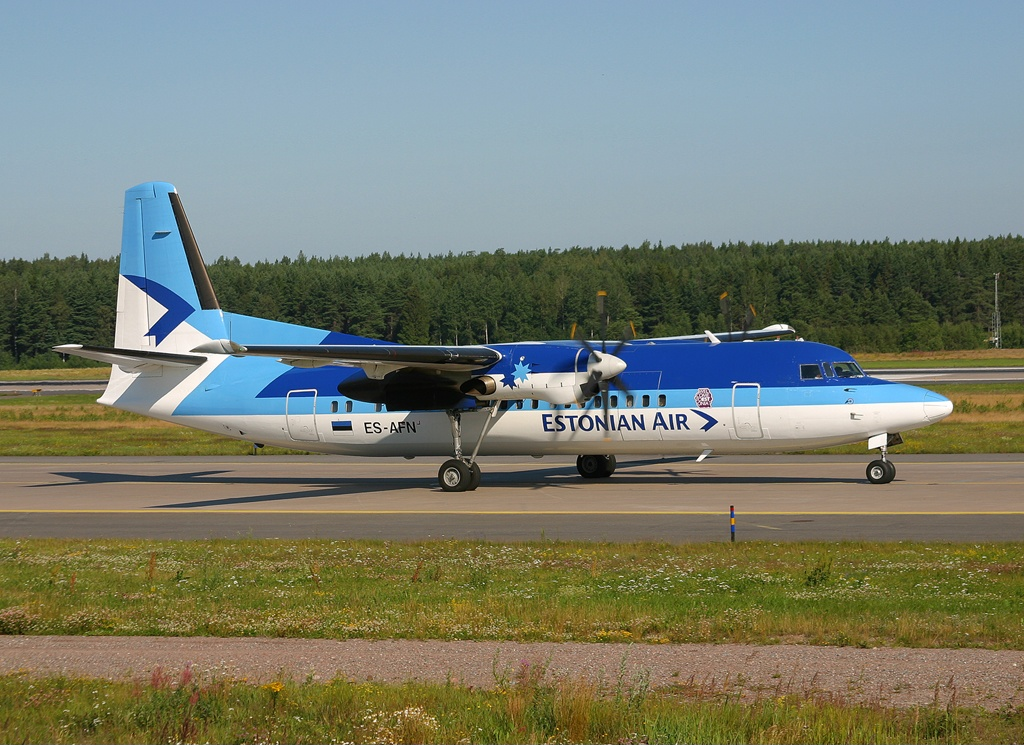
A Fokker 50 in 2002

Estonian Air was the flag carrier airline of Estonia between 1991 and 2015. Headquartered in Tallinn it operated scheduled services from Tallinn Airport. Prior to its closure, the airline flew from Tallinn to 11 destinations in Europe.

From 1991 to 1996, and again from 2010, Estonian Air was owned by the Estonian government. In 2010, the Estonian government purchased the company back from SAS Group to ensure it did not go bankrupt. On 7 November 2015, the European Commission ruled that the government funding given to the airline had been in breach of the European Union regulations and had to be returned. Not having such funds, Estonian Air ceased all operations in the following day and immediately entered the process of liquidation.

== History ==
=== Early years ===
The airline was established by the Estonian government in October 1991 with aircraft inherited from the defunct local Aeroflot Directorate.

In 1992, the airline became a member of IATA and the first Boeing 737-500 was delivered in 1995. The company was partially privatised in 1996, with 66% of shares to Maersk Air (49%) and Cresco investment bank (17%). The company leased two Boeing 737-500s to replace its old Soviet planes, and in 1996, after obtaining two more Fokker 50s, it was able to retire the Soviet fleet entirely.

In 2003, Maersk Air sold its shares to SAS and the Fokker 50s were retired. By 2004, the airline had carried its 500,000th passenger.

In March 2007, Estonian Air announced that they will lease another Boeing 737-500 and serve a new destination, Vienna. Estonian Air leased two Saab 340s and in June 2008 the air carrier established a subsidiary company, Estonian Air Regional. This added new destinations from Tallinn to Kuressaare, Stockholm, Helsinki and Vilnius. Later on to Saint Petersburg and to Minsk.

In 2008, three new destinations (Minsk, Munich and Rome) were served and the company announced that it was ordering three Bombardier CRJ900 NG and further 3 options. On 27 November 2008, Estonian Prime Minister Andrus Ansip announced that SAS had approached the Estonian government, urgently requesting a cash injection to save the airline and offering to buy out the government's stake in the airline. The Estonian government is reportedly in negotiations with ferry company Tallink to come up with a counter-proposal.

In 2009, Estonian Air gave up its Vienna, Frankfurt and Simferopol routes. The company closed its ground handling division. New destinations from Tallinn were Amsterdam, Berlin and St. Peterburg, new route was Tartu–Stockholm.

=== Development since 2010 ===
In 2010, Estonian Air started cooperation with KLM, announcing the new Tallinn–Vilnius–Amsterdam route (starting from 12 February 2010).

Estonian Air started operating flights to Trondheim 5 September 2011, with 5 weekly flights. In November 2011, Estonian Air announced reopening flights to Riga, 17 weekly flights starting from 25 March 2012, and to Helsinki, 18 flights weekly starting from 26 March 2012. As well as opening flights to Vienna, 6 weekly starting from 25 March 2012, and to Hannover, 6 weekly flights starting from 2 April 2012. It also announced increased flights to Stockholm, St. Petersburg and Vilnius starting from March 2012 and add extra flights on the Tallinn-Moscow route during the December 2011 holidays.

As of 10 May 2010, the government of Estonia and SAS Scandinavian Airlines have agreed to a transaction where the Estonian government provides an additional 21 million EUR in capital to Estonian Air resulting in the stake of SAS in the carrier to decrease from 49% to 10%. At the same time, the two parties have agreed that the Estonian government gets an option to buy the remaining 10% stake from SAS at a later time between then and 2014. Estonian Air and SAS Scandinavian Airlines will continue to cooperate in the same fashion for the time being. The short-term aim of the government is to become a leading shareholder and to invest in the company to ensure its future, as Estonian Air is strategically important to the state. In September 2010, Estonian Air announced that they have finally signed an agreement with Bombardier, in which two CRJ-900 NextGen aircraft are going to be delivered in the beginning of 2011 (both planes were delivered in January 2011), and a third one in 2012. The agreement with SAS Scandinavian Airlines was signed on 10 September 2010 and it took effect on 27 October 2010 when the Estonian Parliament ratified the 2010 state budget modifications, allocating needed funds for investment. In November 2011, Minister of Economic Affairs Juhan Parts proposed that SAS should follow the state's lead in making substantial investments in Estonian Air. SAS Vice-president Sture Stolen however said that this is unlikely: "We have a good and important partnership with them, but it is not our strategy to be part owners in Baltic airlines".

Estonian Air's new CEO and former AirBaltic chief commercial officer Tero Taskila expected the company to be profitable by 2012 after losing money since 2005. According to Taskila, the company already took a big step late in 2011 by clearing up its messy leadership issues. After further poor financial results in 2012, the government of Estonia decided to fire CEO Tero Taskila. From 1 November 2012, the new CEO was Jan Palmér, who has had over 20 years of experience with different airlines in Scandinavia. Estonian Air Regional was closed down in 2013.

=== Cessation of operations ===
On 8 November 2015, Estonian Air ceased all operations after the European Commission declared the government funding received by the airline illegal which would have forced them to pay back over €85 million. Replacement services on key Estonian Air routes have been established on short notice by the government-supported joint venture Nordic Aviation Group (NAG) under leadership of Adria Airways in joint operations with several European regional carriers.

== Services ==
On all flights there were two classes of service:

=== Flex Class ===
Passengers holding Business or Flexible Economy fare tickets were seated in the forward sections of the one-cabin aircraft. All high-fare passengers were served snacks or meals and beverages depending on the time of departure and length of the flight. Alcoholic drinks were included in the ticket price as well (wine, sparkling wine, gin, rum, brandy etc.).

=== Eco Class ===
Eco Class was the Economy-fare product. Refreshments had to be purchased from a buy on board drink menu. As of March 2015, Eco Class passengers were offered complimentary coffee, tea and water on all flights.

=== Lounge ===
Estonian Air Business Class passengers and SAS EuroBonus Gold/Pandion card holders were welcomed to the Business Class Lounge in the transit area in Tallinn. Payphone, free newspapers and magazines were available. Other facilities included a bar, Internet-connected computers and printers.

== Fleet ==
As of the airline's shutdown on 8 November 2015, Estonian Air had a fleet of 6 aircraft with an average age of 8.2 years – 3 Bombardier CRJ900s, 2 CRJ700s and a single Embraer E-170. The company was phasing out its 4 Embraers with plans to operate with 8-10 Bombardier CRJs.

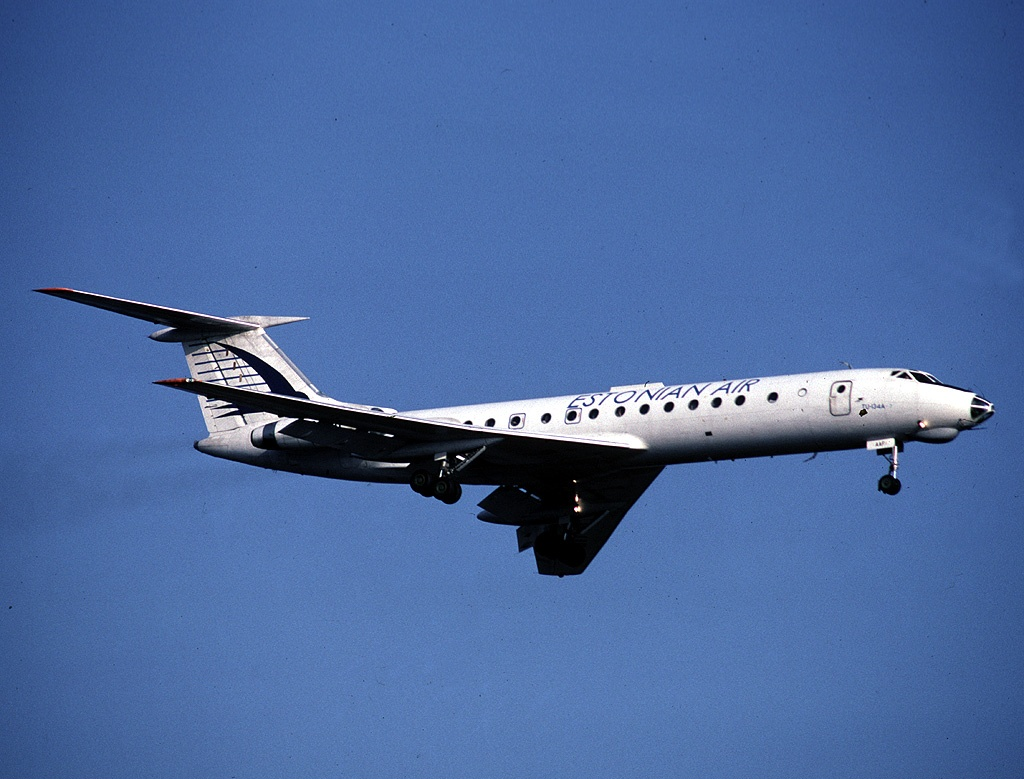
A Tupolev Tu-134 in 1994

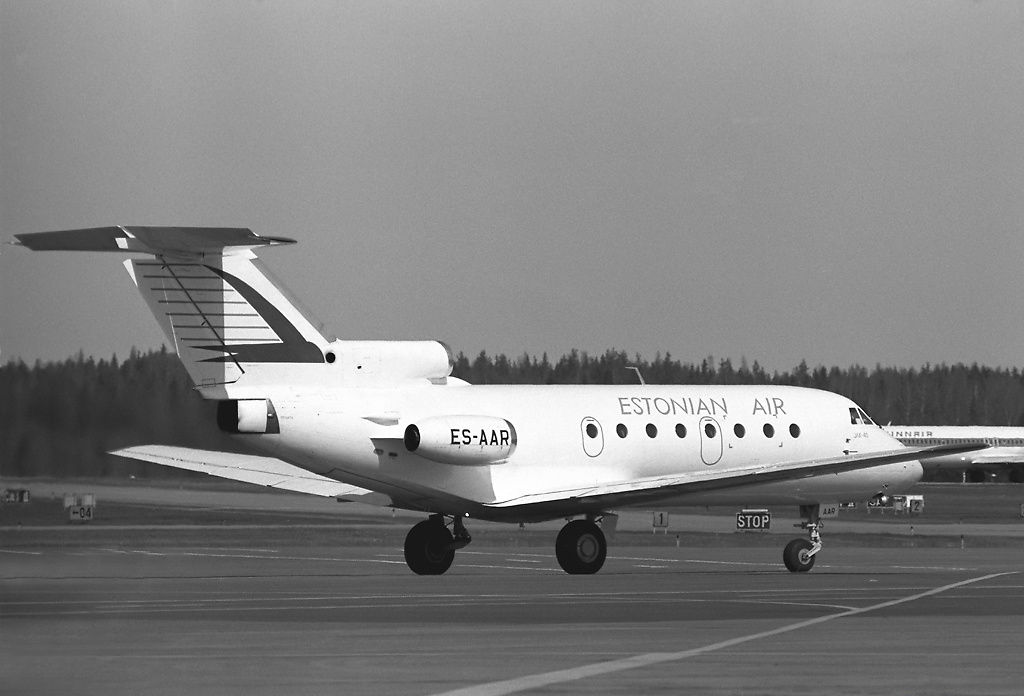
A Yakovlev Yak-40 in 1994

Estonian Air Mainline historical fleet since 1991
Aircraft	Introduced	Retired	Notes
Antonov An-2	1991	1996	From Aeroflot's local division.
Yakovlev Yak-40	1991	1998	From Aeroflot's local division.
Tupolev Tu-134A	1991	1996	From Aeroflot's local division.
Fokker 50	1996	2003	
Boeing 737-500	1995	2012	
Boeing 737-300	2006	2012	
Saab 340	2007	2013	
Bombardier CRJ900NG	2011	2015	
Embraer E170	2012	2015	
ATR 42-500	2014	2015	
Saab 340	2015	2015	

== Subsidiaries ==
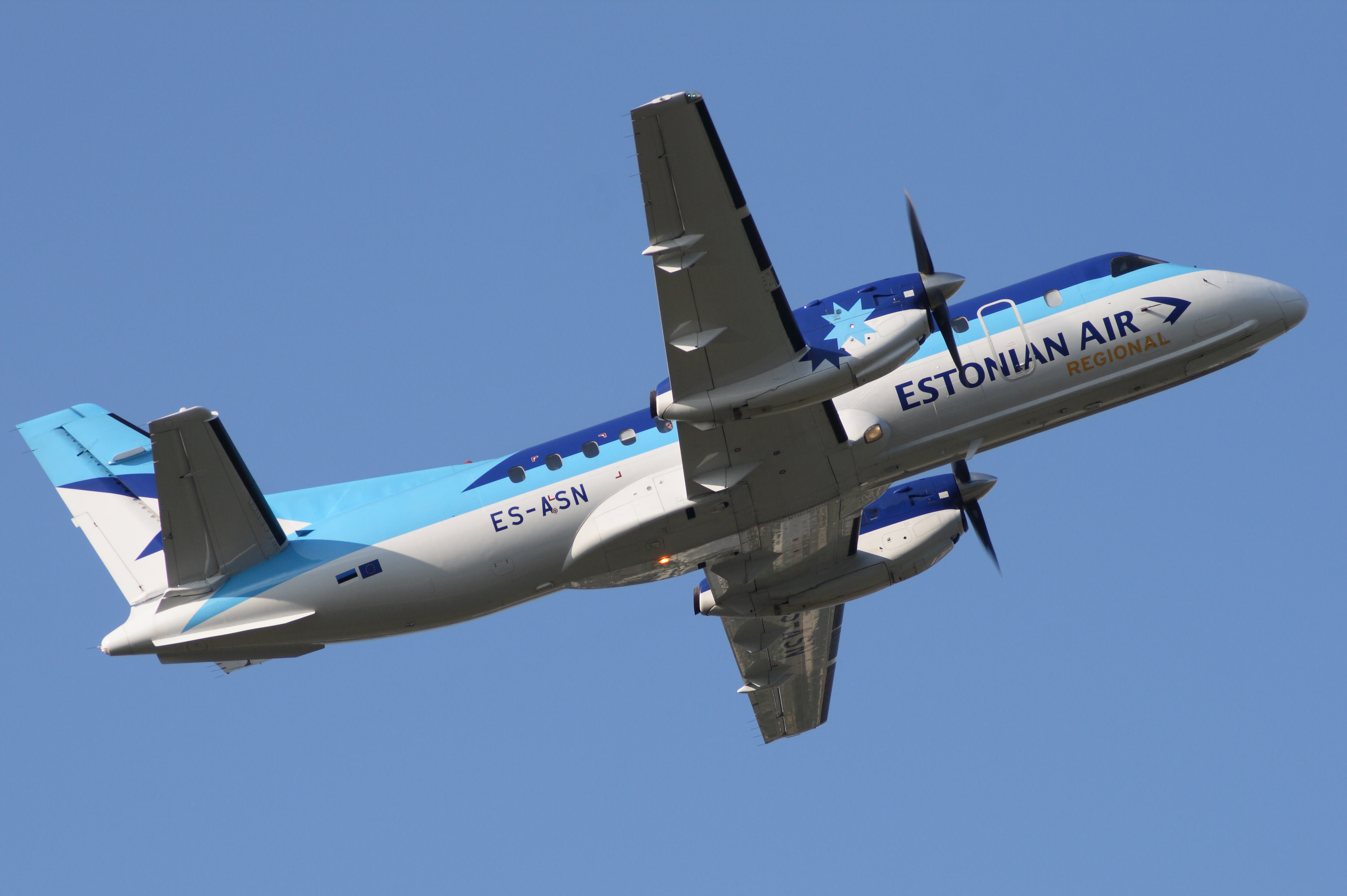
Saab 340

Wholly-owned Estonian Air Regional was established in June 2007 and activated in the following month of September. It took over parent airline routes from Tallinn to Kuressaare, Stockholm, Helsinki and Vilnius. Later on Saint Petersburg and Minsk were added. In the beginning the fleet was made up by a single Saab 340 but another one was added later on. The tiny airlines stopped operating in 2013 and all assets were reintegrated back in the parent airline.
