= Lux Express =

Estonian transport company

- Founded: 1994; 32 years ago
- Headquarters: Tallinn, Estonia
- Service area: Baltic states Poland; Russia
- Service type: Intercity bus service
- Website: www.luxexpress.eu

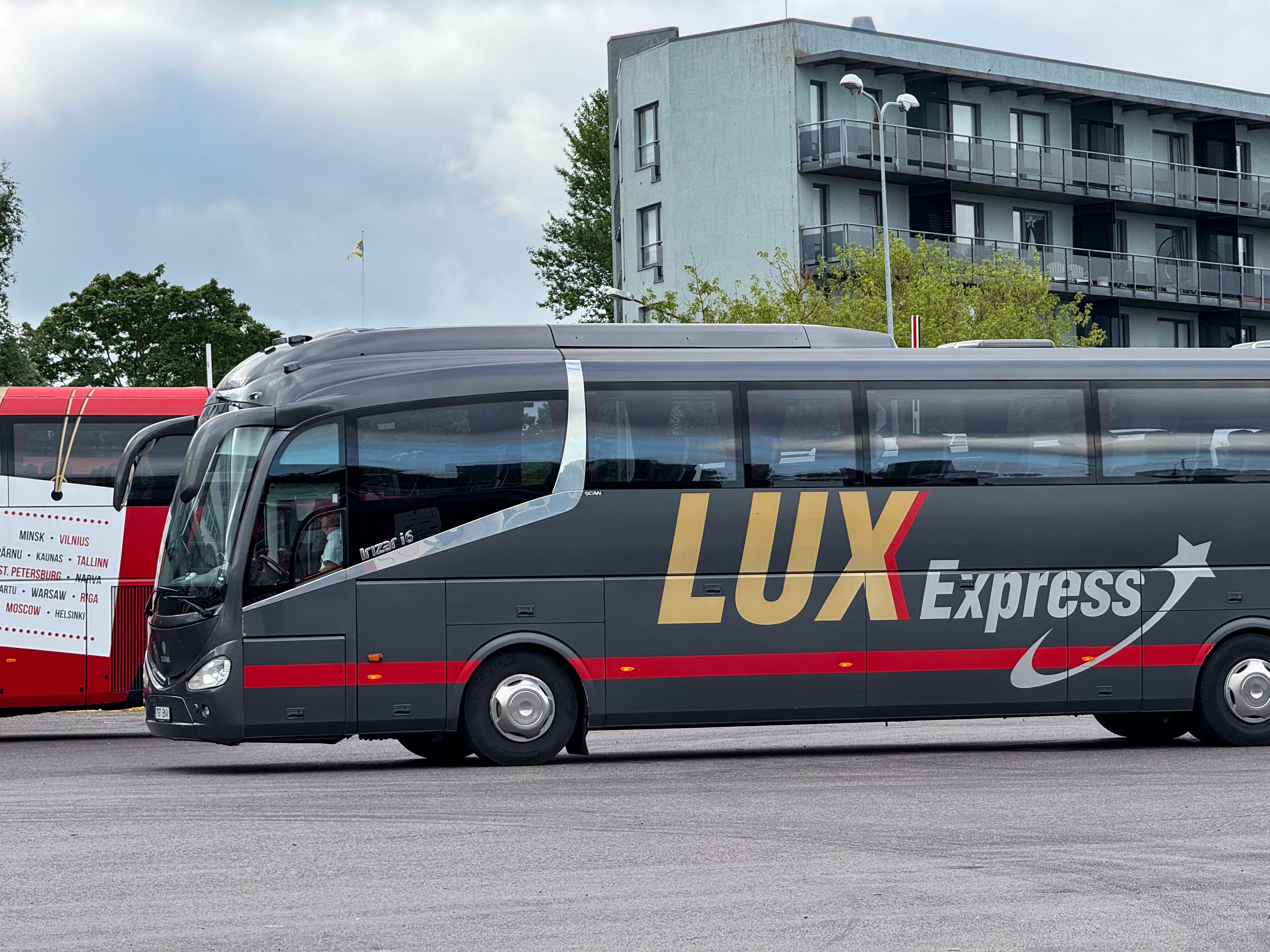
Lux Express Scania Irizar i6 bus in Tallinn (2024)

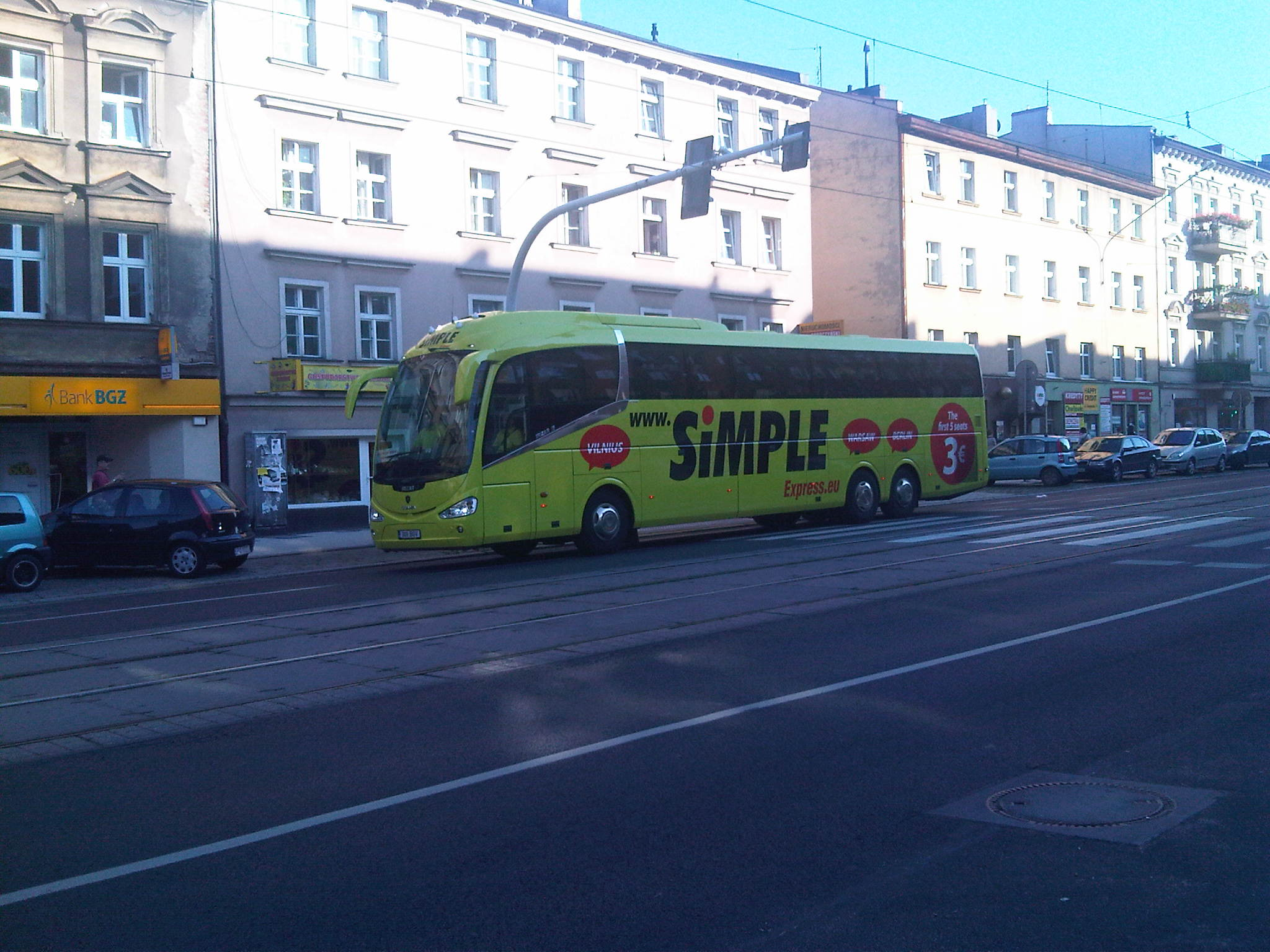
Bus operated under the former Simple Express brand

Lux Express (legally Lux Express Estonia AS) is the largest provider of international intercity coach services in the Baltic region, headquartered in Tallinn, Estonia. The company operates domestic routes in Estonia and international routes connecting the Baltic states, Poland, Finland, and Russia.

The company operates a fleet of over 100 Scania Irizar i6 and i6S buses.

== History ==
The company was established in 1994 under the name MootorReisi AS and introduced the Lux Express brand in 2008.

In 2010, the company left the Eurolines network and added a cheaper brand called "Simple Express".

In February 2020, the first case of the COVID-19 pandemic in Estonia was a passenger arriving on a Lux Express bus from Riga.

In June 2023, the company ordered 27 Scania Irizar i6S buses. The first 10 buses from the order were delivered in July 2023.

=== Accidents ===
- In January 2016, a Lux Express bus crashed between Jõhvi and Tartu when it was forced off the road due to strong wind. Twelve passengers and the driver were hospitalised.
- In February 2016, a Lux Express bus en-route from St. Petersburg to Riga collided with a truck on a road covered in black ice, killing the bus driver.
- In October 2022, a Lux Express bus en-route from St. Petersburg to Riga collided with a truck, killing the bus driver.
- In February 2025 a Lux Express bus on the route from Tallinn to St. Petersburg collided with a snow plough near Ivangorod, and two passengers lost their lives.
