= Nehatu, Harju County =

Village in Estonia

Coordinates: 59°26′26″N 24°55′17″E

Nehatu
- Village
- Interactive map of Nehatu
- Country: Estonia
- County: Harju County
- Parish: Jõelähtme Parish
- Time zone: UTC+2 (EET)
  - Summer (DST): UTC+3 (EEST)

Nehatu (German: Nehhat) is a village in Jõelähtme Parish, Harju County, located in northern Estonia.
