= Roslag =

Breed of sheep

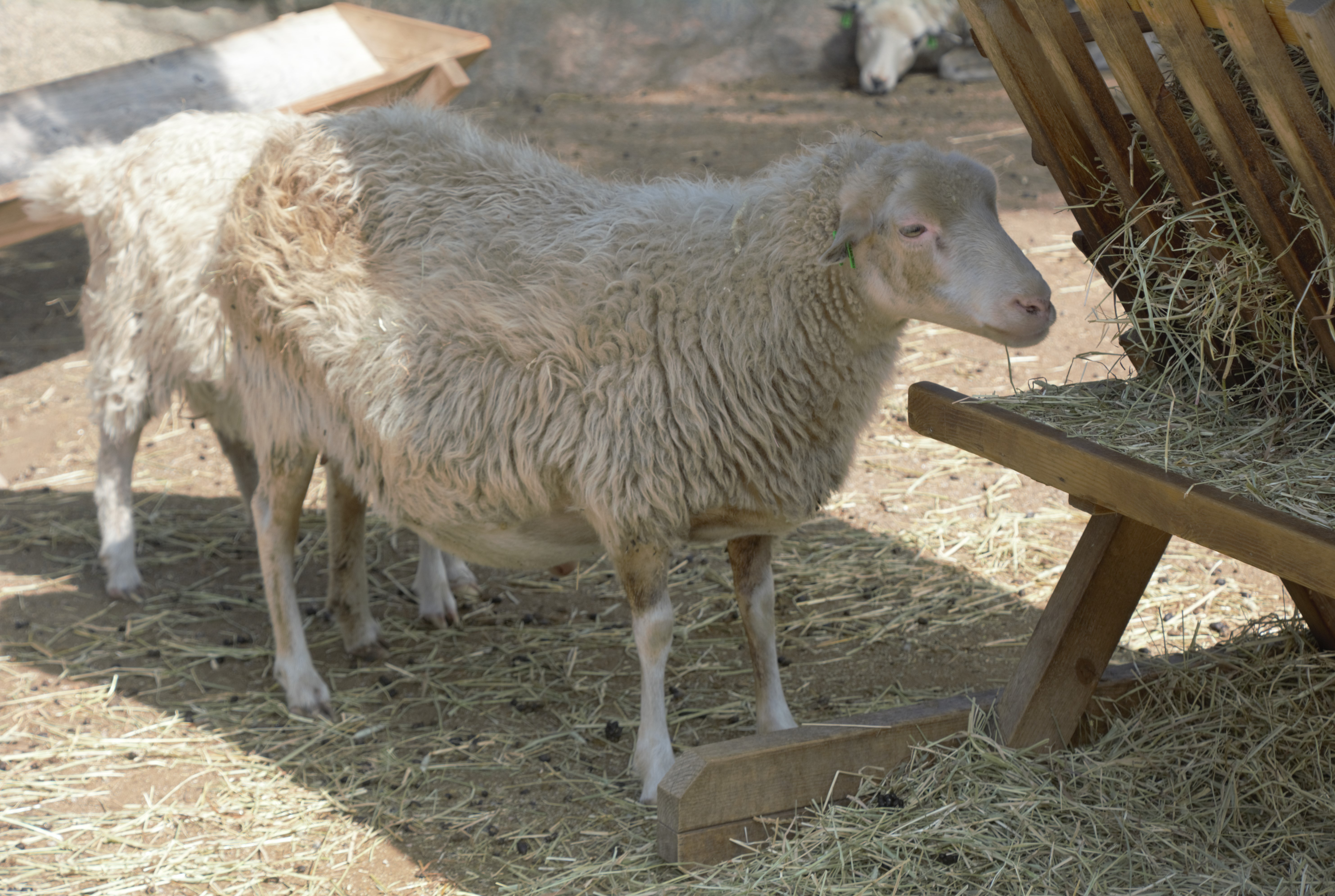
An adult Roslag sheep

The Roslag sheep (Swedish: Roslagsfår) is a breed of endangered domesticated sheep that originated in and is almost exclusively found in Sweden.

== Origins ==
Roslag sheep originate from the remnant populations of Swedish landrace breeds that used to be rather common all over the countryside, but are generally believed to have come from Raggarön in Roslagen, Sweden from where the breed takes its name.

== Appearance ==
Small and generally white or ivory colored (although 10% of the population are black or white-black bi-colored), they are a short-tailed breed who are usually used in the production of wool and meat. The wool of the Roslag sheep is a carpetwool type; with long, straight or curly guard hair and a thick cover of underwool, which can be up to 30 cm long. Only the rams of the breed are horned. Ewes can lamb throughout the entire year and usually have only one lamb, but twins do occur.

The average adult weight is only 35-40 kg (80-90 lb) for ewes and about 50 kg (110 lb) for rams.

== Genetic viability ==
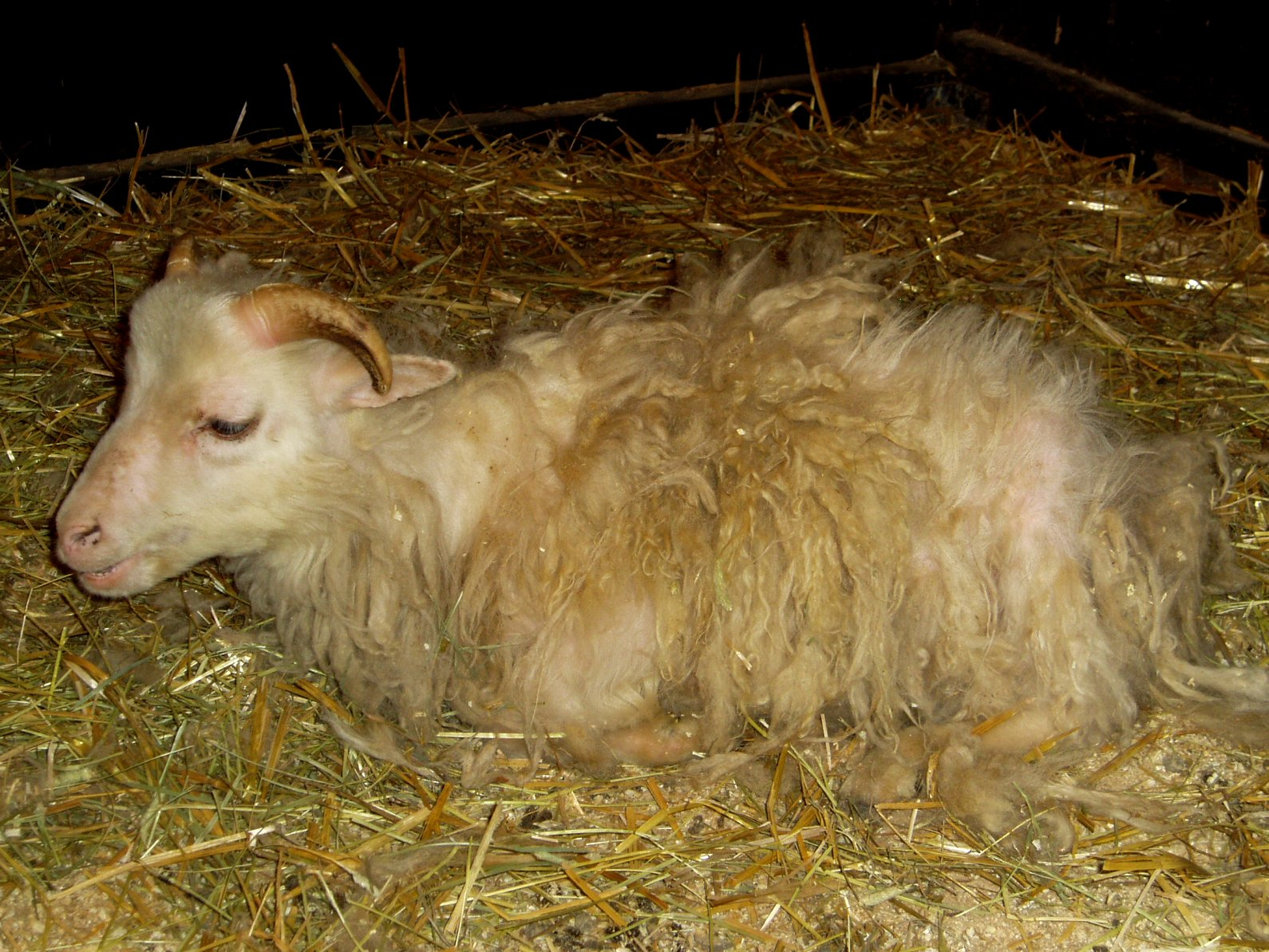
A juvenile Roslag sheep

Although there is considerable genetic variation in most of the northern European sheep breeds, Roslag sheep, as well as Dala Fur sheep (also originating in Sweden) and Estonian Ruhnu sheep exhibit the highest within-population inbreeding due to declining numbers of the breeds. A contemporary estimated number for the population of Roslag sheep by the Nordisk GenBank Husdyr is 496 individuals. Several flocks can be found at the Bokö Nature Reserve on the islands of Bokö, Brånnholmen and Långholmen alongside endangered Swedish Ringamåla cattle.

== Protection ==
The Swedish Peasant Sheep Association represents the interests of individuals breeding Roslag Sheep and is responsible for the breed's conservation. Some owners of Roslag Sheep are members of the Swedish Sheep Breeders' Association, and thus follow the breeding plan for the breed determined by the Swedish National Board of Agriculture. The Swedish Sheep Breeders' Association registers those sheep holders who are entitled to environmental subsidies for the conservation of endangered breeds.
