= Estonian Ruhnu =

Estonian breed of sheep

- Conservation status: FAO (2007): not listed; DAD-IS (2026): not listed
- Other names: Ruhnu maalammas
- Country of origin: Estonia
- Distribution: Ruhnu
- Use: meat, wool

Traits
- Weight: Male: 80 kg (180 lb); Female: 50 kg (110 lb)
- Wool color: white or cream
- Face color: greyish heads
- Horn status: ewes and 90% of rams are polled

The Estonian Ruhnu, Estonian: Ruhnu maalammas, is a traditional Estonian breed of sheep native to the small island of Ruhnu, in the Gulf of Riga in the Baltic Sea. It is one of four populations of native sheep of Estonia (Estonian: Eesti maalammas). Others are on the islands of Hiiumaa, Kihnu and Saaremaa; all fall within the Northern Short-tailed group of traditional breeds of northern Europe. There are approximately thirty of the sheep on the island of Ruhnu, kept in a single semi-feral flock.

== History ==
The Ruhnu is thought to descend from sheep left on the island of Ruhnu by Swedish-speaking inhabitants who settled on the island in the fourteenth century.

In 1944 a population of 300 sheep was documented. In the twenty-first century the population of the breed is around 30 animals. It is thought that Estonian Ruhnu sheep were originally raised for producing meat and wool.

The modern Estonian Blackhead and Estonian Whitehead derive partially from these native sheep.

== Characteristics ==
The sheep are usually white or cream-coloured with greyish head and legs; some are badger-faced. Ewes and most rams are polled, approximately 10% of rams are horned. The sheep have short or medium-length tails. Unlike most breeds of sheep, some may have wattles. The coat is double, consisting of two types of fibre. Adult rams reach a maximum weight of 80 kg and ewes 50 kg.

There is considerable genetic variation in most of the Northern Short-tailed breeds, but the Ruhnu – like the Roslag and Dala Fur of Sweden – exhibits a high level of within-population inbreeding. It has been found to be less variable than other Baltic sheep breeds, indicating the need for a breed management plan to prevent further loss of genetic variation. The population size of around 30 sheep is listed as stable. All remaining Ruhnu sheep on the island are kept in a single semi-feral flock.

== Use ==
The wool is generally used for making hand knitting yarn and clothing such as sweaters.
