= City Twins Association =

City Twins Association is an association that develops cooperation between its members. The association represents the interests of twin cities that are divided into two and between two different countries, but form a one entity in terms of population, economy and society (such as Valga in Estonia and Valka in Latvia on the Estonian-Latvian border).

City Twins Association was founded on 13.12.2006 in Imatra, Finland.

== Aims ==
The association aims to

- boost and develop cross-border cooperation among its members
- help its member's governing bodies and administrations to share experiences with each other and with other members
- find and develop better solutions for local governments that can help to develop twin towns
- create and execute cooperation projects

== Members ==
- Imatra, Finland
- Svetogorsk, Russia
- Valga, Estonia
- Valka, Latvia
- Haparanda, Sweden
- Tornio, Finland
- Narva, Estonia
- Ivangorod, Russia
- Görlitz, Germany
- Frankfurt (Oder), Germany
- Słubice, Poland
- Cieszyn, Poland
