= Valga Airfield =

Airfield in Estonia

Valga Airfield Valga lennuväli
- IATA: none; ICAO: none

Summary
- Airport type: ~~Military~~
- Operator: ~~Soviet Air Force~~
- Location: Jaanikese, near Valga
- Elevation AMSL: 239 ft (73 m)
- Coordinates: 57°48′48″N 026°04′36″E

Map
- Location in Estonia

Runways
Direction	Length		Surface
Direction	m	ft	Surface
	~~2,000~~	~~6,562~~	~~Grass~~
- Sources: Forgotten Airports

Valga is a former Soviet air base in Estonia located in Jaanikese, 4 km (2.5 mi) northeast of Valga. It was listed on the 1974 Department of Defense Global Navigation Chart No. 3 as having jet facilities. It has mostly been plowed under into farmland. It is only 1 km (0.62 mi) from the Latvian border.

Long before the Soviet jet facilities were established here, the field was a known hub for Estonian civil glider and light aviation training (purilennukid) during the first independence period between 1937 and 1939.
