= Valga, Estonia =

Town in Estonia

Valga
- Town
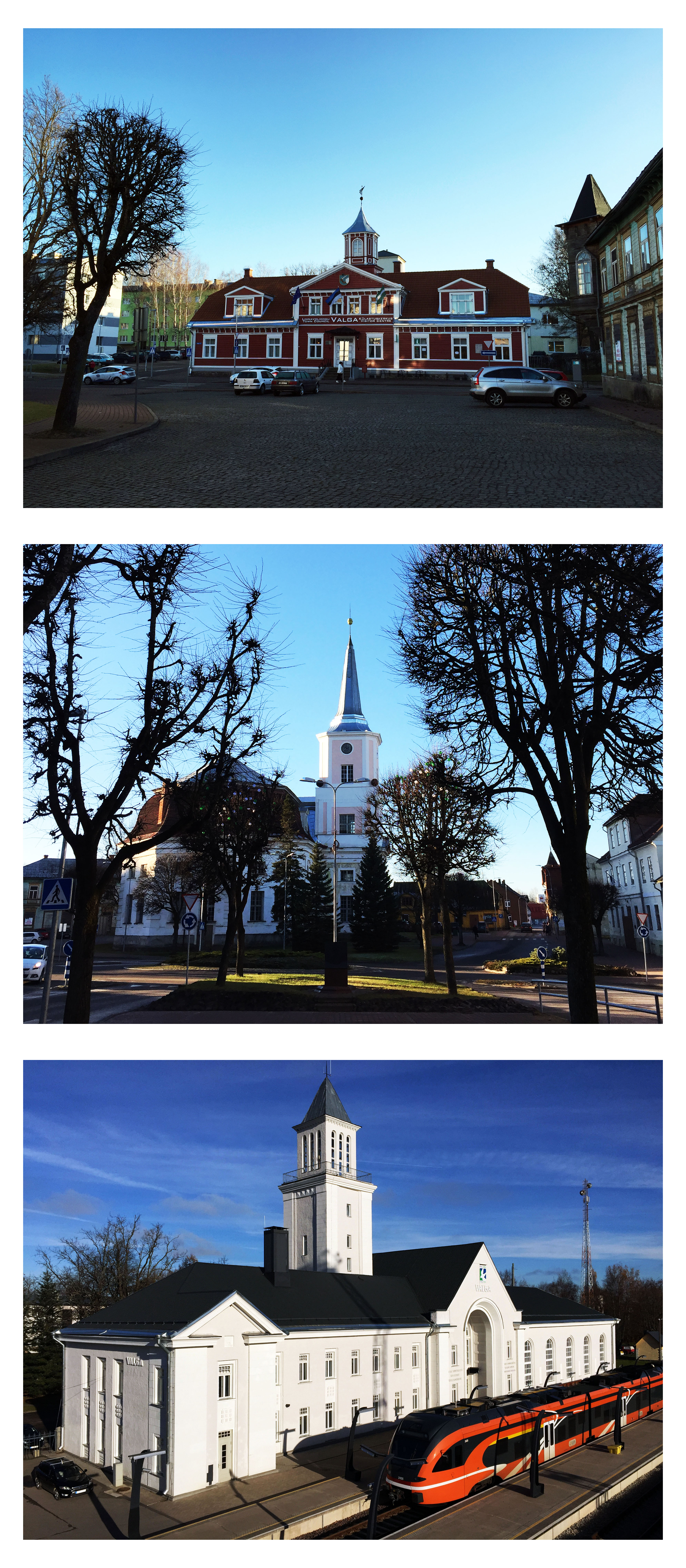
- Valga Town Hall, Jaani (St. John´s) Church and Railway Station

- Flag Coat of arms
- Motto: 1 linn, 2 riiki (1 city, 2 countries)
- Location in Estonia
- Coordinates: 57°47′N 26°02′E
- Country: Estonia
- County: Valga County
- Municipality: Valga Parish
- First mention: 1286

Area
  - Total: 16.54 km^{2} (6.39 sq mi)
- Elevation: 65 m (213 ft)

Population (2026)
  - Total: 11,732
  - Rank: 12th
  - Density: 709.3/km^{2} (1,837/sq mi)

Ethnicity (2021)
  - Estonians: 59.2%
  - Russians: 26.3%
  - Latvians: 5.65%
  - Ukrainians: 3.02%
  - other: 5.83%
- Time zone: UTC+2 (EET)
  - Summer (DST): UTC+3 (EEST)
- Postal code: 68230

Valga (German: Walk; Latvian: Valka) is a town in southern Estonia and the capital of Valga County and Valga Parish. Until their separation in 1920, Valga and the town of Valka in northern Latvia were one town. They are now twin-towns. The area of Valga is 16.5 square kilometres (6.4 square miles). The population is 12,261. On 21 December 2007 all border-crossing points were removed and roads and fences opened between the two countries with both countries joining the Schengen Agreement.

Valga downtown

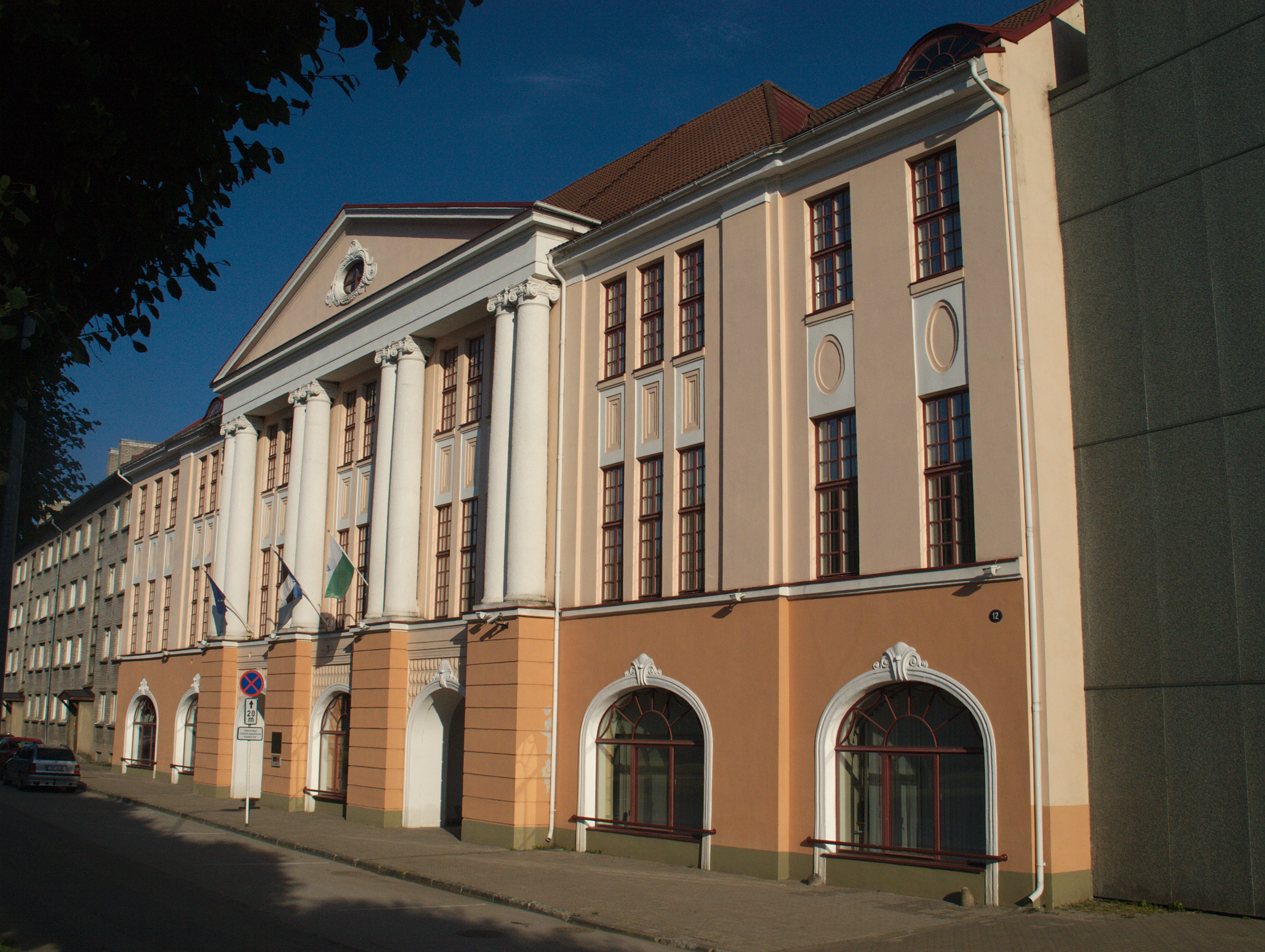
The building of the former German bank

== Location and transport ==
The distance to Tartu is 89 km (55 mi), Pärnu 144 km (89 mi), Tallinn 245 km (152 mi), Riga 175 km (109 mi) and Pskov 170 km (106 mi).

Valga is situated at the junction of roads and railways.

The Valga-Võru-Koidula railway runs to the town but the passenger train service has been interrupted since 2001. Freight trains on the Valga-Võru-Koidula line have been cut back significantly after the Russian invasion of Ukraine.

The Tartu-Valga railway line also serves this station. After closing April 2008 for extensive repair work Edelaraudtee railway services from other parts of Estonia to Valga re-opened in January 2010.

With the expansion of the Schengen Agreement and the abolition of systematic border controls between Estonia and Latvia, it was announced that common public bus transport would be launched between Valga and Valka.

As of 2025, city bus number 3, operated by the Estonian company ATG Bussiliinid OÜ, connects the twin cities of Valga and Valka three times a day, departing from the Valga train station.

During the Cold War, Valga was home to Valga air base.

== Districts of Valga ==
There are six districts of Valga:

- Kesklinn
- Laatsi
- Pilpaküla
- Puraküla
- Kapsamõisa (Raudteetaguse)
- Tambre.

== Activity ==
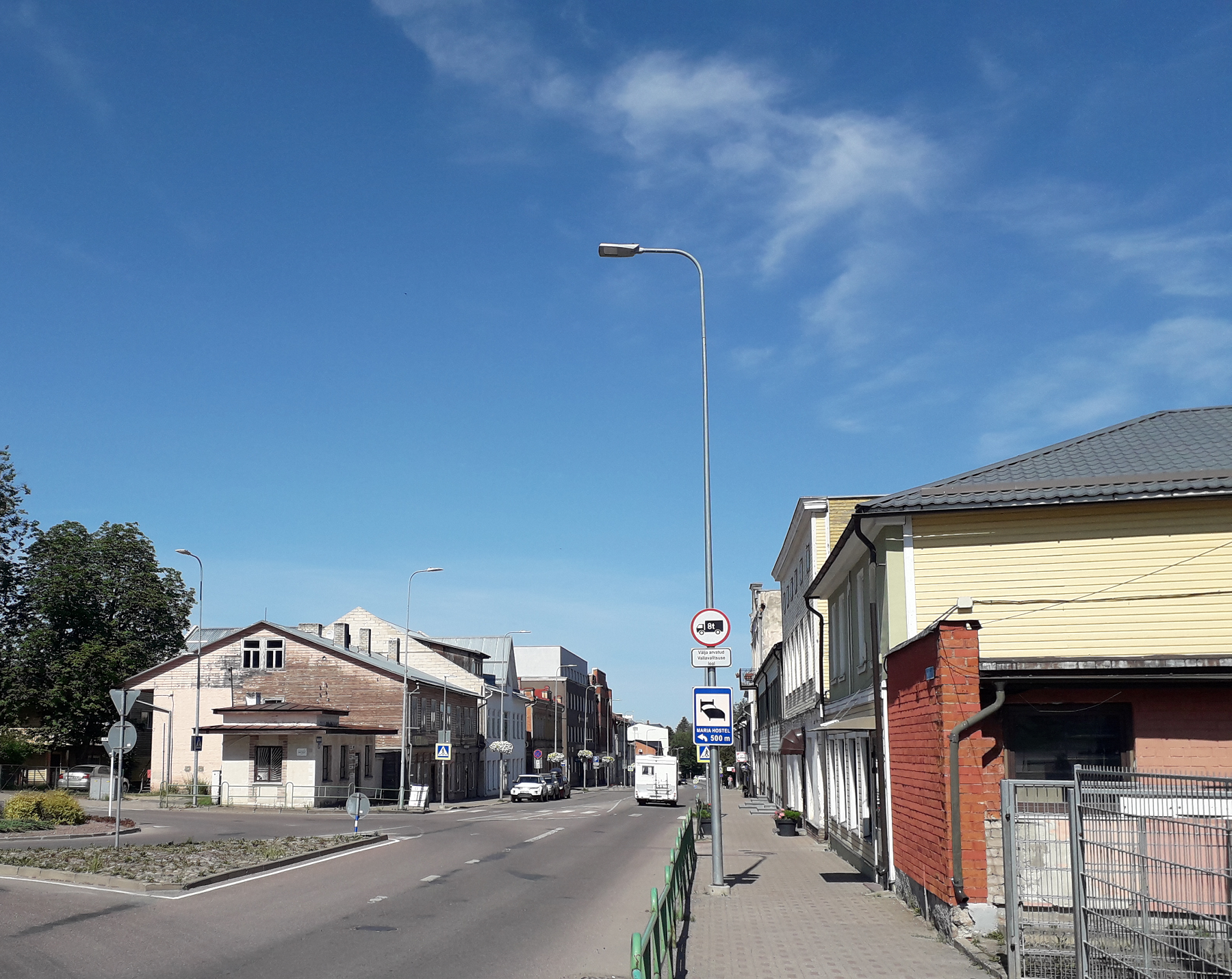
One of the main streets

Since 1944, a local newspaper, Valgamaalane, has been published (3 times a week). Since 2003, there has also been a local newspaper "Walk" (in the Russian language). There also is a local correspondence office of Estonian Television (Eesti Televisioon) and a local radio – "Raadio Ruut".

The former urban municipality of Valga (until 2017) maintained partnerships with many towns, mostly in foreign countries, which are listed in a special subsection below.

Valga is developing quickly. Since 1996, the populace's quality of life has improved due to the renovation of several buildings, including the Central Library, Valga Stadium, the Museum, Valga Hospital, and the Culture and Hobby Centre. Step by step, the schools and kindergartens are also being modernized. Since 2003, a new water treatment plant has improved the quality of water in the town. The most important industry is the food industry, which accounts for about half of the town's industrial output. Of lesser importance are the clothing and footwear industry, and metalworking. In the private sector, there have been extensive investments in trade, light industry, and forestry.

== Demographics ==
Ethnic composition 1922-2021
Ethnicity	1922		1934		1941		1970		1979		1989		2000		2011		2021	
Ethnicity	amount	%	amount	%	amount	%	amount	%	amount	%	amount	%	amount	%	amount	%	amount	%
Estonians	6997	74.0	8919	82.3	7941	88.9	9635	57.4	10052	54.4	9383	52.9	8970	62.6	7886	64.3	7110	59.2
Russians	443	4.69	368	3.39	209	2.34	5241	31.2	6164	33.4	6140	34.6	3913	27.3	3224	26.3	3160	26.3
Ukrainians	-	-	6	0.06	-	-	554	3.30	766	4.15	720	4.06	421	2.94	386	3.15	363	3.02
Belarusians	-	-	-	-	-	-	170	1.01	322	1.74	307	1.73	211	1.47	156	1.27	159	1.32
Finns	-	-	1	0.01	7	0.08	121	0.72	136	0.74	126	0.71	99	0.69	55	0.45	40	0.33
Jews	393	4.16	262	2.42	0	0.00	73	0.43	31	0.17	24	0.14	13	0.09	7	0.06	3	0.02
Latvians	-	-	1037	9.56	606	6.79	382	2.27	448	2.43	456	2.57	334	2.33	262	2.14	679	5.65
Germans	182	1.92	143	1.32	-	-	-	-	273	1.48	241	1.36	36	0.25	27	0.22	34	0.28
Tatars	-	-	0	0.00	-	-	-	-	28	0.15	27	0.15	18	0.13	13	0.11	10	0.08
Poles	-	-	35	0.32	20	0.22	-	-	68	0.37	68	0.38	35	0.24	24	0.20	15	0.12
Lithuanians	-	-	6	0.06	4	0.04	34	0.20	24	0.13	41	0.23	32	0.22	29	0.24	23	0.19
unknown	13	0.14	18	0.17	4	0.04	0	0.00	0	0.00	0	0.00	46	0.32	30	0.24	102	0.85
other	1427	15.1	47	0.43	139	1.56	585	3.48	162	0.88	189	1.07	195	1.36	162	1.32	312	2.60
Total	9455	100	10842	100	8930	100	16795	100	18474	100	17722	100	14323	100	12261	100	12010	100

Year	1881	1897	1922	1934	1959	1970	1979	1989	2000	2011	2017	2021
Population	4,200	10,900	9,500	10,800	13,300	17,000	18,500	17,700	14,323	12,261	12,452	12,010

Population of Valga by first language
Language	2000 census		2011 census		2021 census	
Language	Number	%	Number	%	Number	%
Estonian	8,772	61.24	7,573	61.77	6,818	56.76
Russian	4,744	33.12	4,113	33.55	4,095	34.09
Latvian	259	1.81	191	1.56	531	4.42
Ukrainian	192	1.34	159	1.30	134	1.12
Belarusian	75	0.52	23	0.19	24	0.20
Total	14,323		12,261		12,010	

== Sports ==
Valga is home to several notable Estonian sports teams.

Warrior Valga is a football club that currently plays in the III liiga. Warrior Valga played in the Meistriliiga from 2003 to 2006.

Valga is a basketball club that currently plays in the Estonian top-tier Korvpalli Meistriliiga and the Baltic Basketball League.

== Climate ==
Valga lies within the temperate humid continental climate zone.

Climate data for Valga (normals 1991–2020, extremes 1925–present)
Month	Jan	Feb	Mar	Apr	May	Jun	Jul	Aug	Sep	Oct	Nov	Dec	Year
Record high °C (°F)	10.1 (50.2)	10.9 (51.6)	21.3 (70.3)	27.8 (82.0)	30.7 (87.3)	33.2 (91.8)	34.4 (93.9)	34.3 (93.7)	29.5 (85.1)	21.7 (71.1)	15.2 (59.4)	11.9 (53.4)	34.4 (93.9)
Mean daily maximum °C (°F)	−1.6 (29.1)	−1.1 (30.0)	3.8 (38.8)	11.6 (52.9)	17.7 (63.9)	21.2 (70.2)	23.6 (74.5)	22.2 (72.0)	16.6 (61.9)	9.5 (49.1)	3.5 (38.3)	0.1 (32.2)	10.6 (51.1)
Daily mean °C (°F)	−4.0 (24.8)	−4.3 (24.3)	−0.4 (31.3)	6.0 (42.8)	11.6 (52.9)	15.6 (60.1)	18.0 (64.4)	16.5 (61.7)	11.6 (52.9)	5.9 (42.6)	1.3 (34.3)	−2.0 (28.4)	6.3 (43.3)
Mean daily minimum °C (°F)	−6.6 (20.1)	−7.4 (18.7)	−4.2 (24.4)	0.9 (33.6)	5.5 (41.9)	10.0 (50.0)	12.6 (54.7)	11.5 (52.7)	7.3 (45.1)	2.8 (37.0)	−0.9 (30.4)	−4.2 (24.4)	2.3 (36.1)
Record low °C (°F)	−38.5 (−37.3)	−38.2 (−36.8)	−30.1 (−22.2)	−17.8 (0.0)	−5.6 (21.9)	−1.6 (29.1)	2.5 (36.5)	1.5 (34.7)	−6.5 (20.3)	−14.4 (6.1)	−21.9 (−7.4)	−40.5 (−40.9)	−40.5 (−40.9)
Average precipitation mm (inches)	52 (2.0)	42 (1.7)	38 (1.5)	37 (1.5)	52 (2.0)	82 (3.2)	67 (2.6)	78 (3.1)	53 (2.1)	71 (2.8)	56 (2.2)	50 (2.0)	675 (26.6)
Average precipitation days (≥ 1.0 mm)	11.6	9.8	9.2	8.0	9.0	10.4	9.8	10.4	9.2	12.0	11.4	12.4	123.2
Average relative humidity (%)	89	86	78	70	68	73	76	79	84	87	90	90	81
Source: Estonian Weather Service

== History ==
- 1286: Valga (under German name Walk) appears for the first time in the credit register of the city of Riga.
- 1298, 1329, 1345: Walk suffers from looting raids made by Lithuanians who are led by Grand Duke Gediminas and Algirdas on the second and third occasions.
- 1419: Walk becomes the seat of the Landtag of the Livonian Confederation.
- 1481: A raid by Russians; the settlement burns down for the fourth time.
- 1500: Walk, a settlement in the heart of Old Livonia that is not fortified, is chosen as the location for town assembly days 36 times up to 1500.
- 1501: During another raid by Russians the settlement gets burnt down for the fifth time.
- 1558: During the Livonian War the medieval settlement of Walk is completely destroyed.
- 1584 11 June: Valga is granted the same charter and byelaws as Riga by Stefan Batory, the King of Poland.
- 1590 17 April: The King of Poland, Sigismund III Vasa, ratifies the charter for the second time. Valga is granted its city arms.
- 1600: The first town map, showing 42 house properties. The town is 7 km (4 mi) long and between 0.25 to 0.5 km (0.2 to 0.3 mi) wide.
- 1626: After the Polish-Swedish War Valga becomes the subject of Sweden. On 6 March, King Gustavus Adolphus of Sweden confirms the existing privileges.
- 1657: On 9 July, a Swedish army under Friedrich von Löwen defeats a Russian army under Scheremetchev in the Battle of Walk.
- 1721: As the result of the Great Northern War, Valga is subjected to Russian rule together with the rest of Estonia.
- 1764 5 October: Empress Catherine II confirms the town's privileges.
- 1783: During the Regency of Catherine II the Valga County (Kreis Walk) is formed.
- 1780: The first stone buildings are erected: a church, a school and county offices.
- 1789: Land surveyor O.S. Engell drafts the map of Valga showing 76 plots with houses.
- 1816: The building of St. John's Church is finished.
- 1819: 451 inhabitants lived in the town (79.6% of them Germans, 10.0% Latvians, 7.5% Russians and 2.9% Estonians)
- 1876: Walkscher Anzeiger, the first newspaper in Valga, in German, is issued.
- 1889: Valga Railway Station is opened. On 22 July the Tartu-Valga railway line is officially opened.
- 1890 16 December: The Valga Temperance Society is founded.
- 1896: The Pärnu-Valga narrow-gauge railway is opened.
- 1901 7 December: Together with Latvians, Estonians succeed in winning the elections over Baltic Germans in Valga – the first occasion on Estonian territory. The chemist Johannes Märtson is elected mayor.
- 1902: In the building of the Temperance Society the social society Säde is founded; Andres Alver, the county medical officer, is elected chairman. The Valga-Marienburg narrow-gauge railway is opened.
- 1908 24 June: Estonian military commander Alfons Rebane is born in Valga.
- 1908: The Girls' Progymnasium is changed into the Gymnasium with Marta Pärna as principal.
- 1909: The construction of the Säde building is begun (architect Georg Hellat).
- 1913: 16194 inhabitants lived in the town (51% of them Estonians, 25.1% Latvians, 15.5% Russians, 4.0% Germans, 2.1% Jewish).
- 1917: A German zeppelin flies over the town and drops forty high-explosive bombs without hitting the main target, the railway station.
- 1918 11 January: The Council of Delegates of Valga County Workers, Soldiers and Landless Men gains power in the town. On 12 February the German Army occupies Valga.
- 1919 11 January: The Valga Estonian Gymnasium is opened at 22 Kesk Street. For the first time in the history of secondary education in Valga the teaching language is Estonian instead of German. At the end of January, 107 victims of Bolshevik acts of terror are found in five mass graves around Valga; 67 people are taken away as hostages. On 31 January the Battle of Paju takes place and consequently Valga is freed from the Bolsheviks.

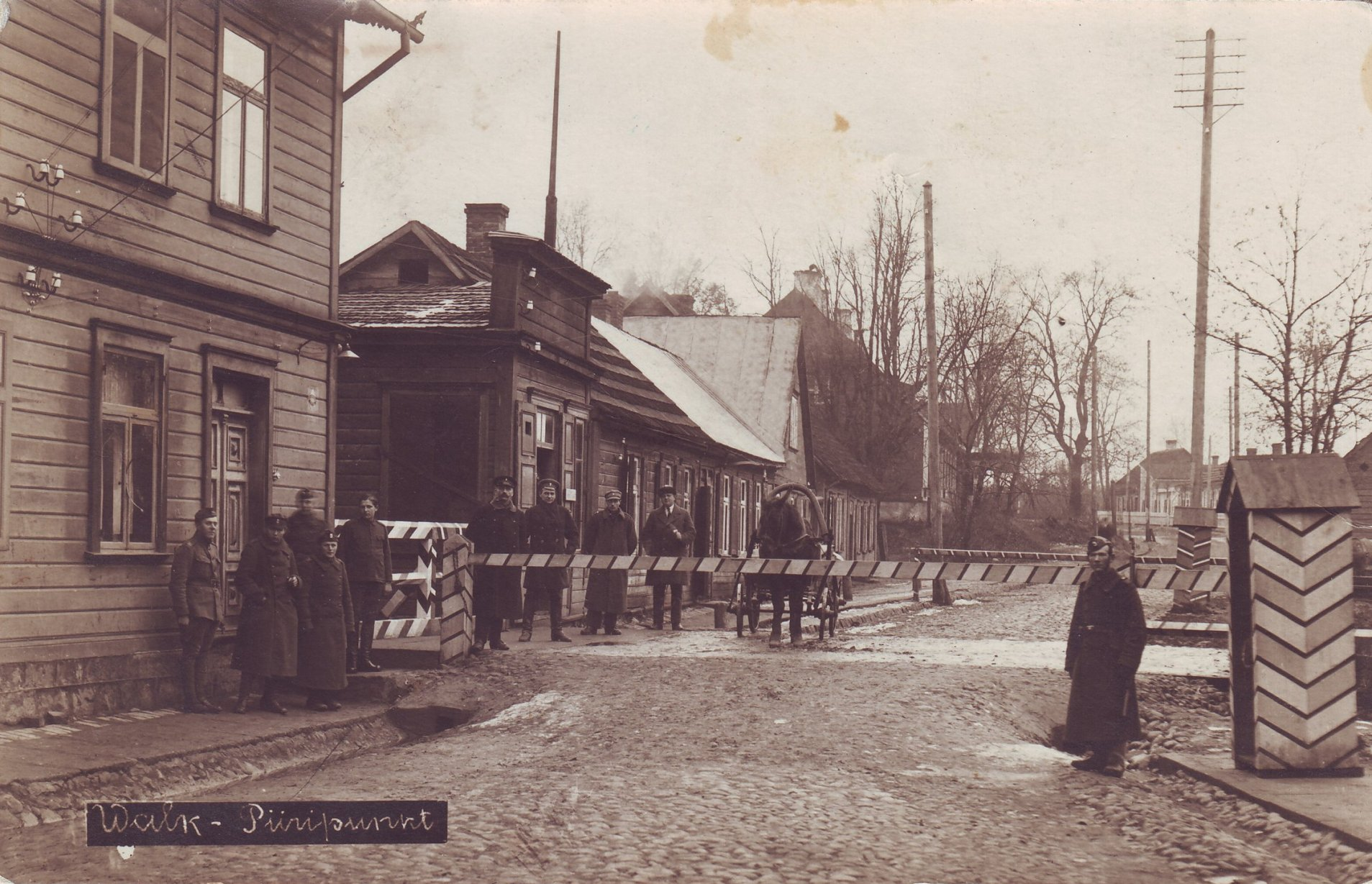
Border crossing between Valga, Estonia and Valka, Latvia in the 1920s

- 1920 1 July: The British envoy Colonel S. G. Tallents conclusively establishes the border between Estonia and Latvia, putting an end to their disputes and the city of Valga is divided into Estonian and Latvian areas based on ethnicity. Valga proper, as far as Konnaoja and Luke graveyard, remains intact under Estonian rule.
- 1921 11 February: The decree of the Estonian government establishes the territory of Valga county. Valga becomes a county centre.
- 1940 17 June: The Soviet occupation begins and with it the political repressions against Estonians and Latvians in Valga/Valka, including the mass deportations in June 1941.
- 1941 9 July: Valga is occupied by German troops.
- 1944
  - Dulag 110 transit prisoner-of-war camp relocated from Tapa to Valga, and then further relocated to Chełm in German-occupied Poland after a few months.
  - 19 September: In the course of heavy fighting Valga is liberated from the German occupation of Estonia. It is immediately replaced by the Soviet occupation of Estonia.
- 1988. The Valga Society for the Protection of Antiquities is founded. On 27 November, on the initiative of the Society, the beginning of the War of Liberation is commemorated at the memorial for those killed in the war.
- 1989 24 February: The first Estonian flag of the re-established independence period is hoisted on the flagpole of 12 Aia Street.
- 1992 24 May: The Russian army base in Valga is taken over, and later on becomes the border guard's post.
- 1993 17 October: The first free elections of the municipal council after the restoration of independence take place.
- 1994 31 January: On the 75th anniversary of the battle of Paju a memorial to it is opened. On 21–25 June, worldwide days of Valga county people take place.

== International relations ==
=== Twin towns – Sister cities ===
The former urban municipality of Valga (until 2017), Estonia was twinned with:

- Durbuy, Belgium
- Hallsberg, Sweden
- Haparanda, Sweden
- Tvrdošin, Slovakia
- Kobylnica, Poland
- Kościelisko, Poland
- Lübz, Germany
- Weissenburg-Gunzenhausen, Germany
- Oakland, United States
- Orimattila, Finland
- Tornio, Finland
- Uusikaupunki, Finland
- Valka, Latvia
- Valga, Spain
- Östhammar, Sweden
- Pskov, Russia
- Novoye Devyatkino, Russia

=== City Twins Association ===
The former urban municipality of Valga (until 2017) was a founding member of City Twins Association that was founded in Imatra, Finland on 13 December 2006. In addition to sister towns, Valga had a cooperation through the association with following cities:

- Imatra, Finland
- Svetogorsk, Russia
- Narva, Estonia
- Ivangorod, Russia
- Görlitz, Germany
- Frankfurt (Oder), Germany
- Słubice, Poland
- Cieszyn, Poland

=== Cooperation without any formal agreement ===
- Vejle, Denmark
- Sátoraljaújhely, Hungary

== Notable residents ==
- Jaan Mahlapuu (1894–1917), military pilot
- Paul Viiding (1904–1962), poet, author and literary critic.
- Alfons Rebane (1908–1976), military commander, led the local part of Operation Jungle
- Kazimierz Świątek (1914–2011), first cardinal of the Roman Catholic Church in independent Belarus
- Heinrich Schultz (1924–2012), a cultural functionary, son of a Baltic German the organizer of international jazz festivals in Tallinn.
- Silvia Laidla (1927–2012), a stage, TV and film actress
- Peeter Lilje (1950–1993), conductor of the Estonian National Symphony Orchestra
- Margus Lepik (born 1969), politician; former mayor of Valga
- Sakarias Jaan Leppik (born 1969), priest of the Estonian Apostolic Orthodox Church, composer, culture analyst, theatre and film critic.

=== Sport ===
- Jaan Kikkas (1892–1944), middleweight weightlifter, bronze medallist at the 1924 Summer Olympics
- Alfred Neuland (1895–1966), weightlifter and the first Olympic gold medalist from Estonia at the 1920 Summer Olympics
- Bruno Junk (1929–1995), race walker, bronze medallist at the 1952 & 1956 Summer Olympics

== Gallery ==
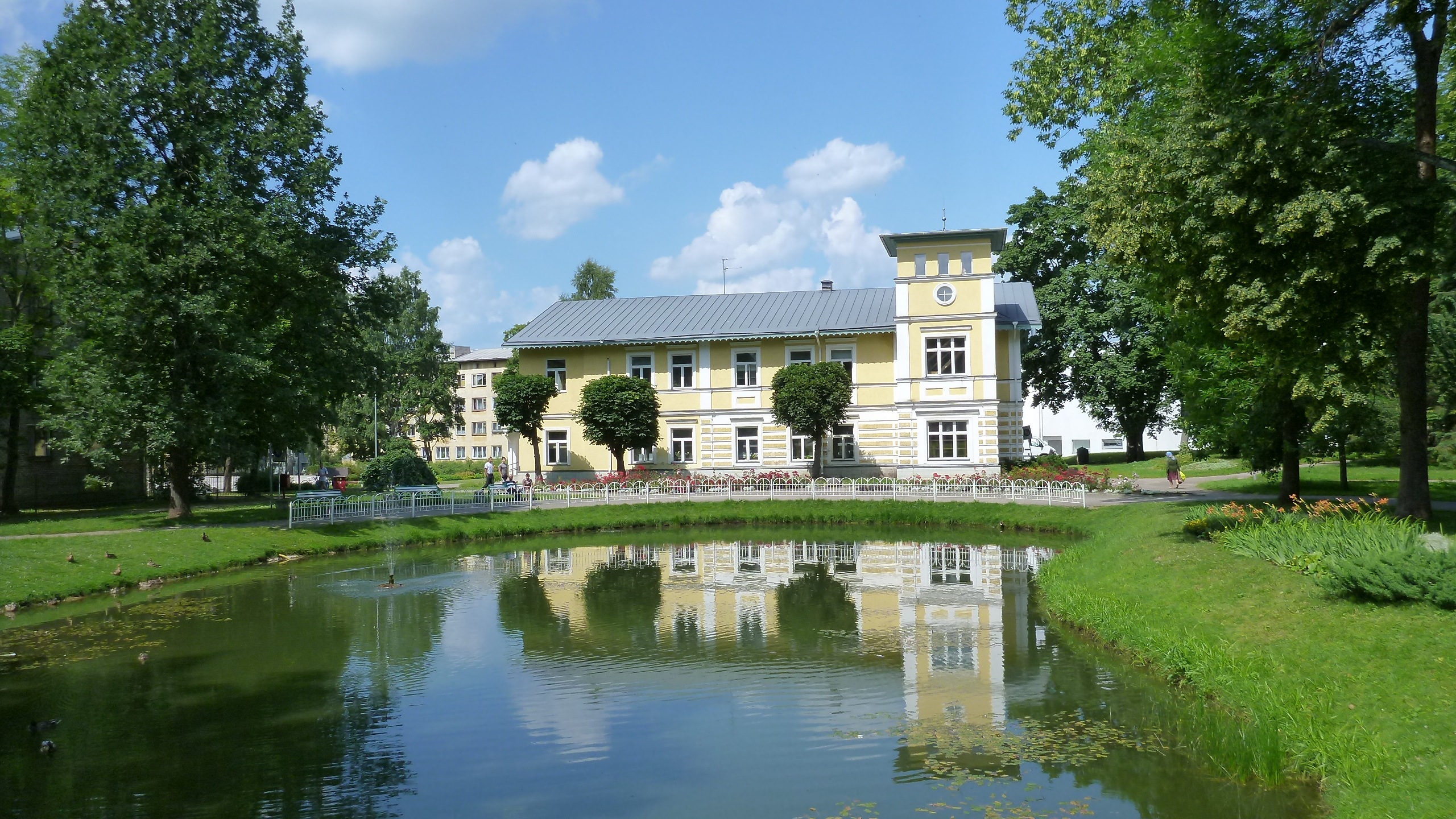
Valga main library

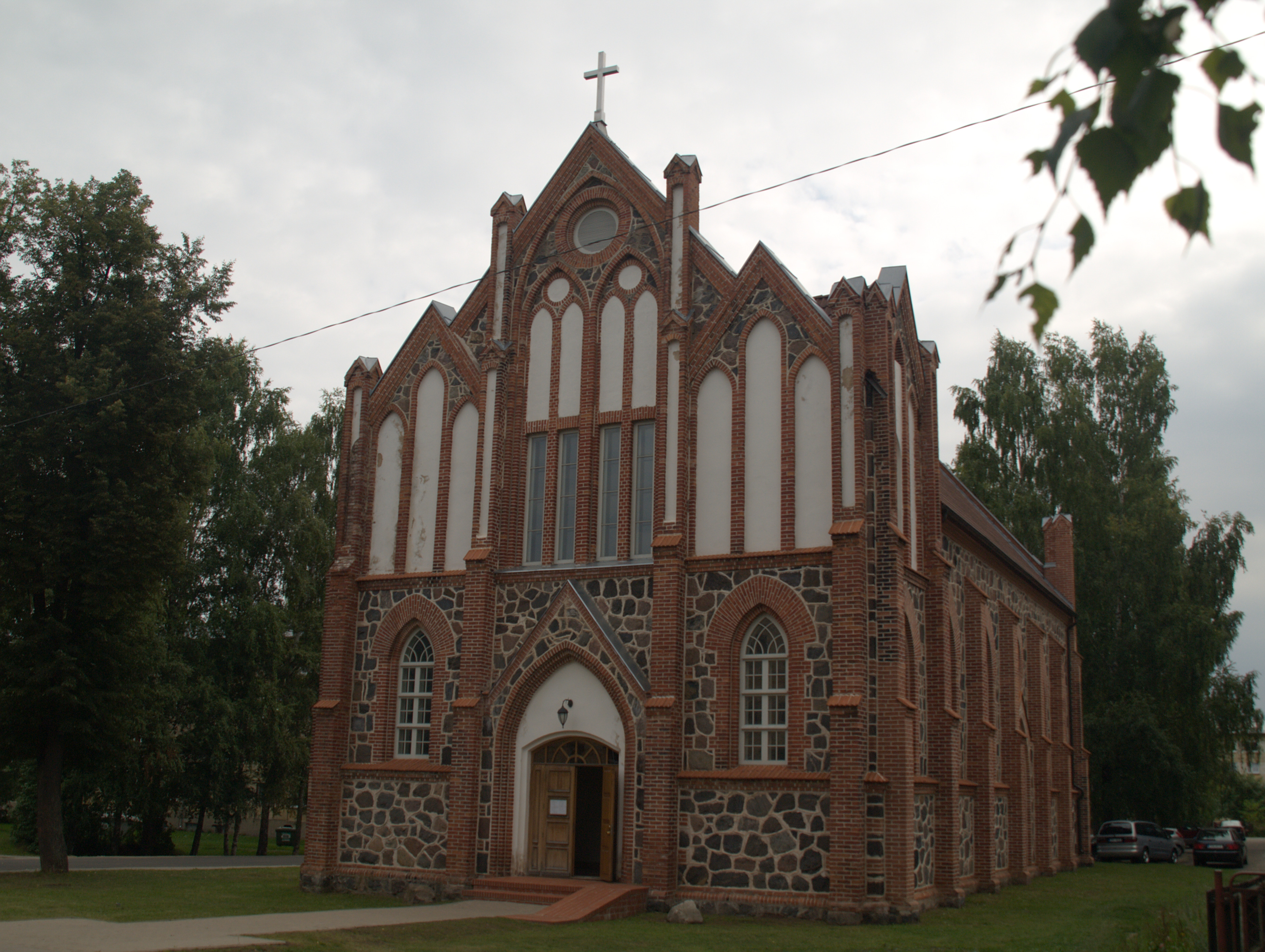
Church of the Holy Spirit

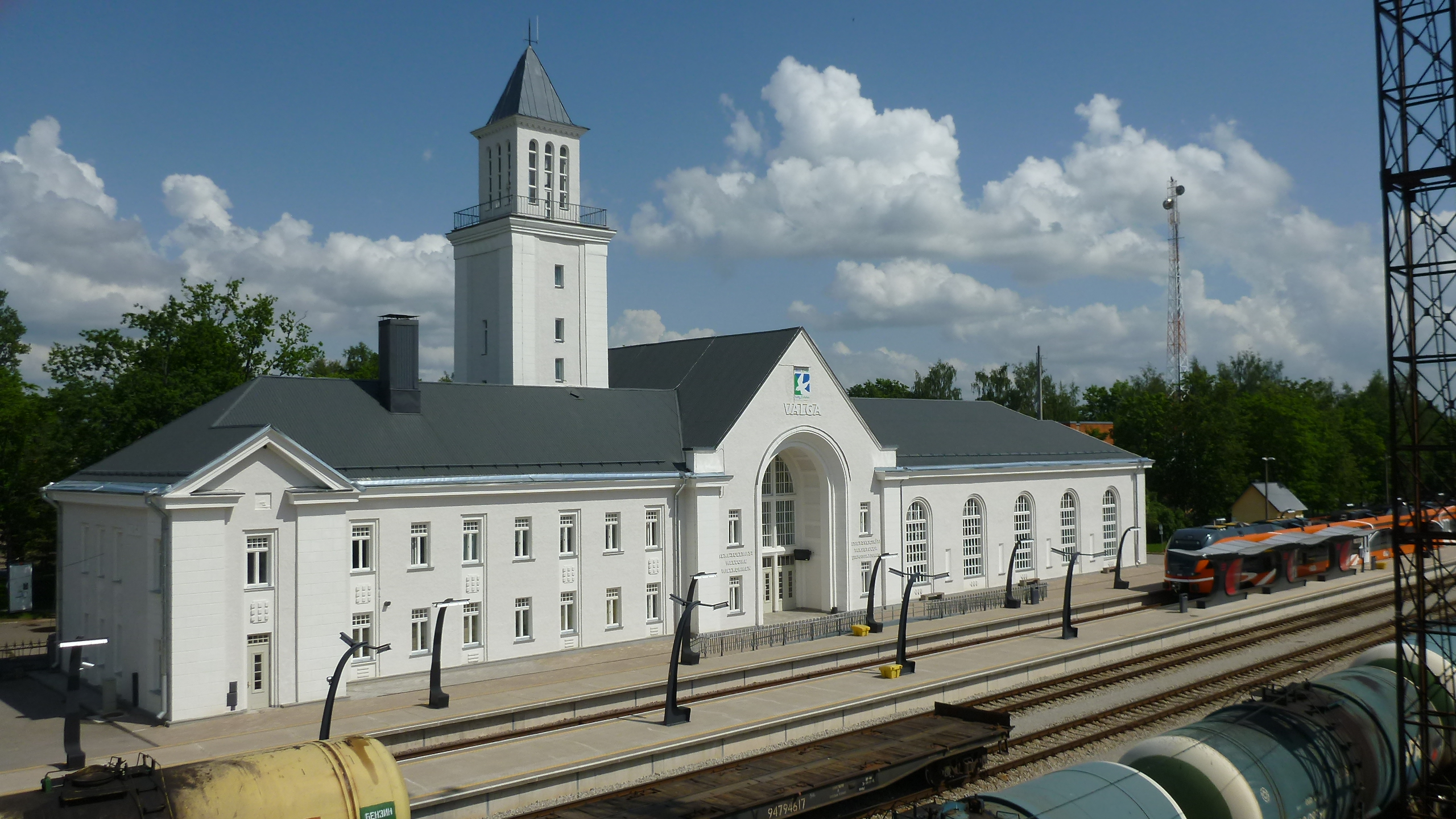
Valga railway station

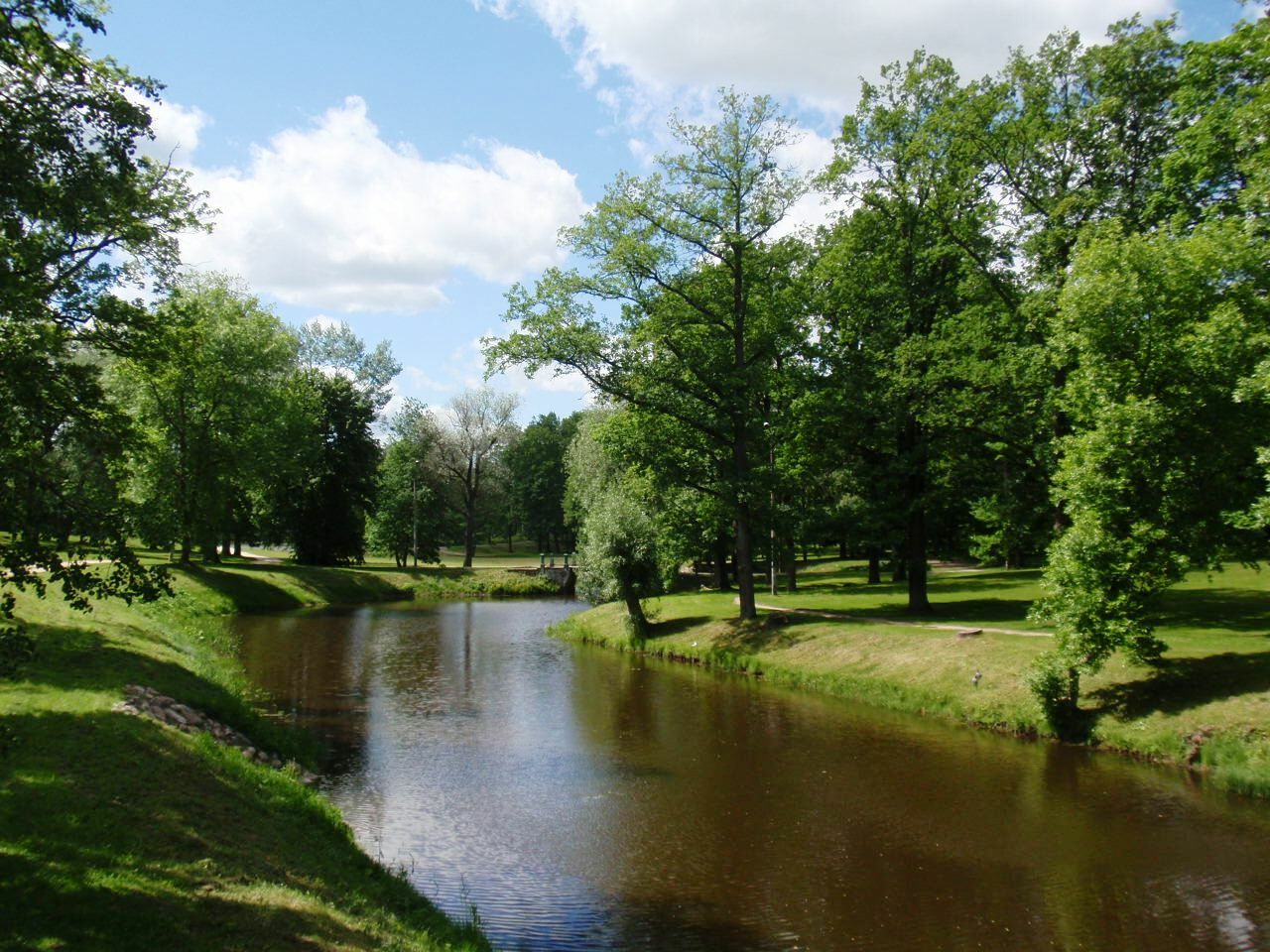
Valga Linnapark

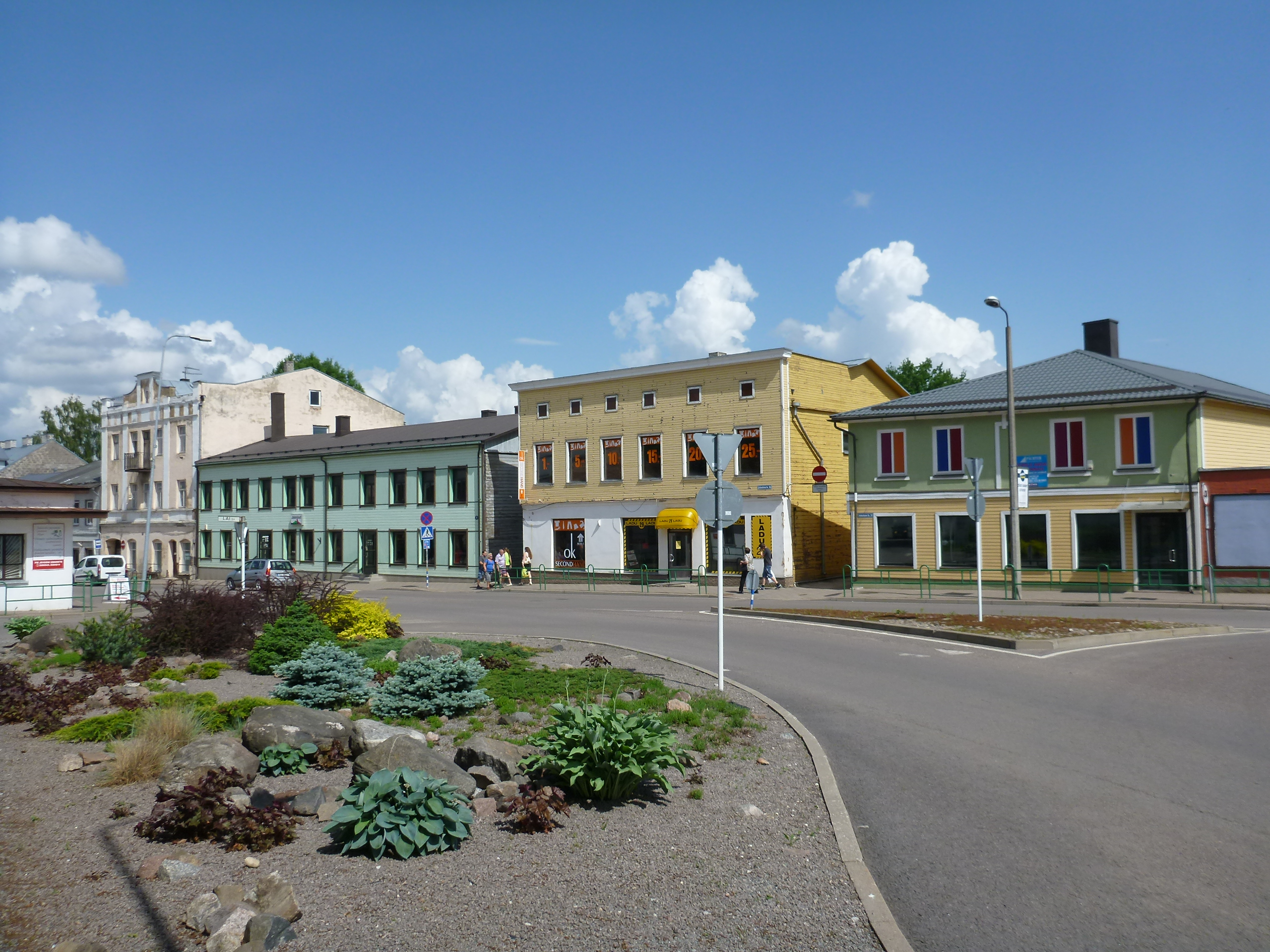
Vabaduse street

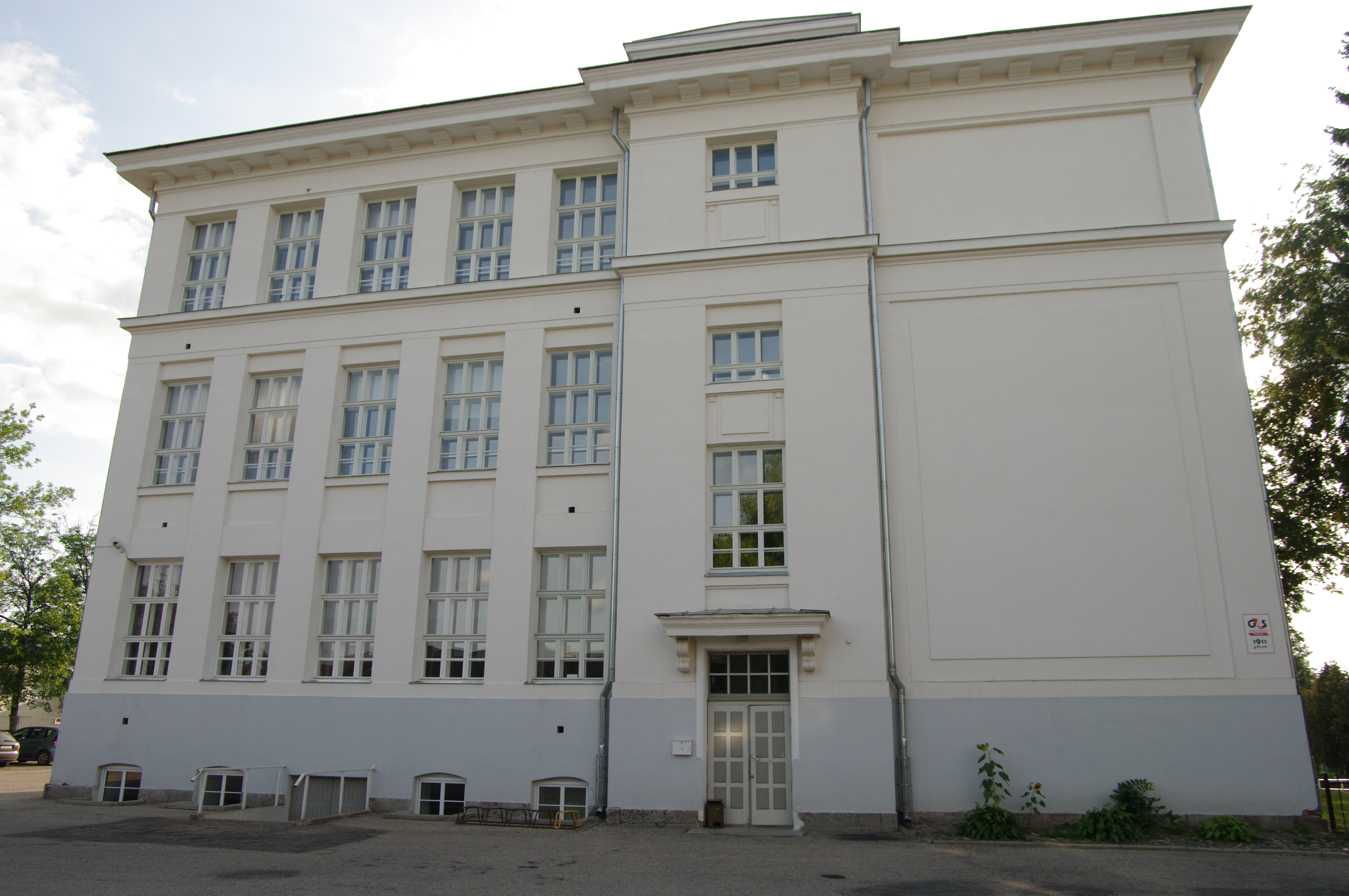
Valga gymnasium

An Art Nouveau residential building on Julius Kuperjanov Street.

Current railway services
Preceding station	Elron	Following station
Sangaste towards Tallinn	Tallinn–Tartu–Valga	Terminus
International services
Preceding station	LTG Link	Following station
Tallinn, Estonia Terminus	Vilnius—Riga—Tallinn	Riga, Latvia towards Vilnius
