= Jaan Mahlapuu =

Estonian WW1 aviator

Jaan M. Mahlapuu
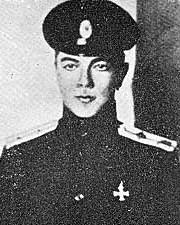
- Jaan Mahlapuu in his uniform, wearing a Cross of St George, taken around 1916
- Born: 9 November 1894; Valga, Estonia
- Died: 3 August 1917 (aged 22); Near Riga, Estonia
- Cause of death: Plane crash
- Military career
- Allegiance: Russian Empire
- Branch: Imperial Russian Air Service (1915–1917)
- Service years: 1915–1917
- Rank: Podporuchik (Junior Officer, equivalent is Second Lieutenant)
- Unit: 12th Air detachment
- Known for: Being the first Estonian fighter ace
- Conflicts: First World War; Eastern Front †
- Awards: Cross of St. George (Russia)

Jaan Mahlapuu (Russian: Ян Махлапу) (11 November (or 9 November) 1894 in Valga – 2 August [O.S. 20 July] 1917 in Riga) was an Estonian fighter pilot for the Imperial Russian Air Service in World War I. He is known for being the first ace of Estonian origin who flew over Riga where he reputedly shot down five or six German airplanes.

In 1915, he was enrolled in the Pskov Flight School. After graduating in August 1916, he was transferred to the front of Riga with the 12th fighter air detachment of the Northern Front. He was assigned to a twin seater scout plane (the Nieuport 10), in which he took down a German escaping plane on 4 September. Between Early august and early September, Mahlapuu flew 18 combat sorties, rising to the rank of Senior Non-commissioned-officer and was awarded the Cross of St. George 4th class. By the end of October he was promoted to the rank of Feldfebel. The Nieuport 10 was not made for fighting and did not possess a synchronised machine gun, meaning the machine gun (adapted Colt or Maxim guns) had to be placed on the top of the wing. On New Year's Eve, long awaited Nieuport 11 aircraft arrived, equipped with a proper Lewis gun on the upper wing.

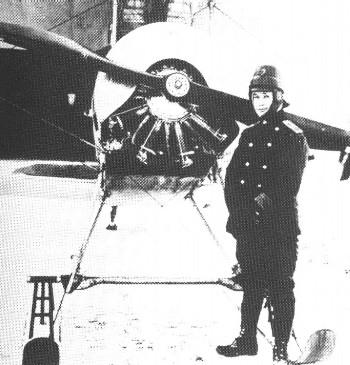
Mahlapuu with his Nieuport 11 (31 December 1916 or Early 1917)

His first confirmed victory was on 25 February 1917, although the details of this victory are scarce. Two weeks later Mahlapuu and his partner Zherebtsov flew a mission where they encountered a large German plane (likely a bomber). Mahlapuu noticed two enemy planes at the same height as him. He attacked the Albatross which broke into a corkscrew and crashed into the near to the village of Lida. He landed his aircraft to inspect the wreck, the pilot had serious injuries and died soon later, but the observer, an 18 year old Lieutenant was only lightly injured. There were three bombs in the aircraft which were not able to be dropped. He was congratulated by Grand Duke Alexander Mikhailovich and was given the next St George Cross (3rd Class). Mahlapuu was promoted to the first officer rank. During May and June, Mahlapuu made several successful interceptions, only Mahlapuu's constantly jammed machine gun let some Germans escape behind their own lines. By the end of July 1917, new Nieuport 21s, by this time Mahlapuu had flown 40 combat sorties, for a total 45 flight hours.

After he had participated in the victorious battles over Riga, he was named an honorary Citizen of Riga.

On 3 August 1917 at 8:35am, Jaan Mahlapuu died during an airplane accident where his plane turned into a uncontrollable corkscrew and crashed, killing Mahlapuu.
