= Ruhnu Lighthouse =

Lighthouse in Estonia

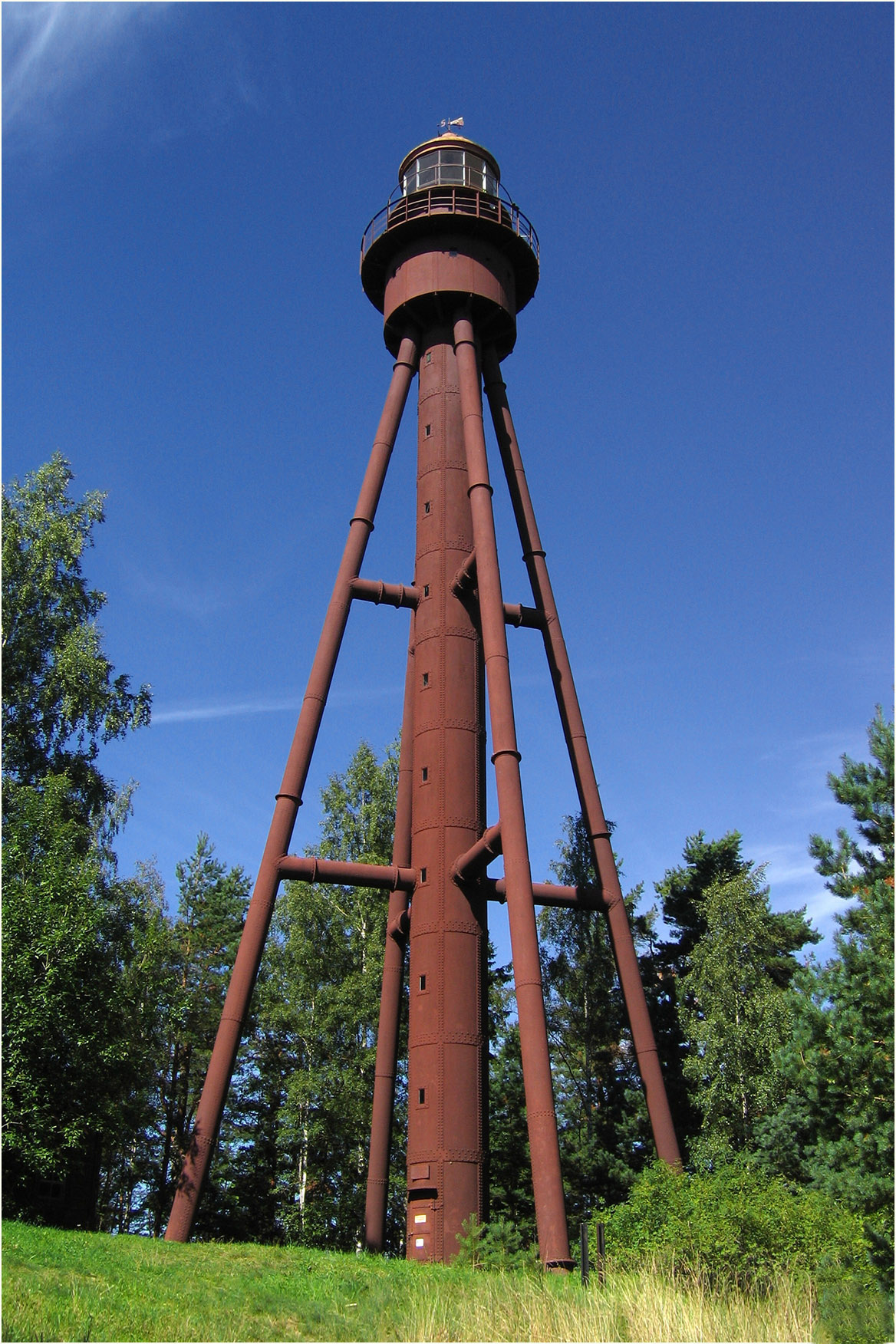
- Location: Ruhnu, Estonia
- Coordinates: 57.80135766°N 23.26012233°E

Tower
- Constructed: 1646 (first); 1757 (second); 1820 (third)
- Construction: cast iron
- Height: 30 metres (98 ft)
- Shape: square base skeletal tower with balcony, observation room and lantern
- Markings: brown tower and red lantern roof
- Heritage: architectural monument

Light
- First lit: 1877 (current)
- Focal height: 37 metres (121 ft)
- Range: 12 nautical miles (22 km; 14 mi)
- Characteristic: Fl W 4 s.
- Estonia no.: EVA 990

Ruhnu Lighthouse (Estonian: Ruhnu tuletorn) is a lighthouse located on the island of Ruhnu (in the Gulf of Riga), in Estonia.

== History ==
The first mention of a lighthouse on the island of Ruhnu is from the year of 1646. The current lighthouse was made in 1877, by Forges et Chantiers de la Méditerranée, a company based in France. According to rumours, the unusual design of the Ruhnu Lighthouse was made by Gustave Eiffel, however no actual proof has been given. The lighthouse's structure is made out of metal, supported by four counterforts. The lighthouse had a gallery and a sentry room, which was destroyed during World War I. The lighthouse was rebuilt in 1937.

== See also ==
- List of lighthouses in Estonia
