= Ruhnu =

Island in Estonia

Ruhnu Runö
- Flag Coat of arms

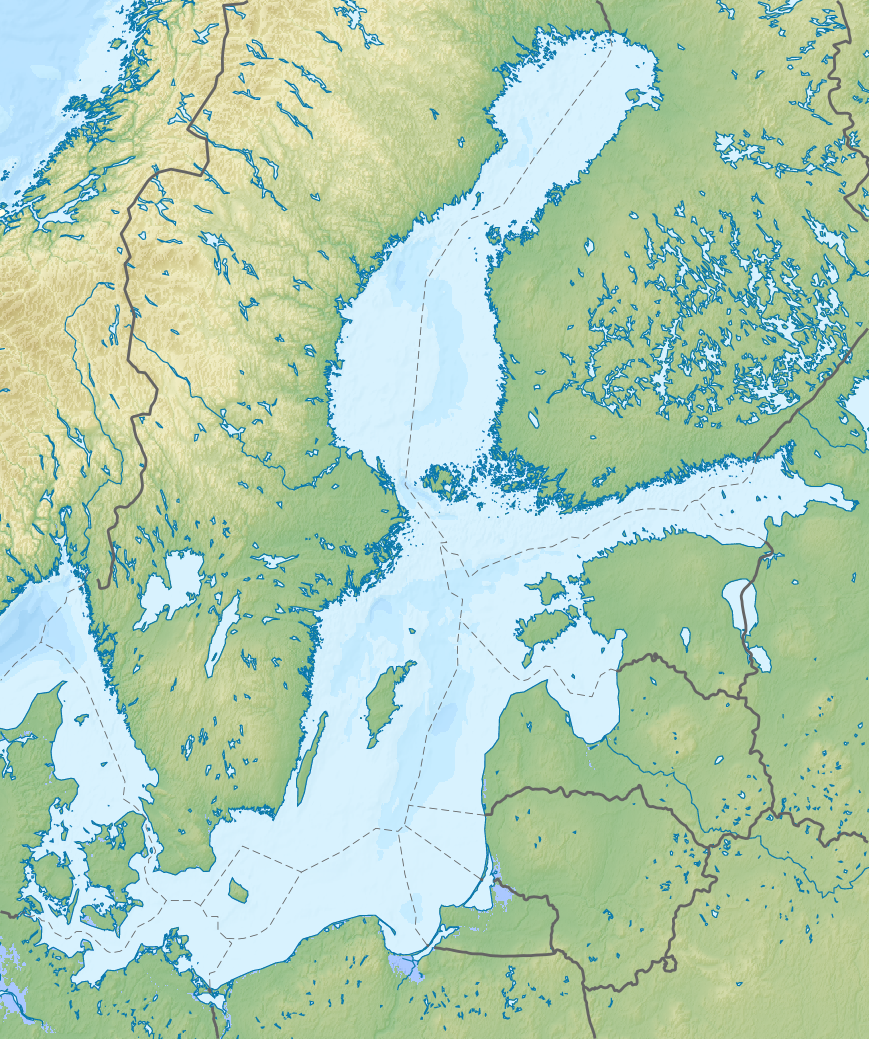
- Location in the Baltic Sea region Location in Estonia Location in Europe
- Coordinates: 57°48′N 23°15′E
- Country: Estonia
- County: Saare County
- Administrative centre: Ruhnu village

Area
  - Total: 11.9 km^{2} (4.6 sq mi)

Population (06.03.2023)
  - Total: 136
  - Density: 8.2/km^{2} (21/sq mi)
- Website: ruhnu.ee

Ruhnu (Swedish: Runö; Latvian: Roņu sala; Livonian: Rūnõmō) is an Estonian island in the Gulf of Riga in the Baltic Sea. Its territory of 11.9 square kilometres (4.6 sq mi) is administratively part of Saare maakond (county). Ruhnu lies geographically closer to the coast of Courland on the mainland of Latvia than it is to any point in the rest of Estonia. With fewer than 150 official residents, the Ruhnu vald (parish) has the smallest population of Estonia's 79 municipalities. Before 1944, it was for centuries populated by ethnic Swedes and traditional Swedish law was used.

== Important Bird Area ==
The island has been designated an Important Bird Area (IBA) by BirdLife International because it supports significant numbers of long-tailed ducks and velvet scoters, both wintering and on passage.

== Climate ==
The Estonian Environmental Agency owns a meteorological station in Ruhnu. Ruhnu has an oceanic climate (Cfb). Precipitation amounts are quite moderate for an oceanic type of climate.

Climate data for Ruhnu 2015-2024
Month	Jan	Feb	Mar	Apr	May	Jun	Jul	Aug	Sep	Oct	Nov	Dec	Year
Mean daily maximum °C (°F)	4.2 (39.6)	3.2 (37.8)	4.4 (39.9)	9.2 (48.6)	16.2 (61.2)	21.4 (70.5)	22.3 (72.1)	21.5 (70.7)	18.3 (64.9)	13.9 (57.0)	9.9 (49.8)	6.0 (42.8)	12.5 (54.6)
Daily mean °C (°F)	−0.2 (31.6)	0.0 (32.0)	1.3 (34.3)	5.0 (41.0)	10.8 (51.4)	16.2 (61.2)	18.4 (65.1)	18.4 (65.1)	14.8 (58.6)	9.4 (48.9)	5.3 (41.5)	2.2 (36.0)	8.5 (47.2)
Mean daily minimum °C (°F)	−6.6 (20.1)	−5.0 (23.0)	−2.8 (27.0)	1.0 (33.8)	5.3 (41.5)	11.0 (51.8)	14.8 (58.6)	14.9 (58.8)	10.5 (50.9)	4.8 (40.6)	−0.7 (30.7)	−2.0 (28.4)	3.8 (38.8)
Average precipitation mm (inches)	42.3 (1.67)	31.3 (1.23)	27.6 (1.09)	29.5 (1.16)	31.3 (1.23)	50.5 (1.99)	56.9 (2.24)	75.3 (2.96)	58.4 (2.30)	63.5 (2.50)	60.4 (2.38)	41.8 (1.65)	568.8 (22.4)
Source: Meteorological yearbooks of Estonia for the period 2015 -2024. Estonian Environment Agency.

== History ==
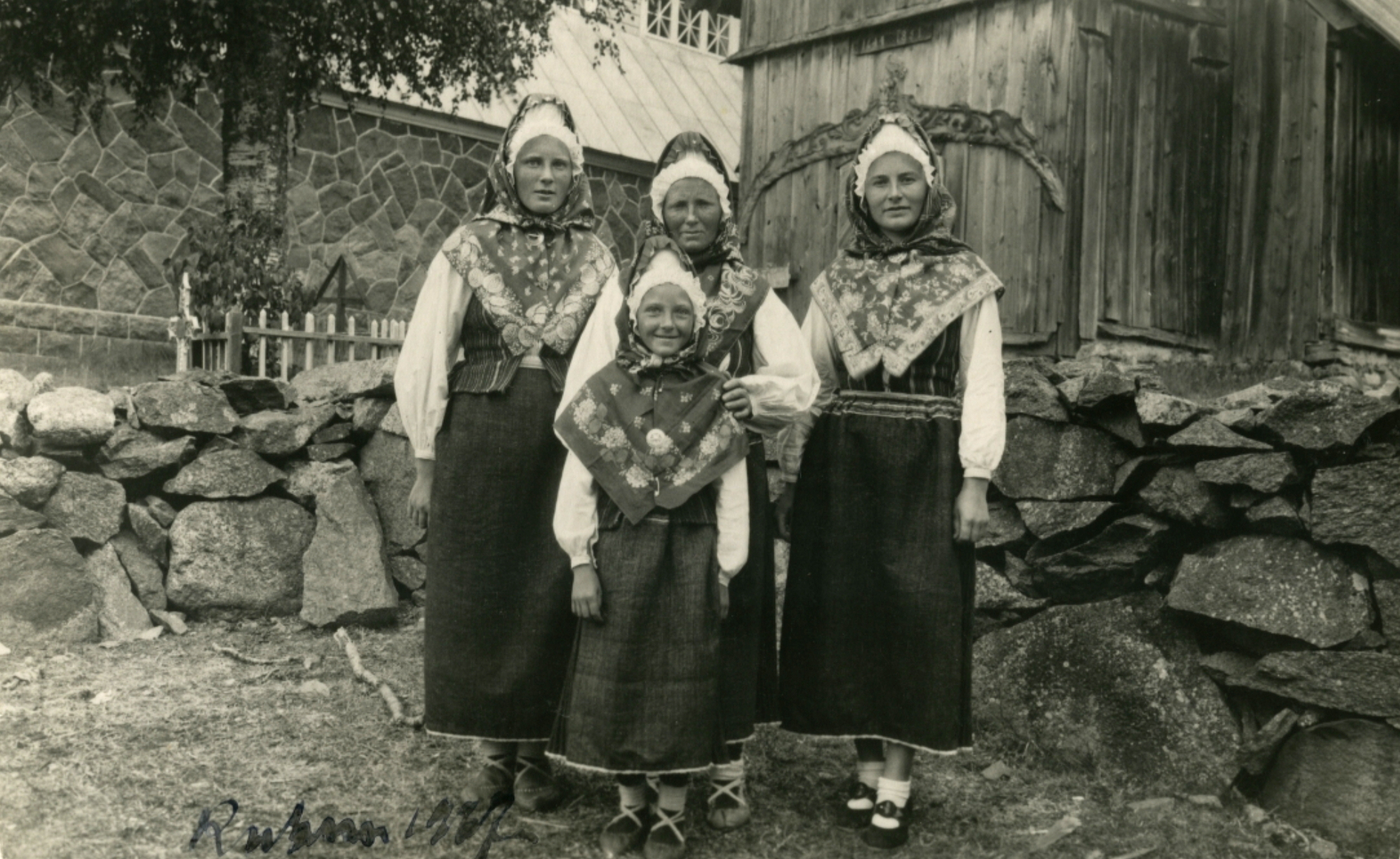
Women in folk costume (1937)

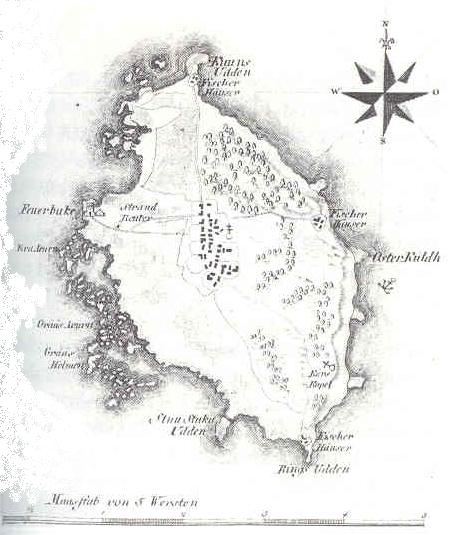
Map of Ruhnu by Ludwig August von Mellin, Atlas of Livonia (1798)

The first archaeological artifacts of human activity in Ruhnu, assumed to be related to seasonal seal hunting, date back to around 5000 BC. The time of arrival of the first ancient Scandinavians in Ruhnu and the beginning of a permanent Swedish-speaking settlement is not known. It probably did not precede the Northern Crusades at the beginning of the 13th century, when the indigenous peoples of all the lands surrounding the Gulf of Riga were converted to Christianity and subjugated to the Teutonic Order. The first documented record of the island of Ruhnu, and of its Swedish population, is a 1341 letter sent by the Bishop of Courland which confirmed the islanders' right to reside and manage their property in accordance with Swedish law.

Ruhnu was controlled by the Kingdom of Sweden (1621–1708, formally until 1721) and after that by the Russian Empire until World War I, when it was occupied by Imperial German armed forces (1915–1918).

Under the tsarist Russian rule in the 18th–19th century the island had de facto independence in most affairs, though designated as crown land. The island's Lutheran clergyman served as gutsverwalter (estate custodian) in matters of state. In the middle of the 19th century, a majority of the islanders sought to leave Lutheranism and join the Russian Orthodox Church, and formal steps in this direction took place in 1866 with papers exchanged with the Orthodox dean of Saaremaa in anticipation of Orthodox chrismation. But the planned conversion did not proceed.

After World War I, despite some local initiatives to rejoin Sweden, and territorial claims by Latvia, the islanders agreed to become part of newly independent Estonia in 1919 (possibly due to the existence of a Swedish minority in Estonia). According to a census taken in 1934, Ruhnu had a population of 282: 277 ethnic Swedes and 5 ethnic Estonians.

During World War II, Ruhnu, along with the rest of Estonia, was first occupied by Soviet Union (1940–1941) and then Nazi Germany (1941–1944). In November 1943, the first group of about 75 islanders relocated to Sweden. In August 1944, shortly before the Red Army of the Soviet Union reoccupied Estonia, the remaining population of the island, except for two families, fled by ship to Sweden. The islanders in Sweden established an association, Runöbornas förening, to preserve the history and culture of Ruhnu's original population.

During the period of Soviet occupation after 1944, the island was repopulated by Estonian civilians and also hosted a unit of the Soviet Air Defence Forces. The property of the former islanders was declared property of the state and a collective farm was established. In 1965 the first Ruhnu-Kihnu Games were held, this cultural and sports festival attracting attention throughout Estonia. Following a severe storm in 1969 and the closure of the local fishery collective in 1970, the population declined from 222 to only 58.

== Life on Ruhnu today ==
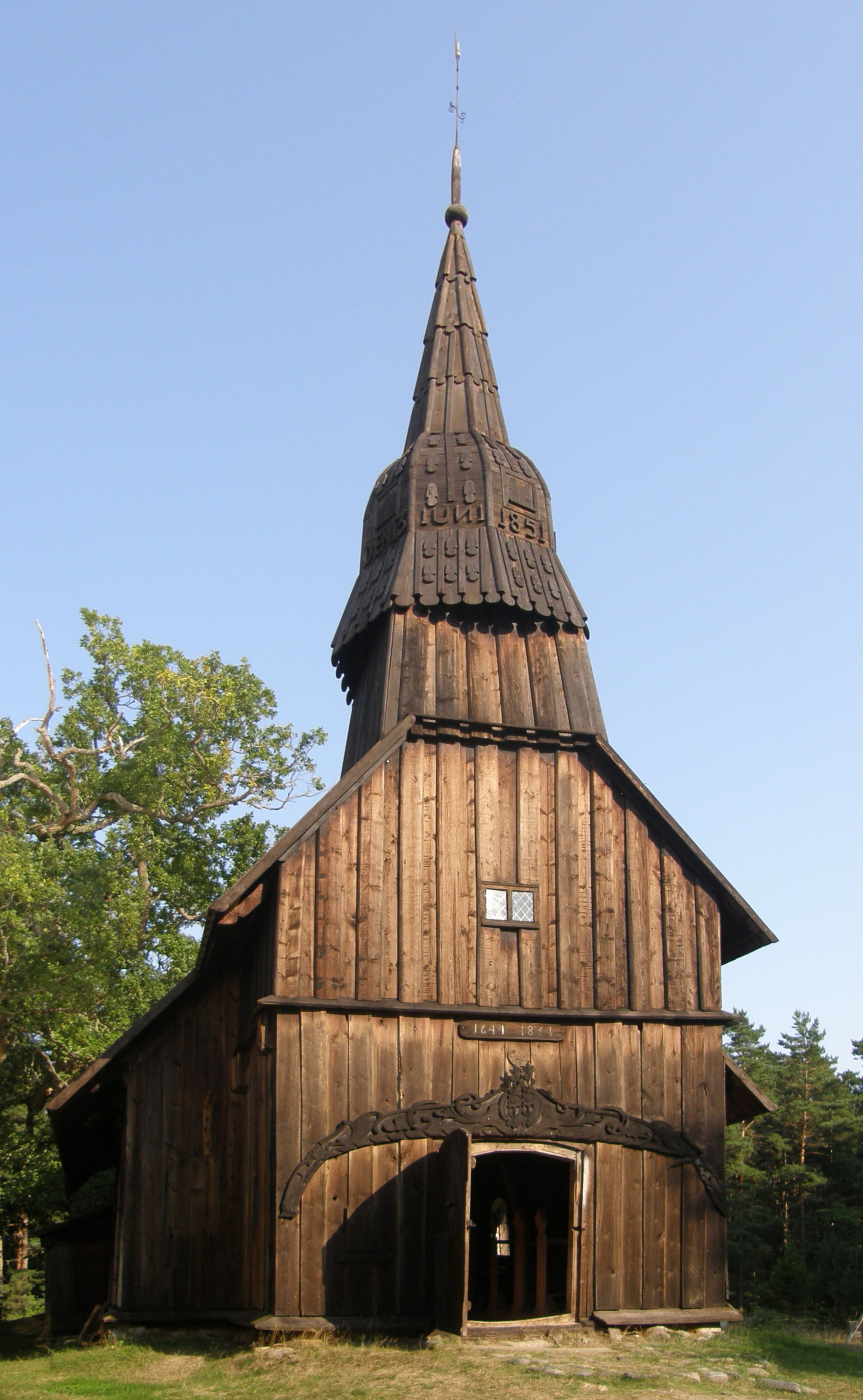
Ruhnu wooden church

After Estonia regained independence in 1991, buildings, land, and other property on Ruhnu Island were returned to those with ownership claims that went back to before to the Soviet occupation of Estonia, or to their descendants. In case of Ruhnu, those descendants were mostly resident in Sweden. Most of them did not return to Ruhnu, but they still occasionally visit the land of their ancestors.

Ruhnu is served by the Ruhnu Airfield which has scheduled flights from Pärnu and Kuressaare from October to April. Passenger ferries operate from May to October from Pärnu, Roomassaare, Munalaid and Roja.

The island has a quadripod tower lighthouse, which stands on the highest point of the island, Haubjerre hill. It was prefabricated in France and shipped to Ruhnu for assembly in 1877. The structure is believed to have been designed by Gustave Eiffel.

The Ruhnu wooden church, built in 1644, is one of the oldest wood constructed buildings in Estonia. The church's baroque-style tower was finished in 1755. The stone Lutheran church next to the wooden one was built in 1912 and is currently where services are held.

Limo beach is one of the island's most popular and accessible beaches for tourists.

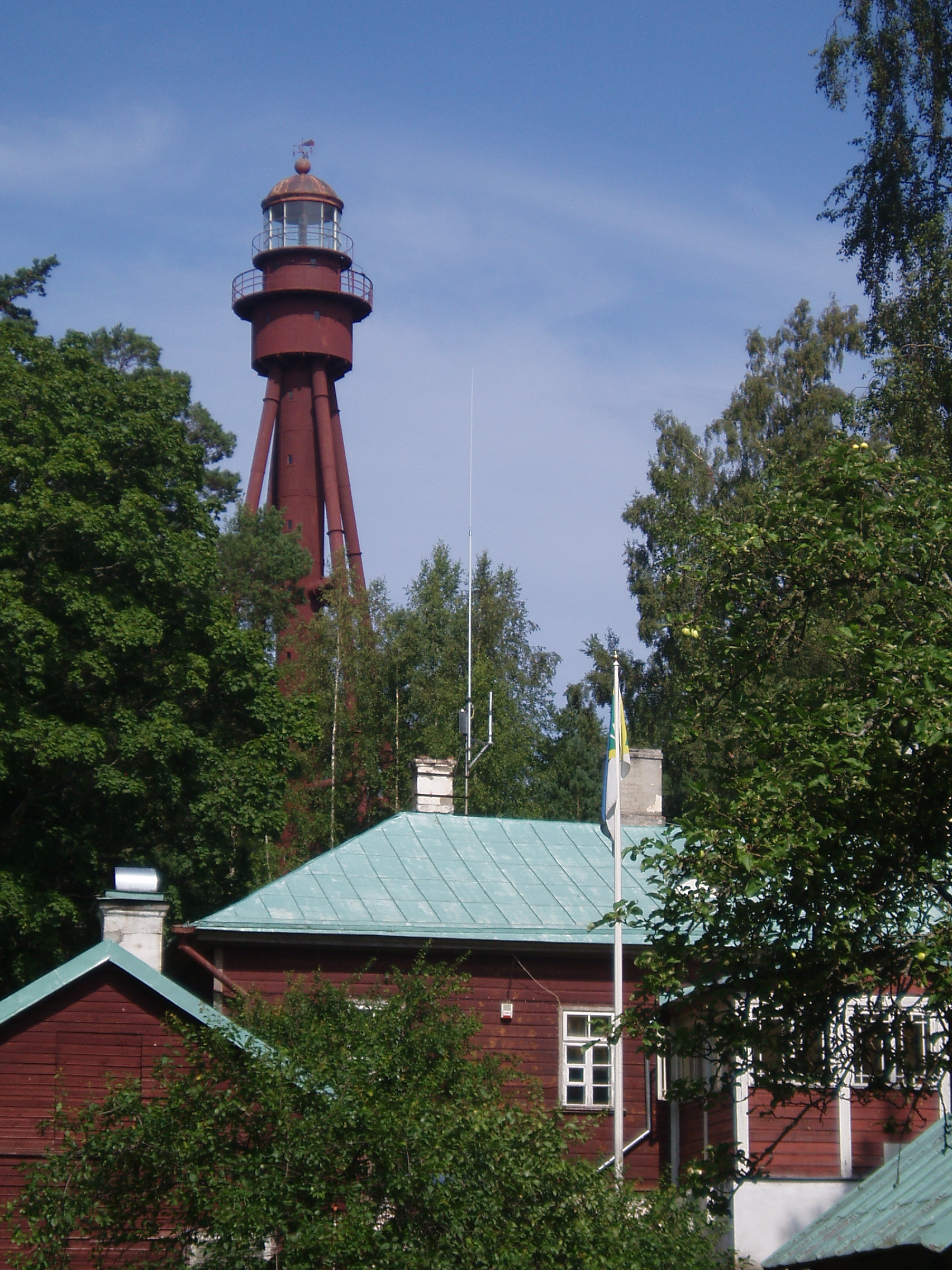
Ruhnu lighthouse

Geologically the island is the higher part of a submarine drumlin-like ridge.

Ruhnu is home to a rare native breed of sheep called the Estonian Ruhnu (Estonian: eesti maalammas). The breed numbers approximately 33 individuals and are used primarily for wool. A herd of fifty Highland cattle were introduced to Ruhnu in 2013, in an attempt to restore the semi-natural coastal meadows in the southwestern part of the island.

In the spring of 2006, a 150-kilogram (330 lb) brown bear arrived on Ruhnu via an ice floe across the Gulf of Riga from the mainland of Latvia, some 40 km (25 mi) away. The bear's journey and resettlement on the island became a highly publicized media sensation in both the Estonian and Latvian press, as Ruhnu has been devoid of any large carnivores for many centuries. The bear continued to evade capture for months and environment ministry officials reported that tourists hoping to catch a glimpse of the elusive bear outnumbered permanent residents. The bear is believed by authorities to have since returned to Latvia.

== See also ==
- Ruhnu Parish
- Runö question
- Ruhnu Lighthouse
- Estonian Swedes
- Aiboland
- List of islands of Estonia
- Estonian Ruhnu sheep
