= Walk crisis =

1918-1920 border dispute between Estonia and Latvia

Walk Crisis
- Part of Estonian War of Independence and Latvian War of Independence
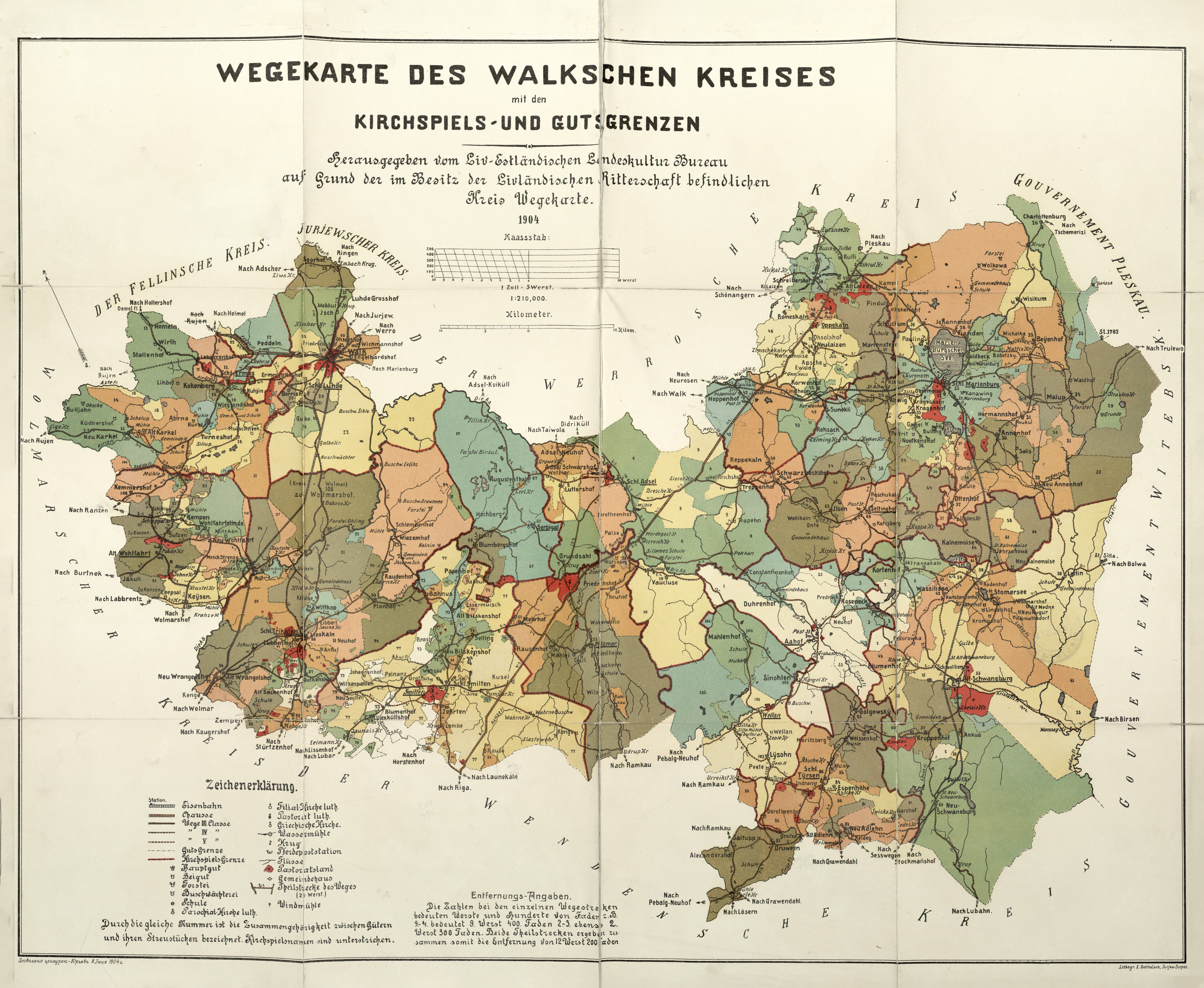
- Map of Walk County, 1904
Date	1918 – 1920
Location	Walk (now Valga, Estonia and Valka, Latvia), Runö (now Ruhnu)
Result	Inconclusive
Territorial changes	Estonians take Ruhnu, Walk divided between the two countries following third-party arbitration by Colonel Stephen George Tallents

Belligerents
Estonia	Latvia

Commanders and leaders
(Estonia) Jaan Tõnisson (Estonia) Otto August Strandman (Estonia) Konstantin Päts (Estonia) Johan Laidoner (Estonia) Nikolai Reek (Estonia) Julius Jürgenson	(Latvia) Kārlis Ulmanis (Latvia) Jānis Balodis (Latvia) Aleksandrs Plensners

The Walk Crisis (also called the Valga Crisis or the Valka Crisis, after the Estonian and Latvian names of the town, respectively) was an episode in Estonia–Latvia relations over the territorial dispute along the border between the two countries, chiefly about the town of Walk (now Valga, Estonia and Valka, Latvia) and the island of Runö (now Ruhnu, Estonia). The territorial dispute lasted from 1918 when both countries declared independence, until its settlement in a border treaty in October 1920.

== Background ==
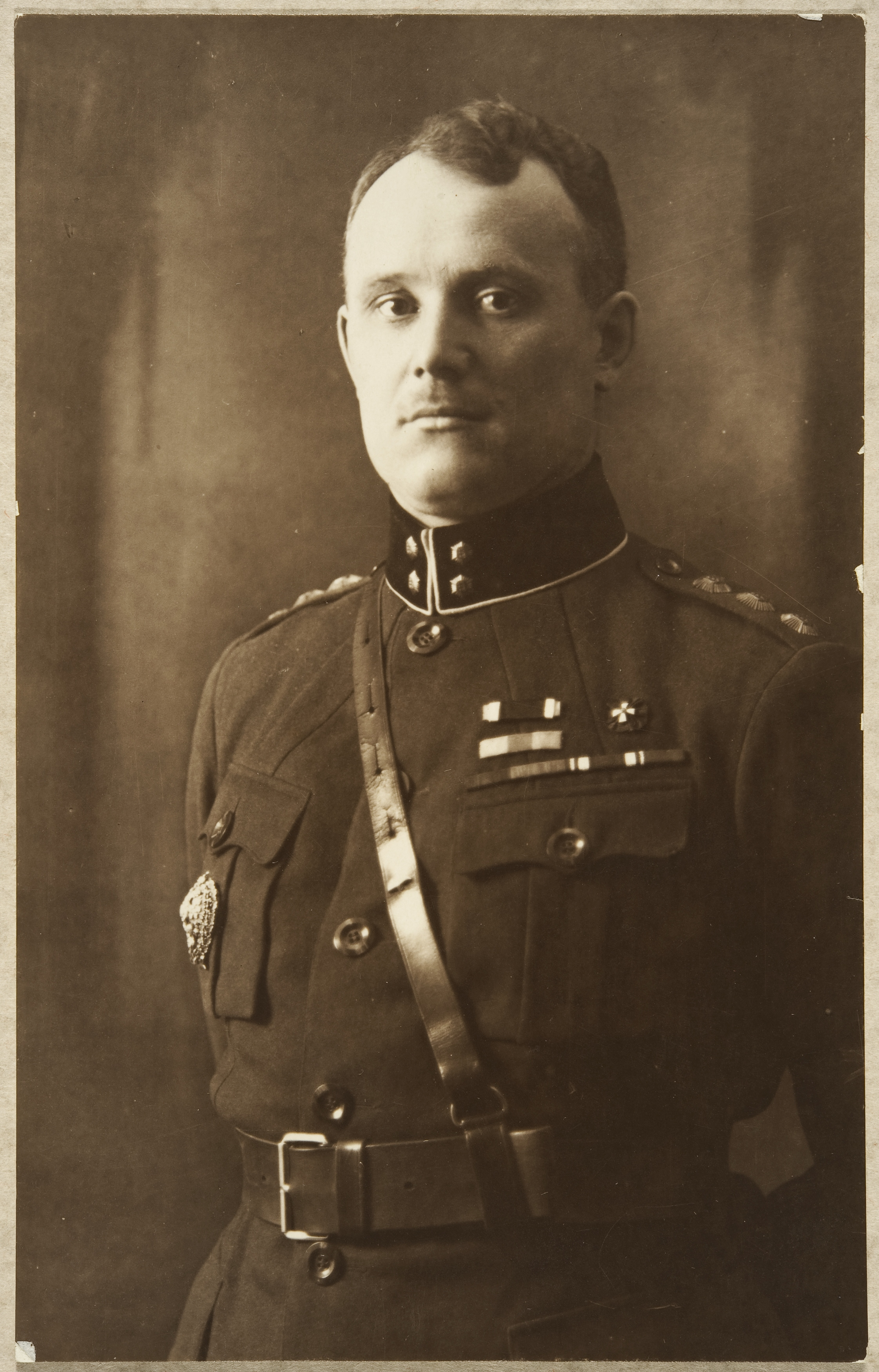
Johan Laidoner, the Commander‑in‑Chief of the Estonian Armed Forces.

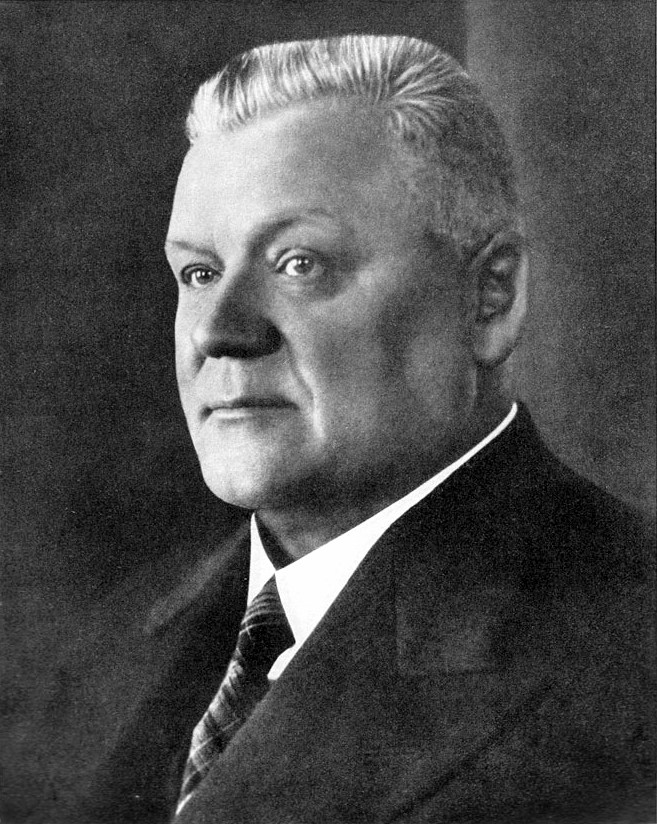
Kārlis Ulmanis, the first Prime Minister of Latvia.

When the Soviet Russian Red Army captured the Latvian capital Riga in January 1919 during the Latvian War of Independence, the Latvian Provisional Government fled to Liepāja. Entente Powers were asked to help save the situation. The Prime Minister of Latvia, Kārlis Ulmanis, also sent a request for assistance to the Estonian Provisional Government. On 18 February 1919, an agreement on relations and joint military activities between Estonia and Latvia was signed, which gave control over the city of Walk and seven rural municipalities with mixed Estonian and Latvian population to Estonia until the international border was determined.

By the summer of 1919, entire northern Latvia was liberated by joint Estonian-Latvian force. In October 1919 the situation became critical for the Latvian government once again. On 8 October, a German-Russian force based in Courland and led by General Pavel Bermondt-Avalov, launched an offensive to overthrow the Latvian government in Riga. Latvia asked for, and received military help from, Lithuania and Estonia. Armored trains and troops sent from Estonia helped Latvia to repel Bermondt-Avalov's advance. At the time, the governments of Estonia and Latvia started negotiations, and a new military agreement was signed on 10 October 1919. The February agreement had previously been cancelled by Latvia as they saw it as an unauthorized agreement. During the negotiations, the question of Walk came up again. The Latvians did not agree with the Estonian proposal, in response to which General Laidoner of the Estonian Army ordered the armored trains to be brought out of Riga.

Walk had historically almost always been dominated by ethnic Estonians, although ethnic Latvians constituted a plurality of registered voters.

== Escalation ==
By the end of 1919, the Latvian Ministry of Foreign Affairs said that their great concessions would not find any return on the part of Estonia. Estonia in turn saw the negotiations as going nowhere. On 24 December 1919, General Laidoner of ordered Latvians to end the work of their civilian institutions in Walk and elsewhere in the Estonian-occupied territories. Those who did not comply were to be sent across the border. Latvian authorities rejected these demands. In January 1920, the military commanders of both countries met, but no agreement was reached. The following meetings between the Estonian and Latvian delegations did not bring a breakthrough either as the Estonian delegation was not interested in dividing up Walk. At the end of February, the Latvian delegation made the last attempt to compromise. They proposed that Walk was to become a free city – the offer was rejected by the Estonians.

On the evening of 10 March 1920, a secret meeting of the Latvian government took place. According to a representative of the Estonian army in Riga, the meeting had featured discussion of war with Estonia, for which Kārlis Ulmanis was to be ousted from the position of Minister of War and replaced by General Balodis who would have been more supportive of a war. Already on 20 August 1919, the Latvian organizations of Walk sent a complaint to the Latvian Foreign Minister Zigfrīds Meierovics, about what they described as mistreatment of Latvians by the Estonian authorities. In December, a new complaint was sent to Prime Minister Kārlis Ulmanis. This time the Estonians were blamed for cutting down forests belonging to Latvians, and alleged calls for aggression against Latvians by an Estonian-language newspaper published in Walk, amongst many other accusations.

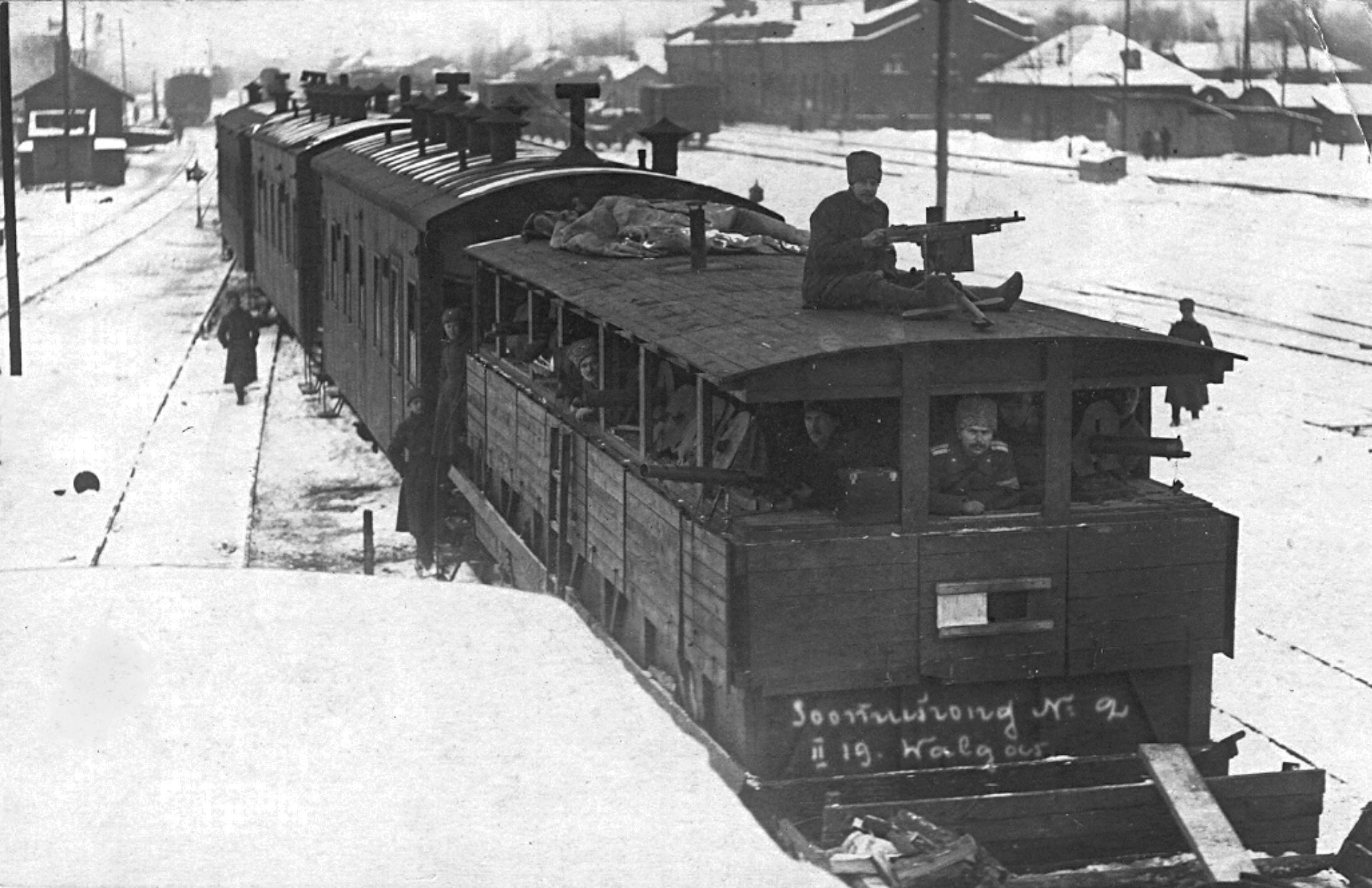
An Estonian improvised armoured train in Walk in 1919, during the Estonian War of Independence.

As tensions rose, General Laidoner sent several Estonian units and armored trains to the Latvian border. Some Latvian forces had also advanced nearer to the border. On 18 March, General Balodis made a statement that as long as he was commander-in-chief, the Latvian army would not start any military action against Estonia. Over the next few days, it was agreed that the border dispute over Walk would be settled by a court of arbitration chaired by British Colonel Stephen George Tallents. By the end of June 1920, it became clear to Tallents that he would not be able to make a mutually satisfactory decision, and he set the boundary at his own discretion by 1 July. Estonian received most of the city of Walk, and lost the small town of Heinaste (Ainaži) even though its population was mostly Estonian, and a few other smaller areas. Despite popular discontent about the new "Tallents' borders" in both Estonia and Latvia, they were accepted by both governments. It took another three years before a complementary border agreement was concluded.

== Runö question ==
The island of Ruhnu (Runö) in the Gulf of Riga was since 1919 controlled by Estonia, however claimed by Latvia as well. "Latvia is ready to give the island of Ruhnu no less freedoms than Estonia, if not more. This would be a good measure against the intrigues of Estonians and would greatly win our sympathy for Sweden," the Latvian Embassy in Stockholm messaged the Latvian Foreign Ministry in Riga in August 1920. The response of Estonian diplomats to these aspirations of the Latvian government was a categorical no – there were to be no discussions whatsoever about changing the borders around Ruhnu. At the beginning of January 1922, Estonian Foreign Minister Ants Piip also spoke with the Swedish Ambassador to Estonia about Runö. The latter expressed the wish that "the island of Ruhnu would not be handed over to Latvia, against which the Swedish government can also protest in the affirmative".

Ruhnu (Runö) has remained part of Estonia since 1919, when the Estonian authorities succeeded in taking control of the island by peaceful means, and before Latvia was able to do so. In January 1919, the Estonian Provisional Government declared the island of Ruhnu part of Estonia. However, rumors soon reached Tallinn that the Latvian Government had done the same. The population of Runö themselves, which consisted of 277 ethnic Swedes and 5 ethnic Estonians, and had lived under Swedish law for centuries, was more interested in becoming part of Sweden instead. In May 1919, it was decided in the Estonian capital to send a trade delegation to provide "monetary incentives" to the people of Runö — the delegation were sent with 15,000 marks from the Estonian government in order to buy seal fat from the people of Runö. Cartridges, rifles, leather, kerosene and foodstuffs were also sent to the island.

On 3 June 1919, the official Estonian delegation reached Runö. Nikolai Blees, head of the Ministry of the Interior's Minorities Committee, won the trust of the locals because he communicated with the islanders in Swedish. With that, Blees had played an important role in the fact that the people of Runö had agreed to remain part of the newly independent Republic of Estonia. The transaction by which the delegation bought 644 trees and 25 pounds of seal fat from the people of Runö for 13,140 marks also benefited. The fat was paid for in cash and barter (including 100 liters of alcohol and 150 bottles of wine). The very next day, the Estonian flag was hoisted on the island. However, the government could not do anything with the seal fat, and eventually it spoiled.

Ever since the end of the Walk crisis, the two neighbouring countries, Estonia and Latvia, have sustained good bilateral relations, despite some minor disagreements over less important issues.
