= Dala Pälsfår =

Breed of sheep

The Dala-fur (Dala pälsfår, Swedish) is a breed of domestic sheep originating in Sweden. The Dala-fur is one of several sheep breeds that are remnants of the old Swedish landrace breed, and is one of the Northern European short-tailed sheep breeds.

== Characteristics ==
This breed is white, small, short, hardy and has a short, wool-less tail. About 90% of all rams are horned while the ewes are polled (hornless). Rams weigh approximately 60 kilograms (130 lb) and ewes 45 kilograms (99 lb).

In 2000, there were 160 Dala-fur sheep. In 2002, the population decreased to 95 and 2006 there were 116.
