= List of international prime ministerial trips made by Mark Rutte =

This is a list of international prime ministerial trips made by Mark Rutte, the former prime minister of the Netherlands.

== Summary of international trips ==
As of October 2026, Mark Rutte has made more than 353 prime ministerial trips to more than 81 states internationally since his inauguration on 14 October 2010. National trips are not included.

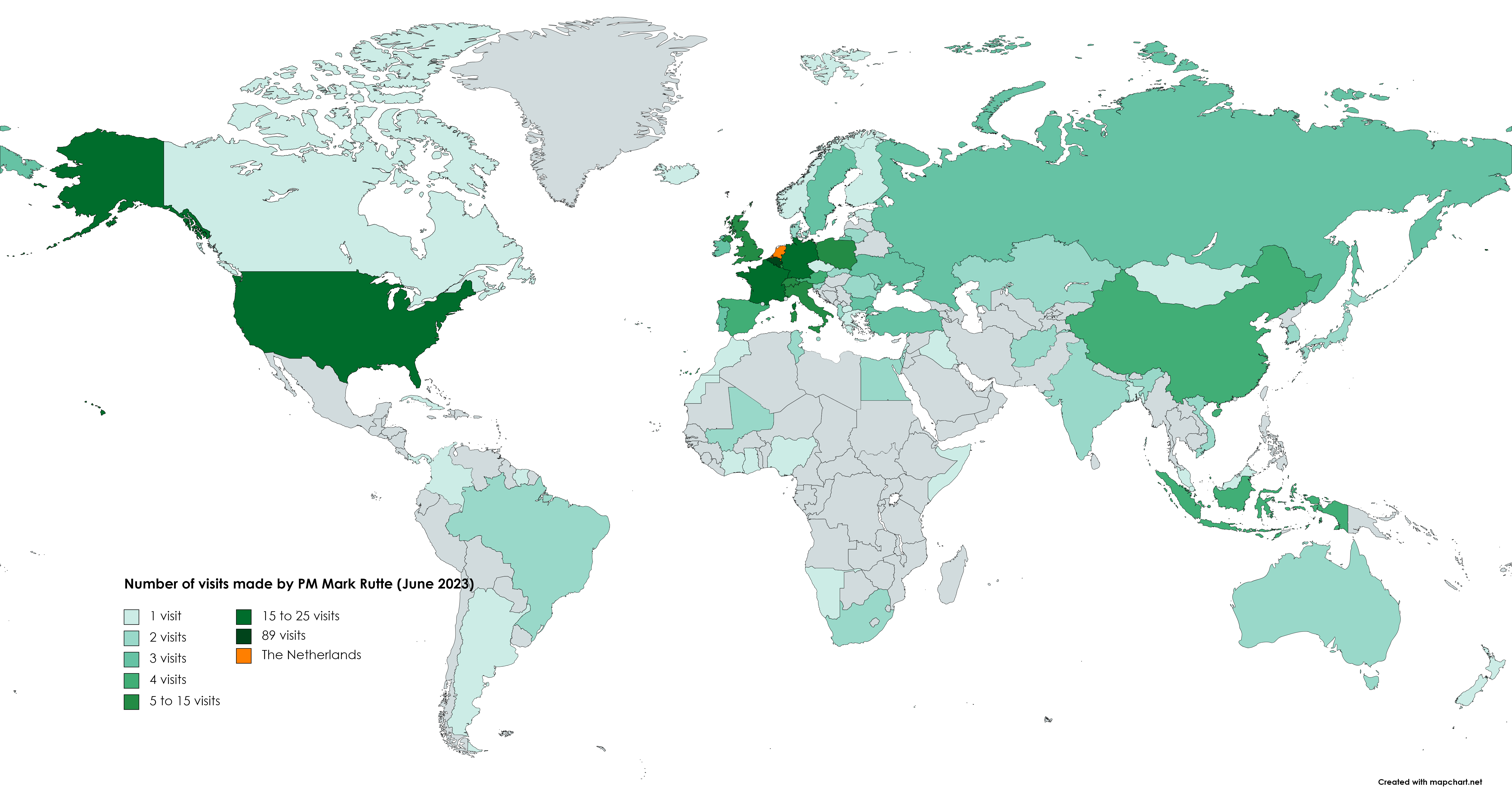
World map highlighting countries visited by Mark Rutte during his term as prime minister, as of 22 June 2023.

Prime Minister Mark Rutte's visits by country
| Number of visits | Country or Dutch overseas territory |
|---|---|
| 1 visit (33) | Argentina, Bangladesh, Bonaire (Netherlands), Bosnia and Herzegovina, Canada, Colombia, Croatia, Cuba, Czech Republic, Estonia, Finland, Ghana, Greece, Kosovo, Iraq, Ivory Coast, Lebanon, Mongolia, Morocco, Namibia, New Zealand, Nigeria, North Macedonia, Norway, Panama, Qatar, Saba (Netherlands), Saudi Arabia, Serbia, Singapore, Sint Eustatius (Netherlands), Somalia, Suriname |
| 2 visits (19) | Afghanistan, Aruba (Netherlands), Australia, Brazil, Curaçao (Netherlands), Denmark, Japan, Kazakhstan, Malaysia, Mali, Malta, Moldova, Romania, Sint Maarten (Netherlands), Slovakia, Slovenia, South Africa, South Korea, United Arab Emirates |
| 3 visits (12) | Albania, Bulgaria, Egypt, India, Ireland, Portugal, Russia, Sweden, Tunisia, Turkey, Vatican City, Vietnam |
| 4 visits (4) | Austria, Indonesia, Lithuania, Palestine, Spain |
| 5 visits (2) | China, Ukraine |
| 6 visits (1) | Luxembourg |
| 7 visits (1) | Israel |
| 8 visits (1) | Italy |
| 10 visits (1) | Poland |
| 12 visits (1) | United Kingdom |
| 14 visits (1) | Switzerland |
| 20 visits (1) | United States |
| 21 visits (1) | France |
| 27 visits (1) | Germany |
| 97 visits (1) | Belgium |

== 2010 ==
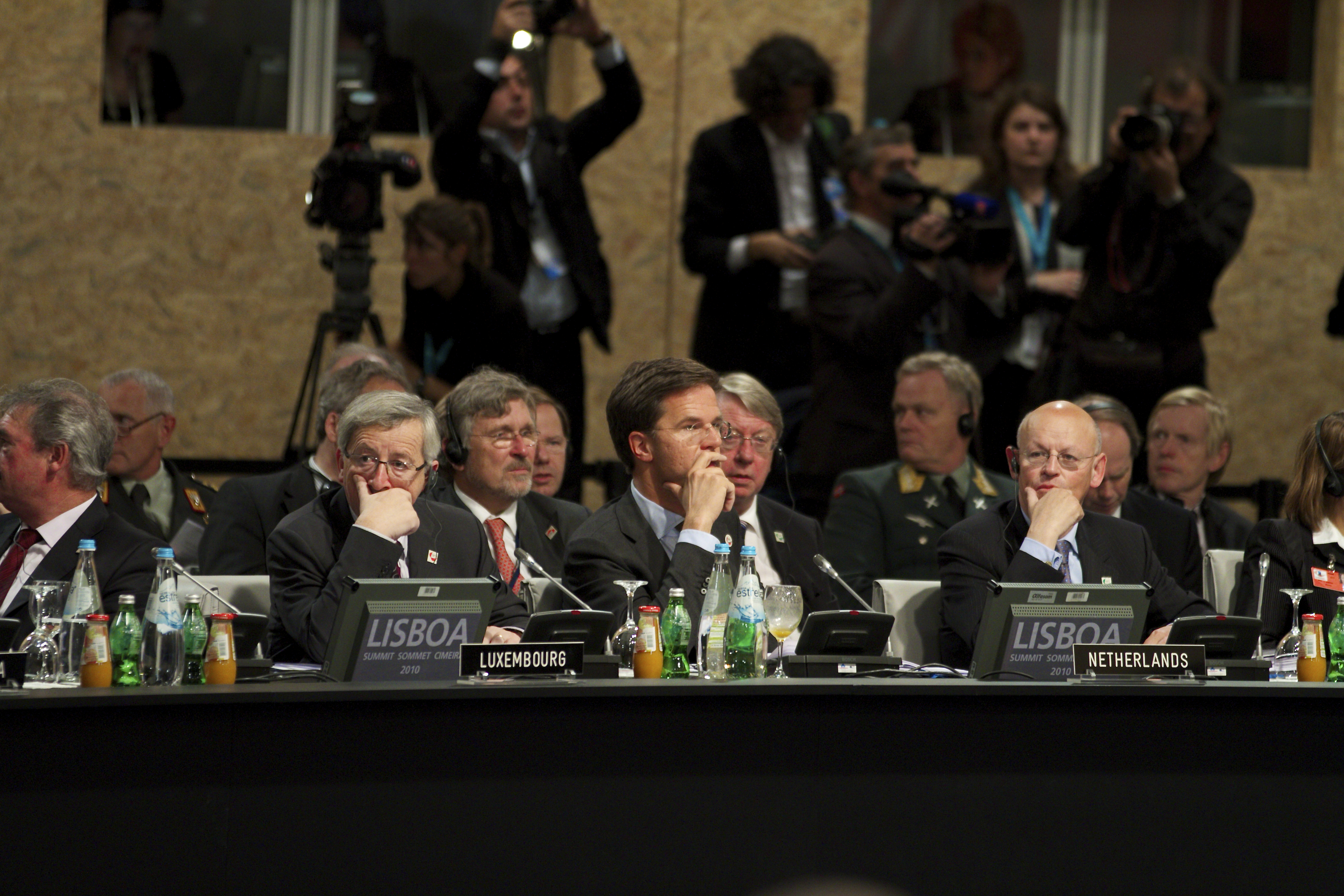
Rutte at the 2010 Lisbon summit.

| Country | Areas visited | Date(s) | Details |
|---|---|---|---|
| Belgium | Brussels | 28-29 October | Rutte attended the European Council meeting. |
| Germany | Berlin | 19 November | Rutte met with Chancellor Angela Merkel. |
| Portugal | Lisbon | 19-20 November | Rutte attended the NATO 2010 Lisbon summit. |
| France | Paris | 29 November | Rutte met with President Nicolas Sarkozy. |
| Kazakhstan | Astana | 30 November-1 December | Rutte attended the Organization for Security and Co-operation in Europe Summit. |
| Switzerland | Zürich | 2 December | Rutte attended the FIFA World Cup host announcement. |
| Belgium | Brussels | 15-17 December | Rutte attended the European Council meeting. |

== 2011 ==
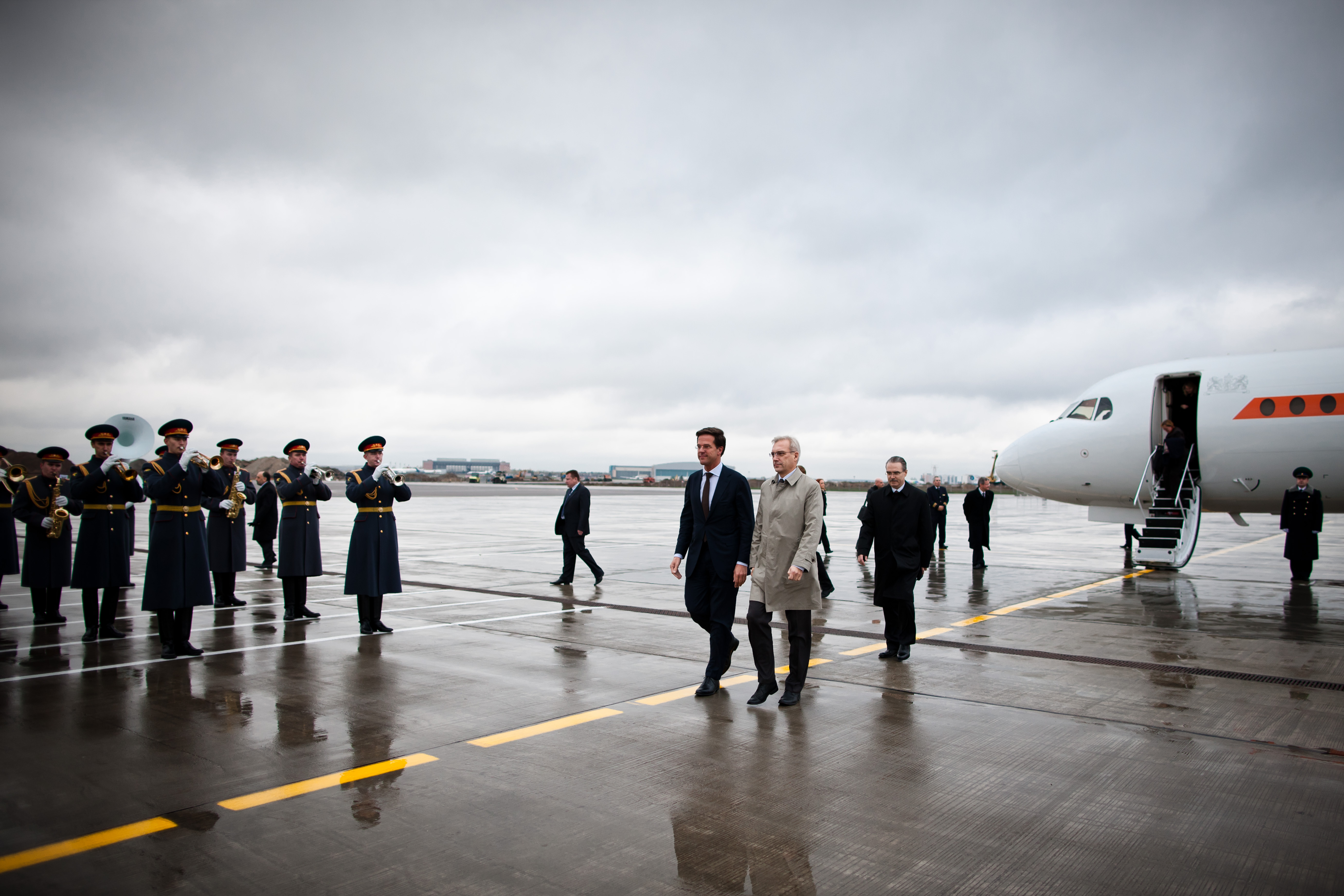
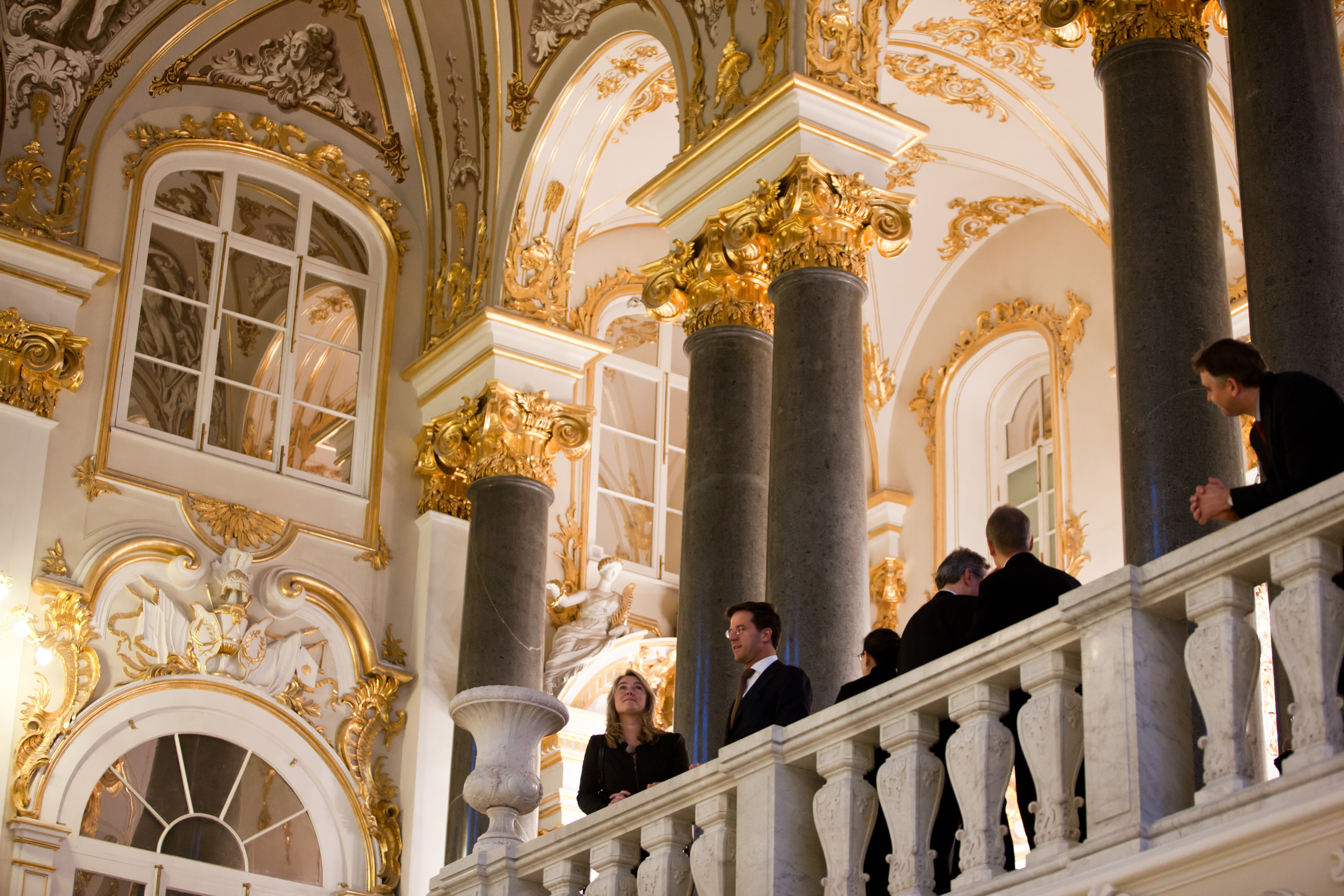
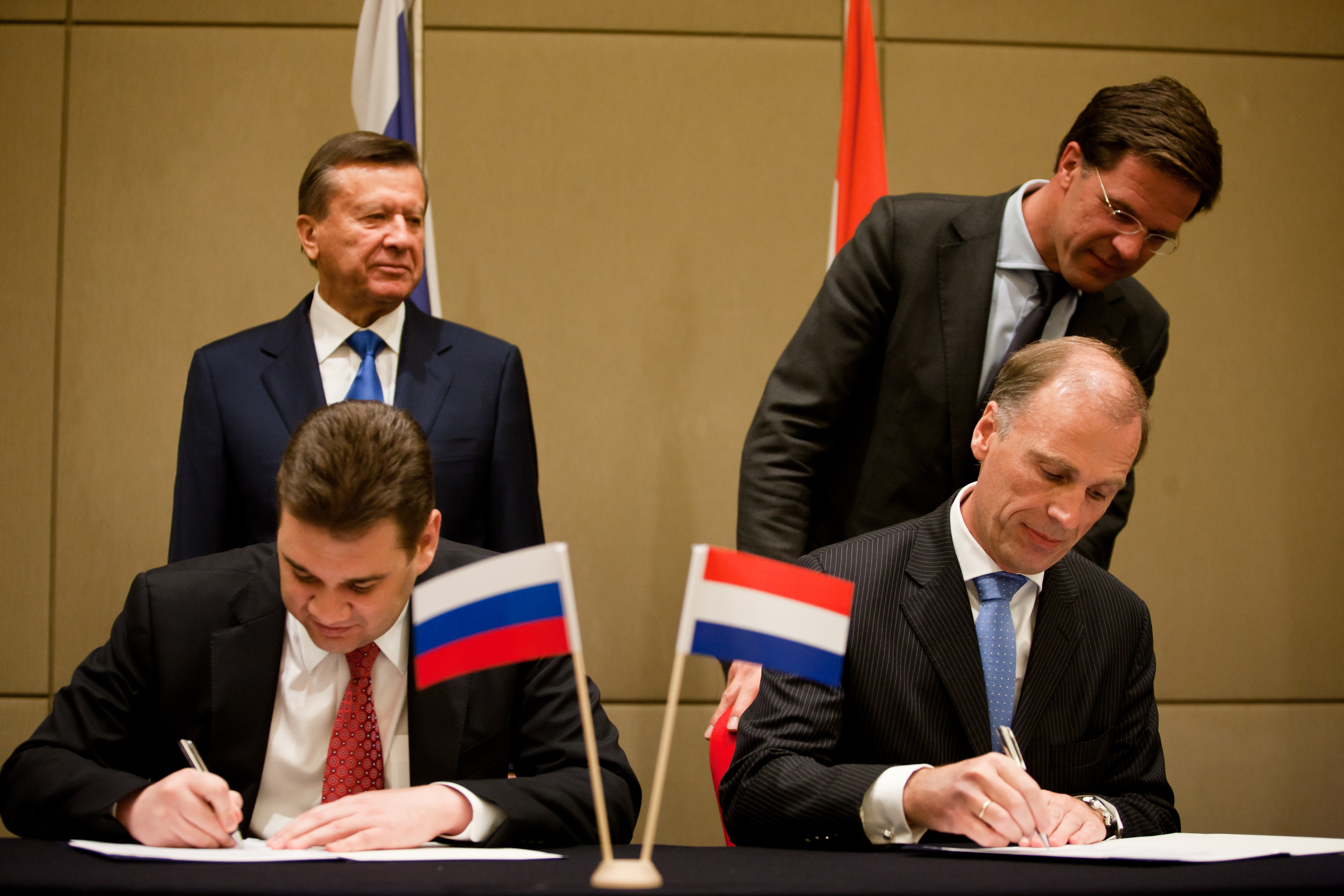
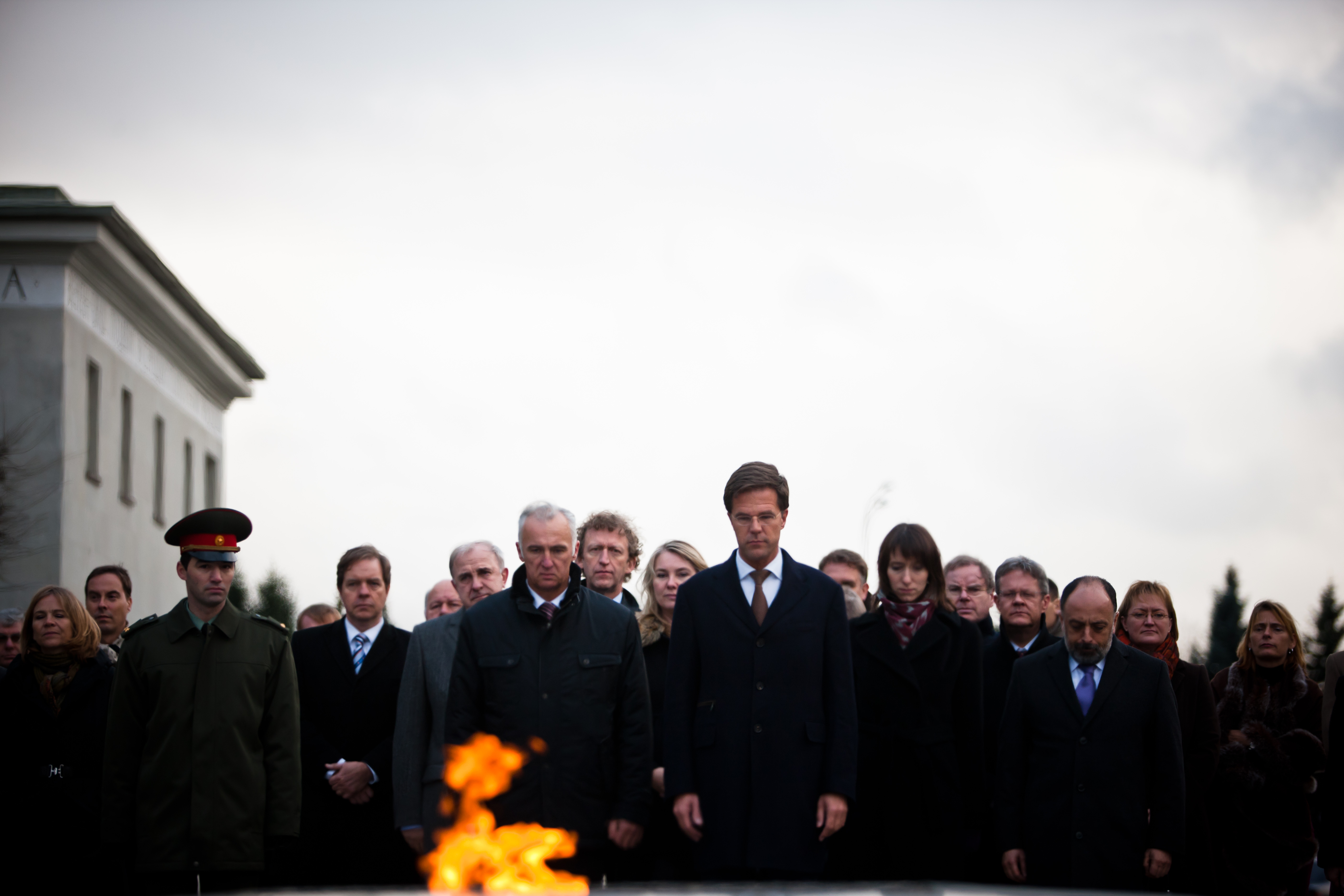
Mark Rutte visiting Russia on a trade mission to tighten economic relations. (October 2011)
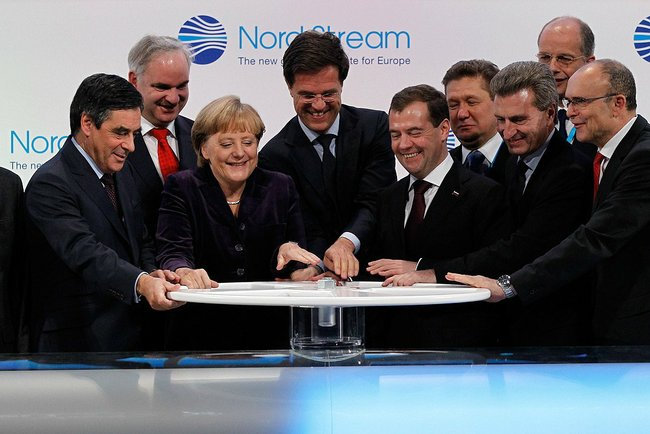
Mark Rutte and other government officials opening the Nord Stream pipeline. (November 2011)
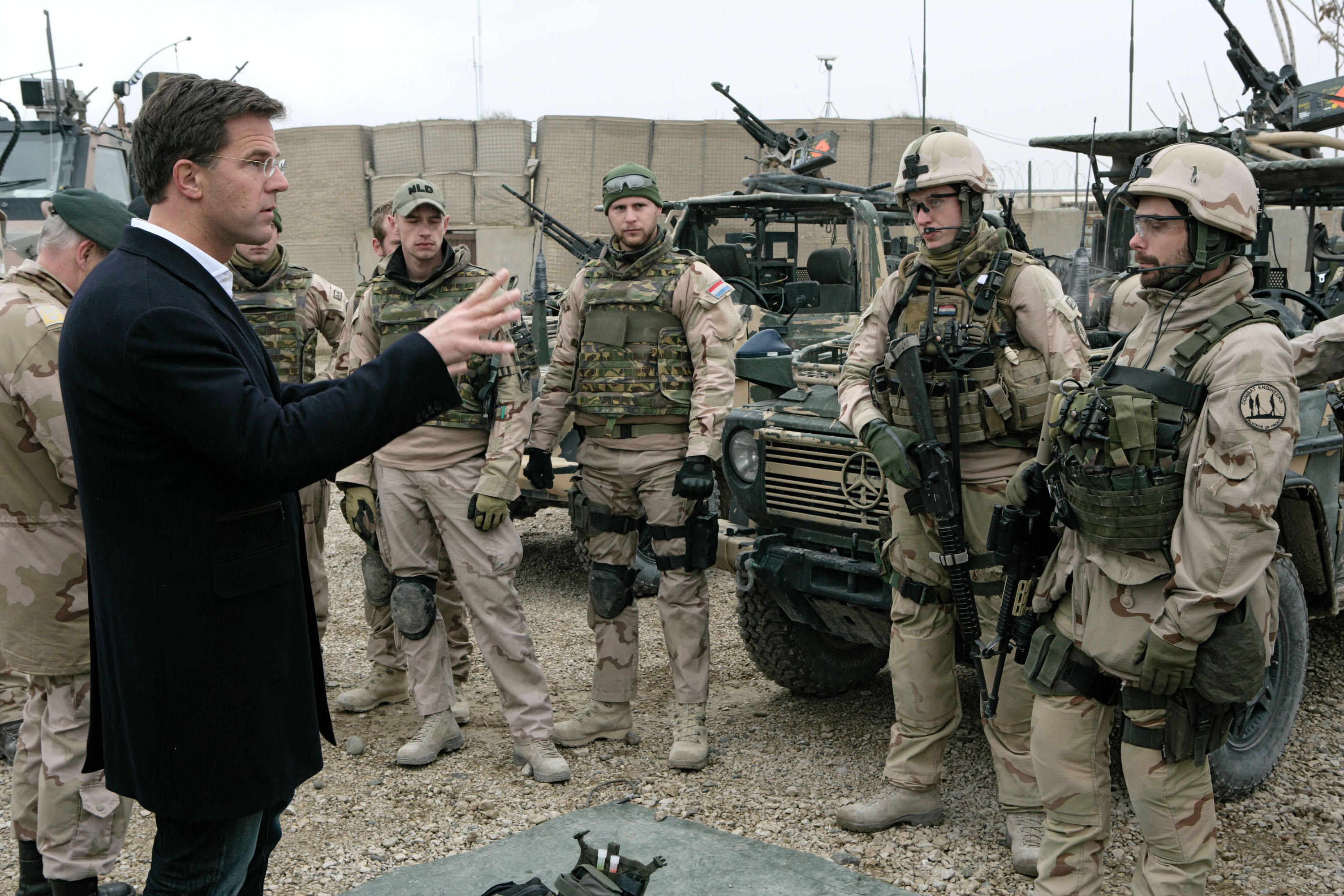
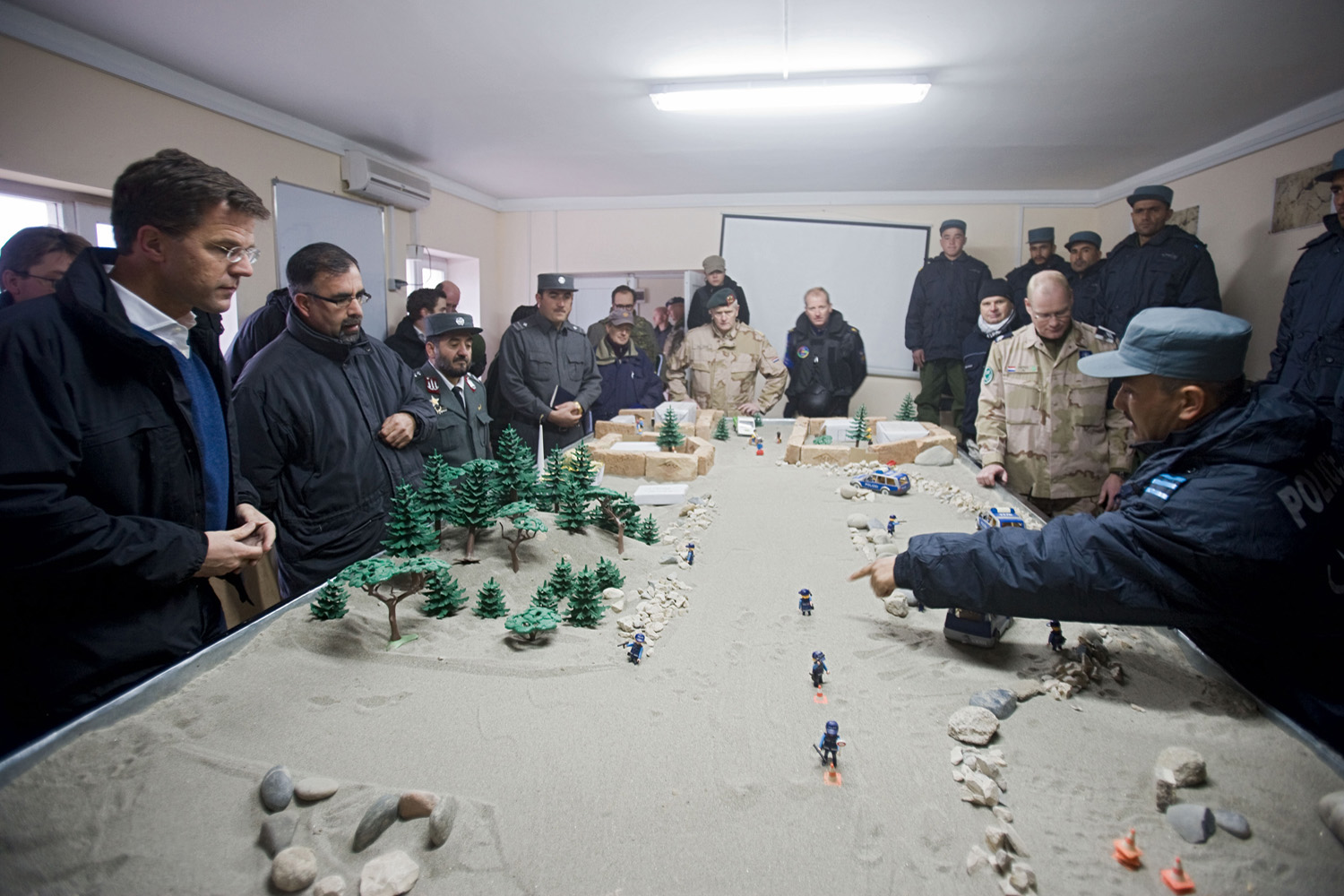
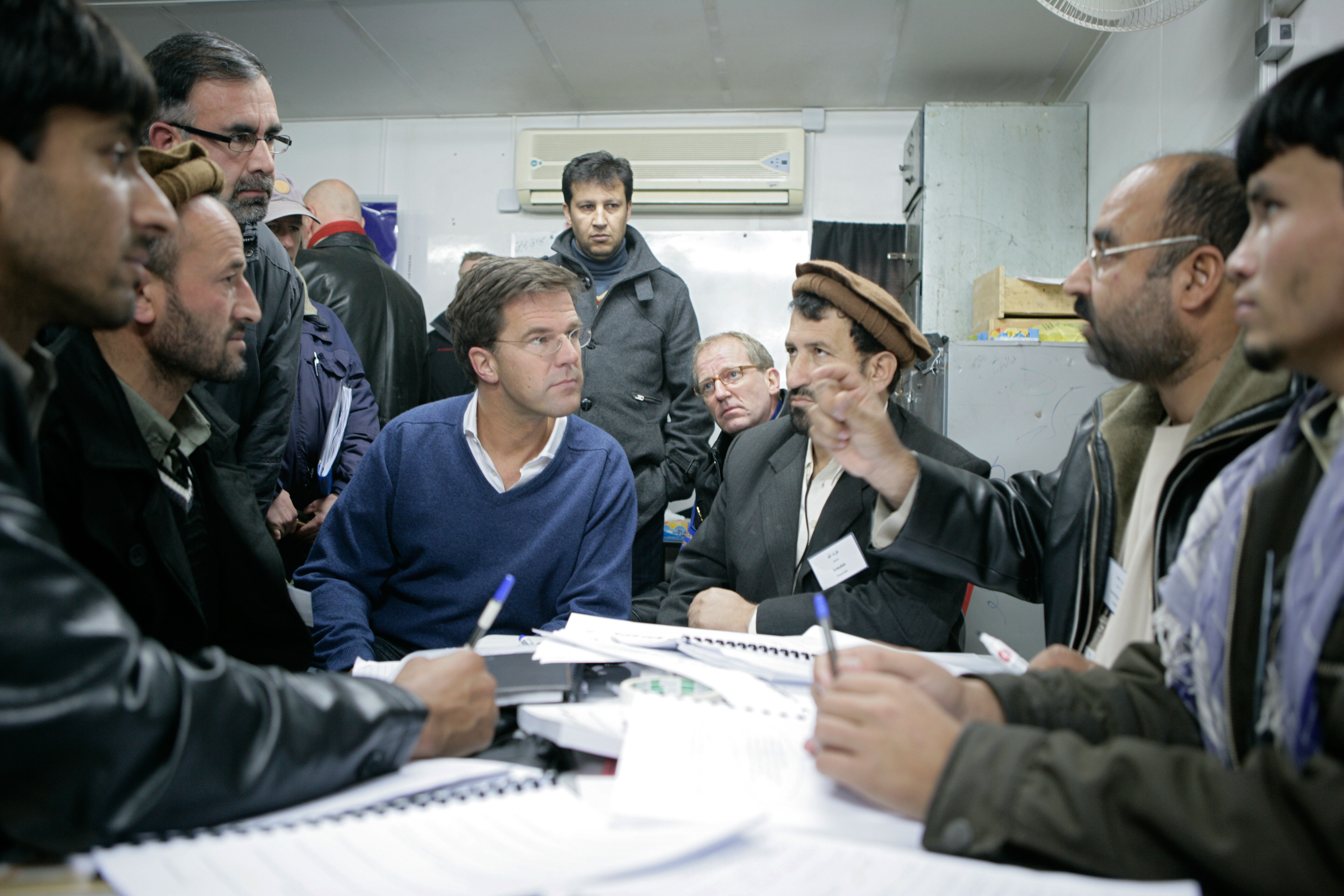
Mark Rutte visits the Dutch military in Afghanistan. (November 2011)
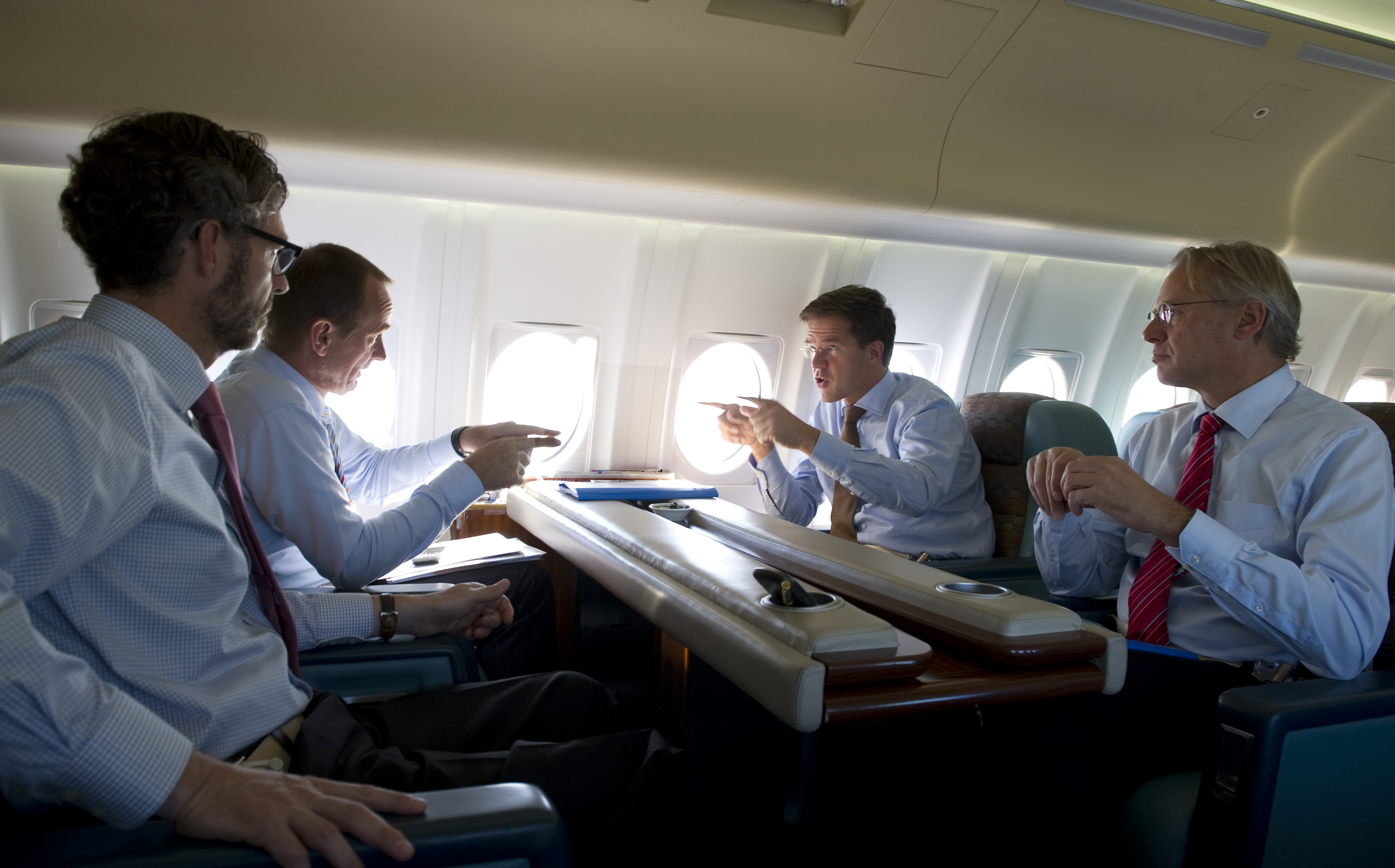
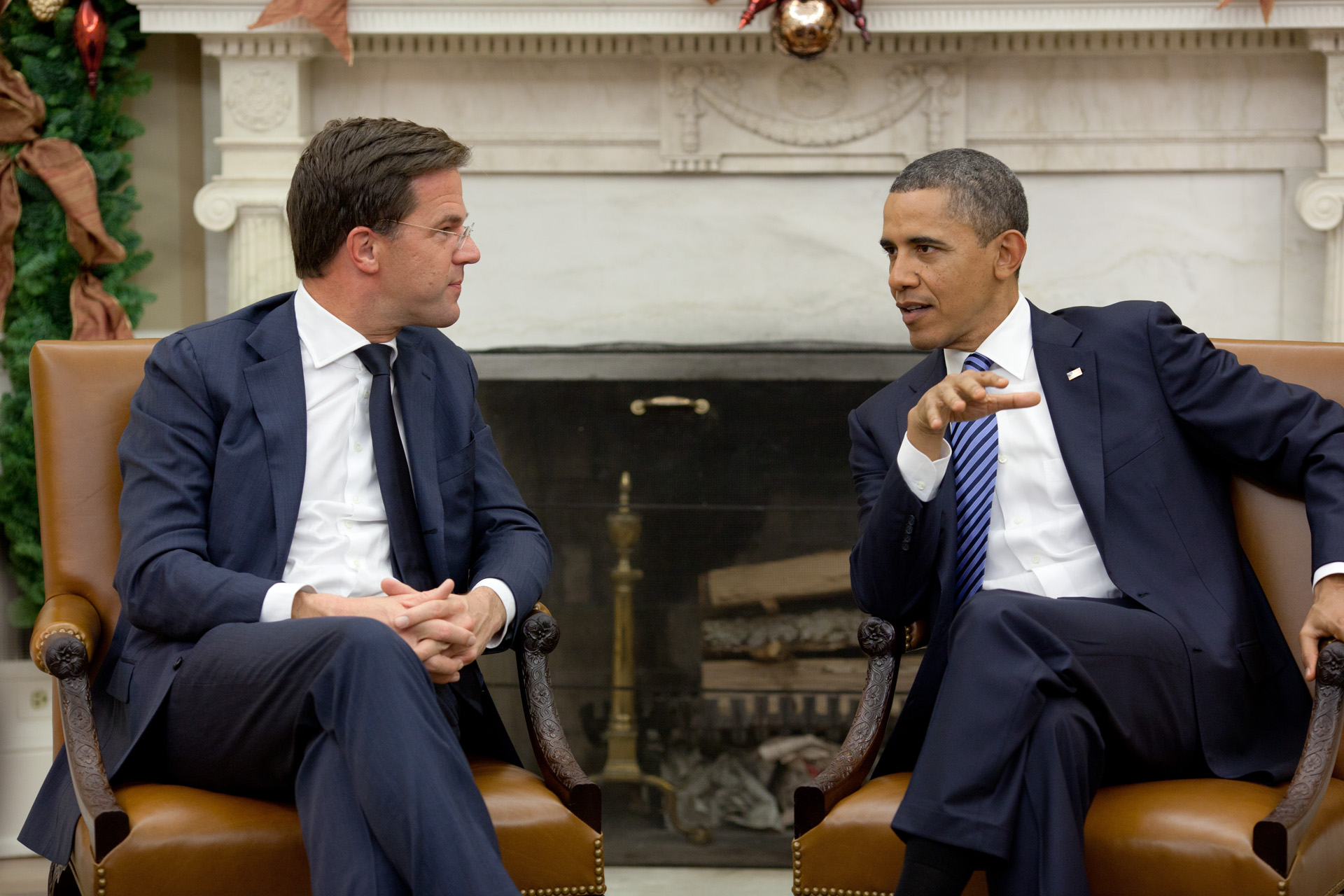
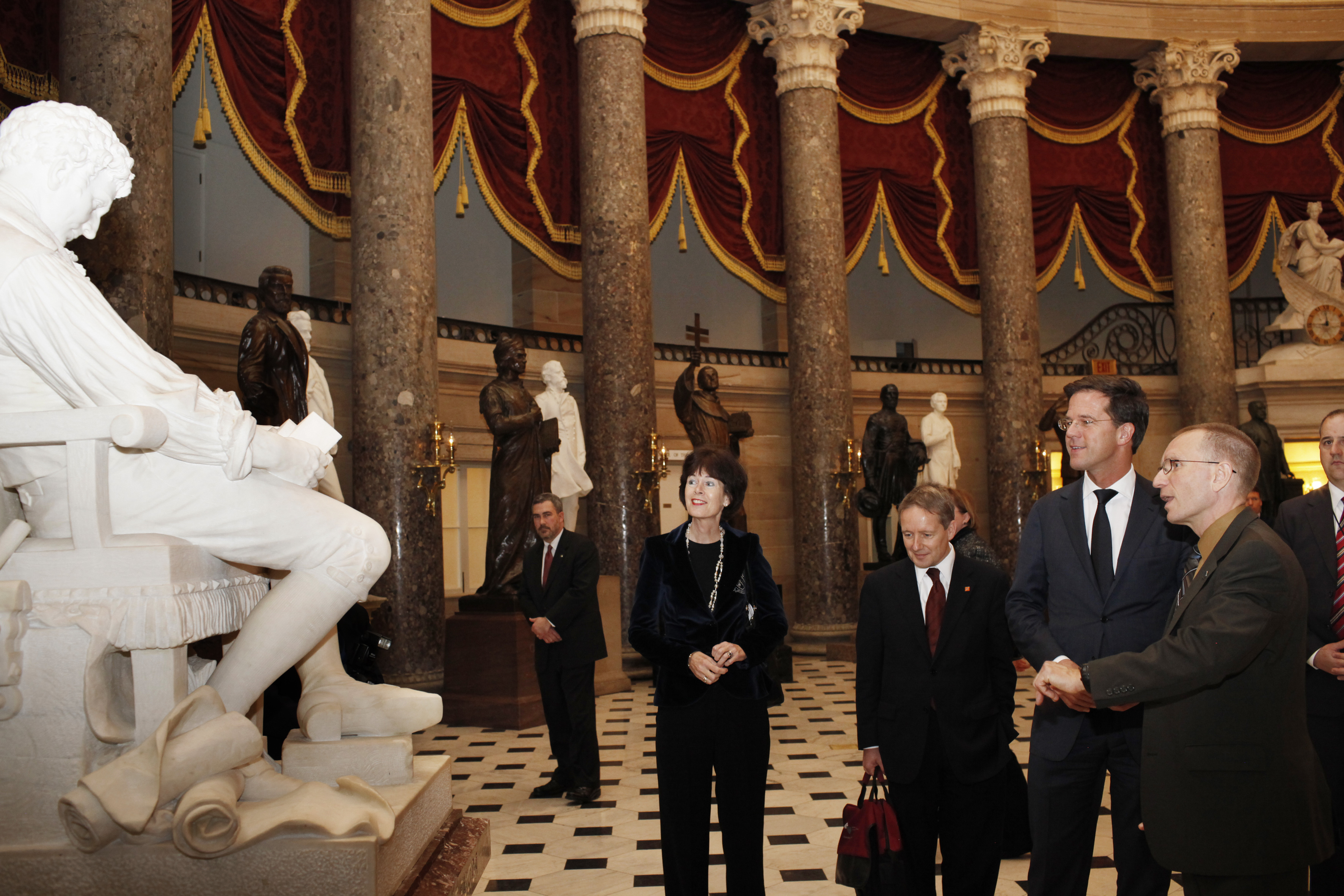
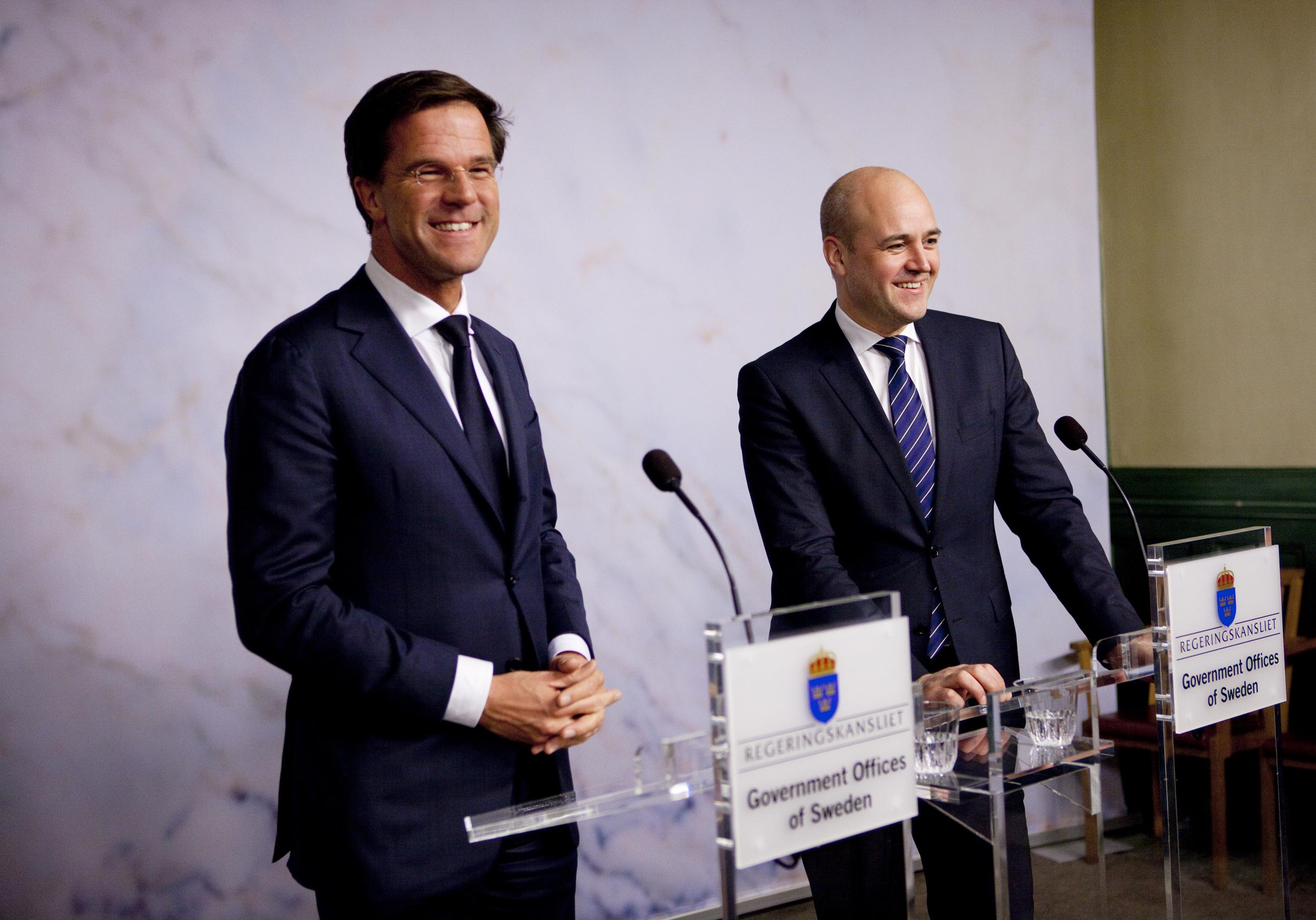
Impressions of Rutte's other trips in 2011.

| Country | Areas visited | Date(s) | Details |
|---|---|---|---|
| United Kingdom | London | 24 January | Rutte met with PM David Cameron. |
| Belgium | Brussels | 25 January | Rutte met with the president of the European Commission José Manuel Barroso. |
| Belgium | Brussels | 3-4 February | Rutte attended the European Council meeting. |
| Belgium | Brussels | 24-25 March | Rutte attended the European Council meeting. |
| Poland | Warsaw | 17 May | Rutte met with PM Donald Tusk. |
| Belgium | Brussels | 22-24 June | Rutte attended the European Council meeting. |
| Belgium | Brussels | 21 July | Rutte attended the European Council meeting. |
| France | Paris | 1 September | Rutte attended the NATO International Conference on the Future of Libya. |
| Poland | Warsaw | 29 September | Rutte attended the Eastern Partnership Summit. |
| Germany | Berlin | 7 October | Rutte met with Chancellor Angela Merkel. |
| France | Paris | 17 October | Rutte met with President Nicolas Sarkozy |
| Russia | Moscow, Saint Petersburg | 21 October | Rutte was part of a trade mission. |
| Belgium | Brussels | 23 October | Rutte attended the European Council meeting. |
| Belgium | Brussels | 27-28 October | Rutte attended the European Council meeting. |
| Germany | Lubmin | 8 November | Rutte opened Nord Stream 1 together with Francois Fillon, Angela Merkel, Dmitry Medvedev, Günther Oettinger and Erwin Sellering. |
| United Kingdom | Birmingham, London | 14-15 November | Rutte met with PM David Cameron. |
| United States | Washington, D.C. | 29 November | Rutte met with President Barack Obama. |
| Italy | Rome | 5 December | Rutte met with PM Mario Monti. |
| Sweden | Stockholm | 5 December | Rutte met with PM Fredrik Reinfeldt. |
| Belgium | Brussels | 8-9 December | Rutte attended the European Council meeting. |
| Afghanistan | Kunduz | 14-15 December | Rutte visited the Dutch military's police instructors. |

== 2012 ==
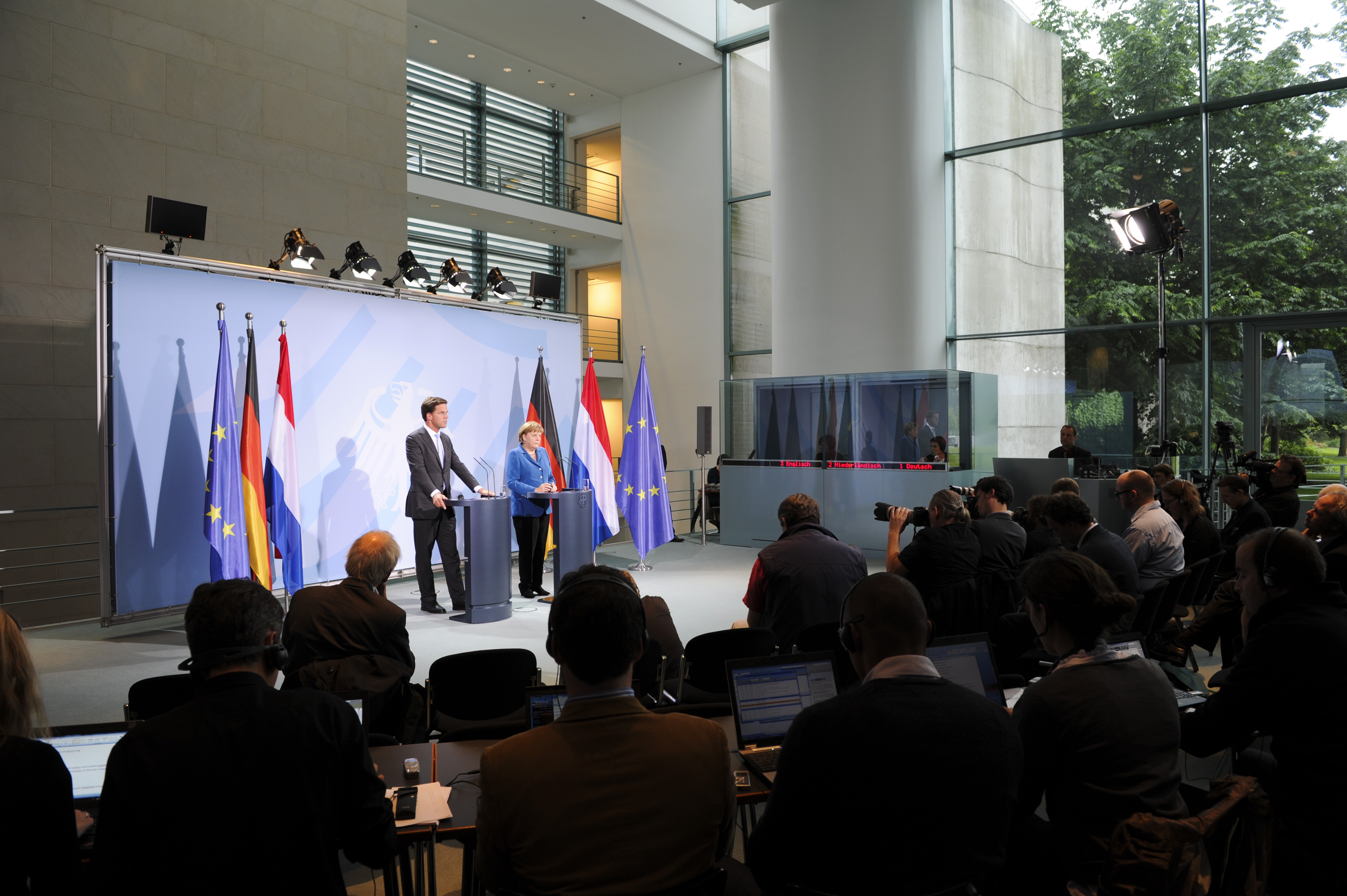
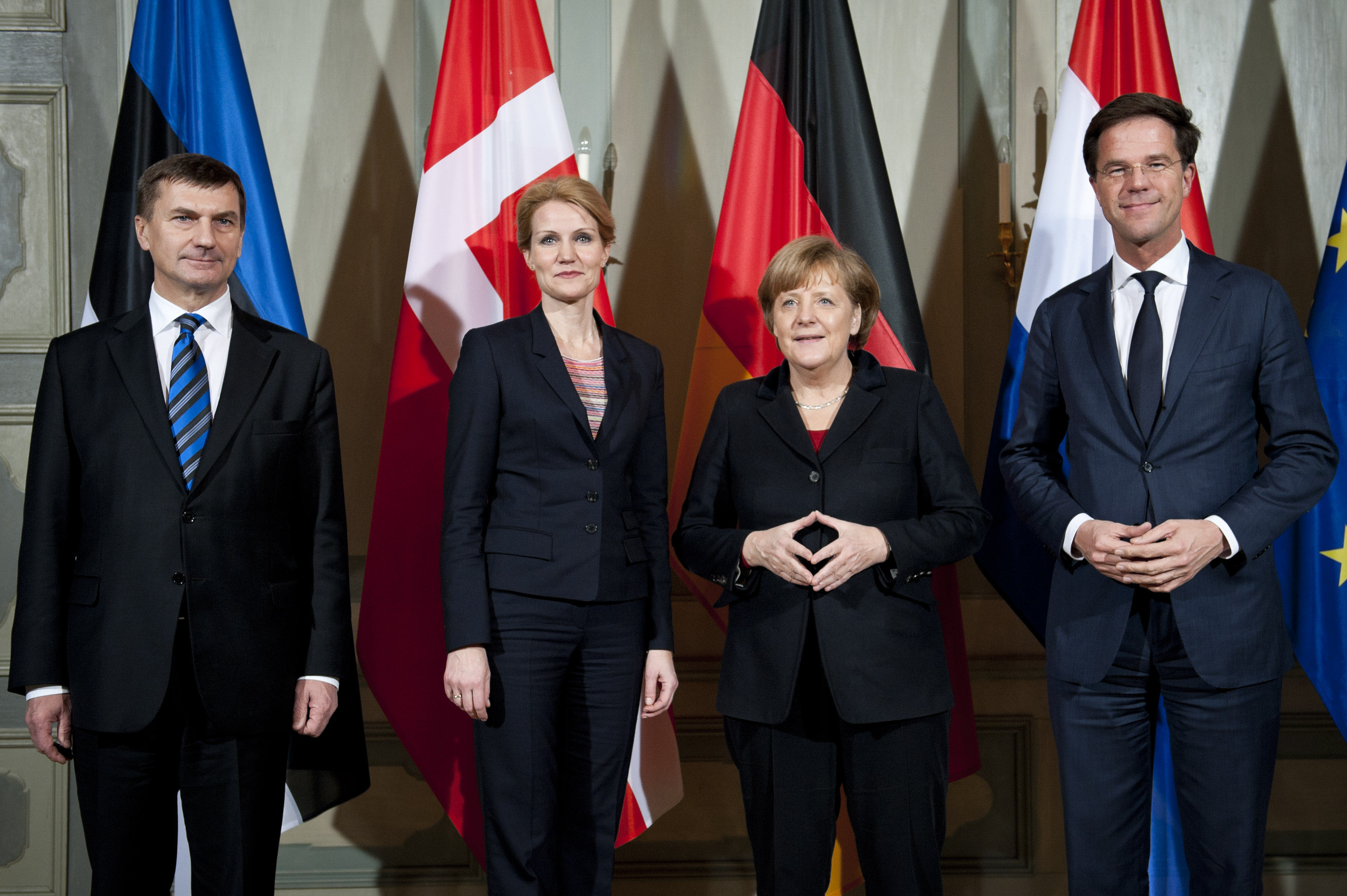
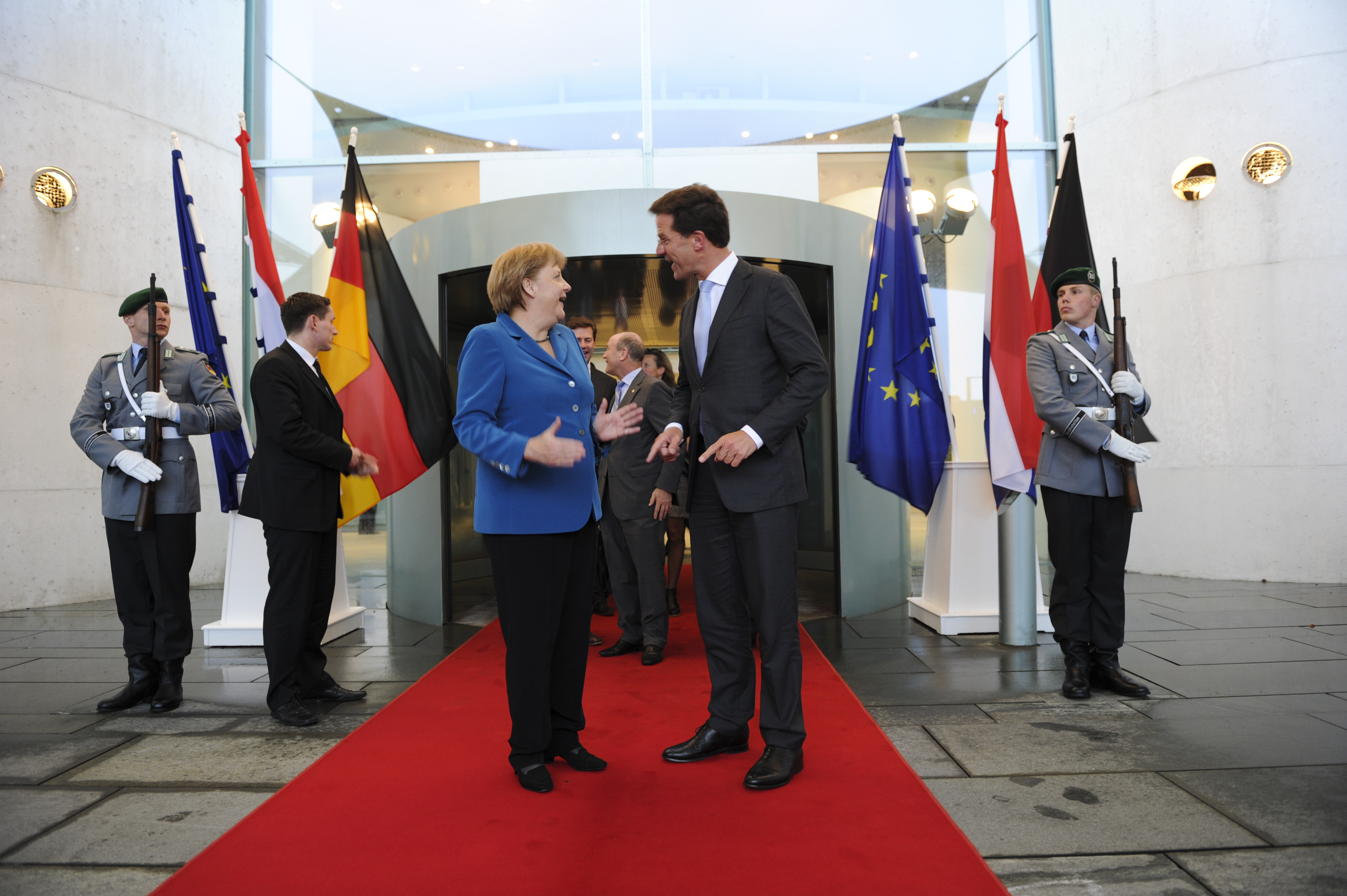
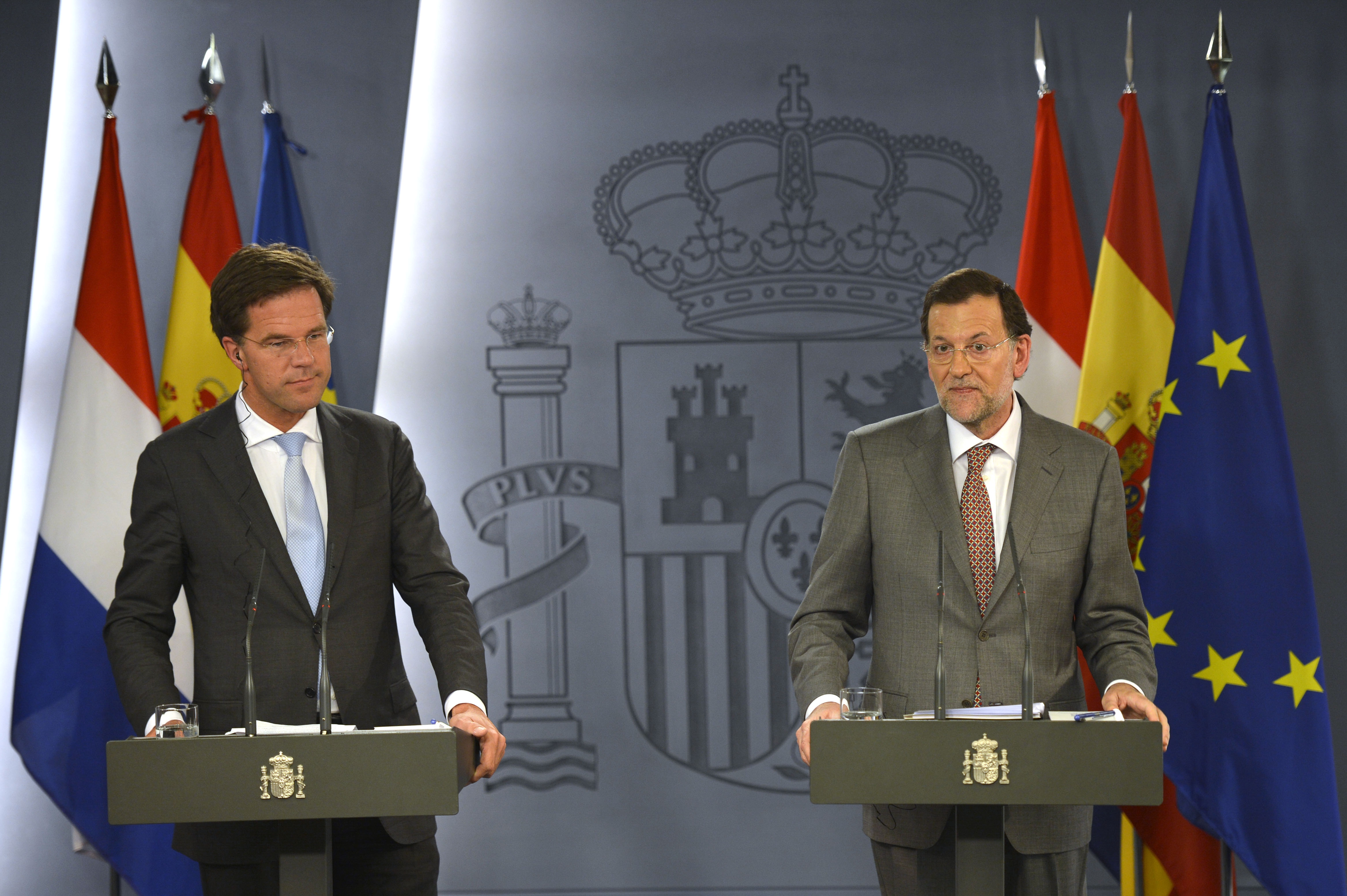
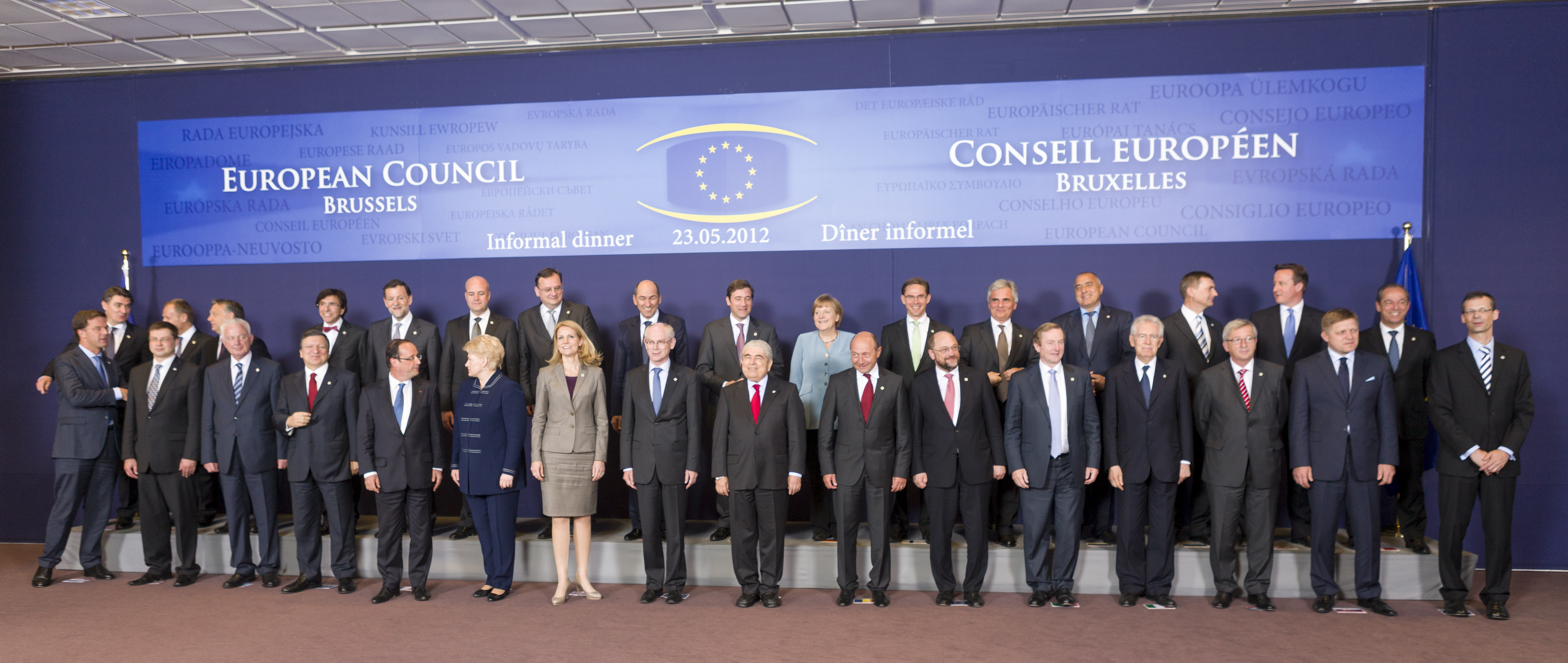
Impressions of Rutte's trips in 2012.

| Country | Areas visited | Date(s) | Details |
|---|---|---|---|
| Switzerland | Davos | 26-27 January | Rutte attended the World Economic Forum where he met with Bill Gates. |
| Belgium | Brussels | 30-31 January | Rutte attended the European Council meeting. |
| Germany | Berlin | 13 February | Rutte met with Chancellor Angela Merkel, and his Danish and Estonian counterparts. |
| Belgium | Brussels | 1-2 March | Rutte attended the European Council meeting. |
| United States | Chicago | 19-22 May | Rutte attended the NATO 2012 Chicago summit. |
| United States | Chantilly, Virginia | 1-2 June | Rutte attended the 2012 Bilderberg Conference. |
| Spain | Madrid | 7 June | Rutte met with PM Mariano Rajoy. |
| Portugal | Lisbon | 7 June | Rutte met with PM Passos Coelho. |
| Germany | Berlin | 20 June | Rutte met with Chancellor Angela Merkel. |
| Belgium | Brussels | 28-29 June | Rutte attended the European Council meeting. |
| United Kingdom | London | 28 July | Rutte attended the opening ceremony of the 2012 Summer Olympics. |
| Belgium | Brussels | 18-19 October | Rutte attended the European Council meeting. |
| Turkey | Ankara | 5-6 November | Rutte was part of a trade mission. |
| Belgium | Brussels | 22-23 November | Rutte attended the European Council meeting. |
| Norway | Oslo | 10 December | Rutte attended the Nobel Peace Prize award ceremony. |
| France | Paris | 12 December | Rutte met with President François Hollande. |
| Belgium | Brussels | 13-14 December | Rutte attended the European Council meeting. |

== 2013 ==
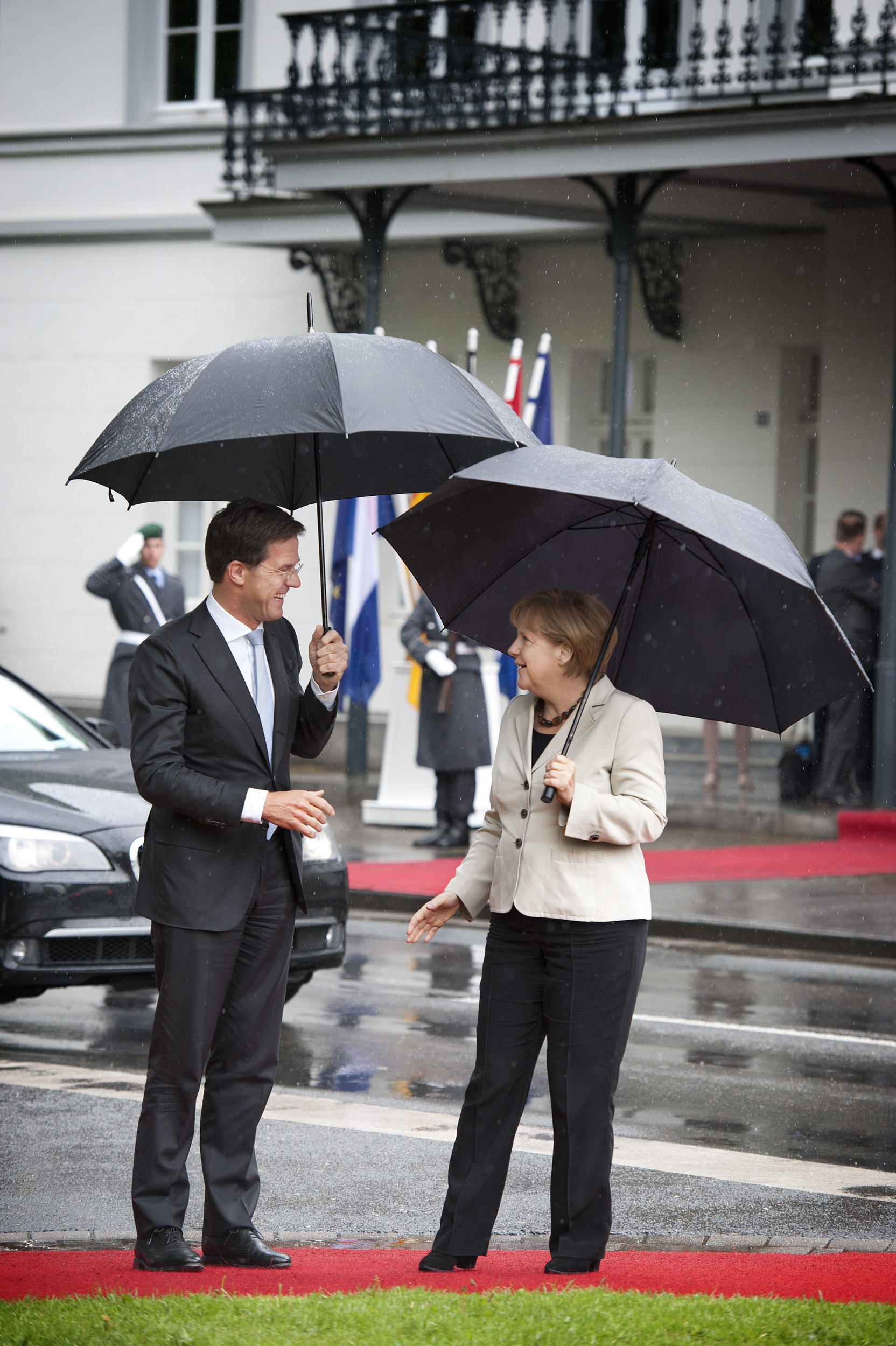
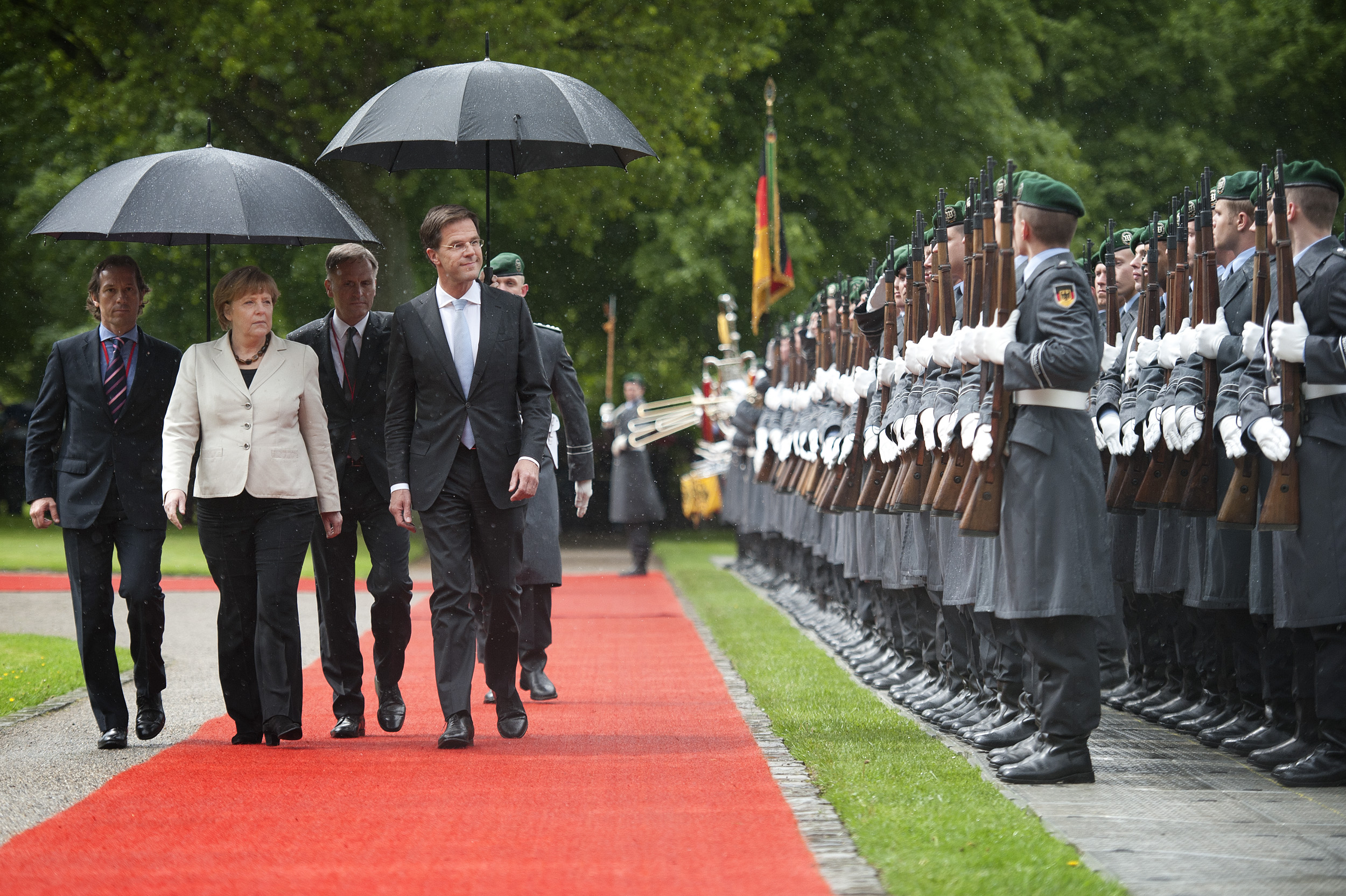
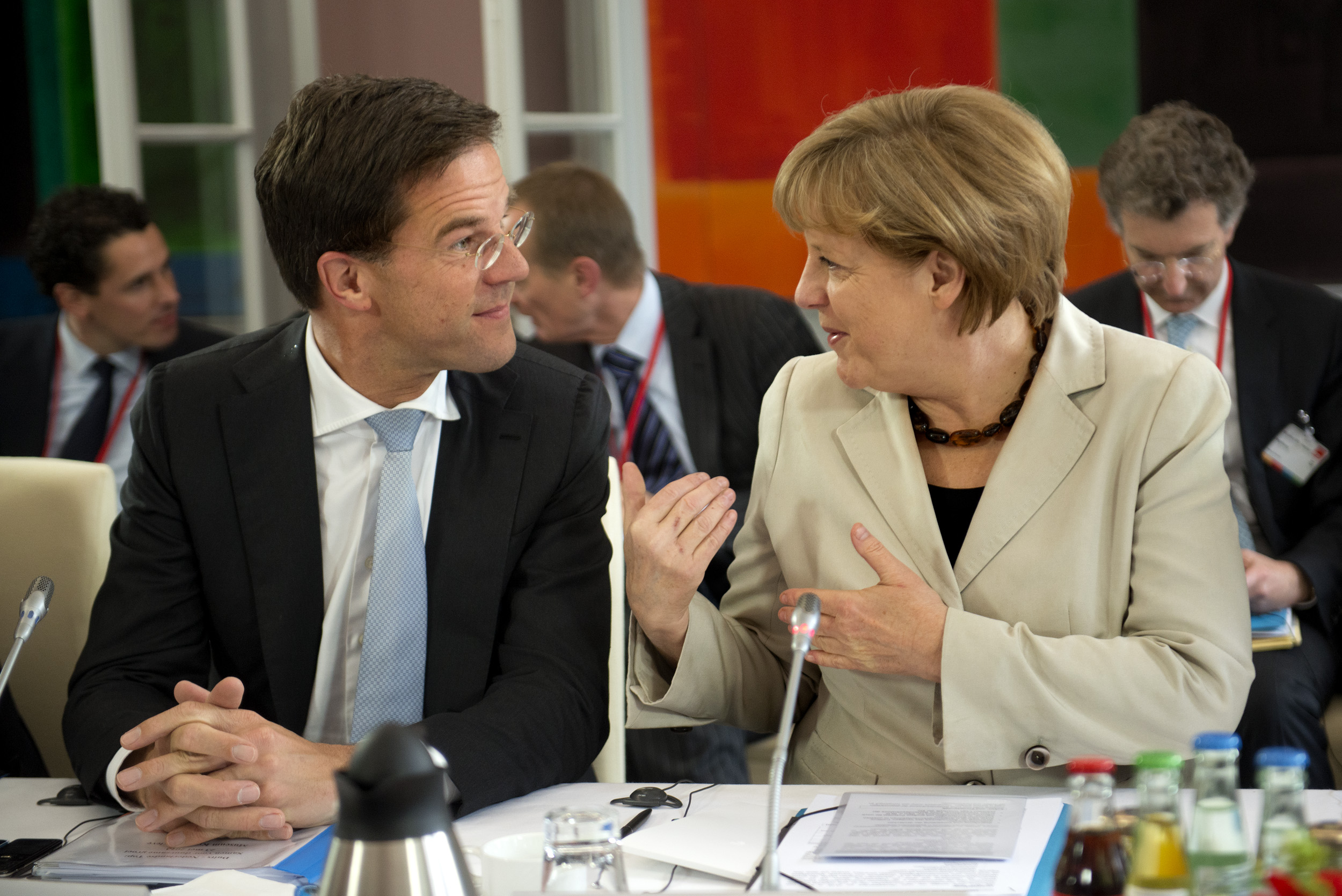
Impressions of Rutte's encounters with Angela Merkel in 2013.
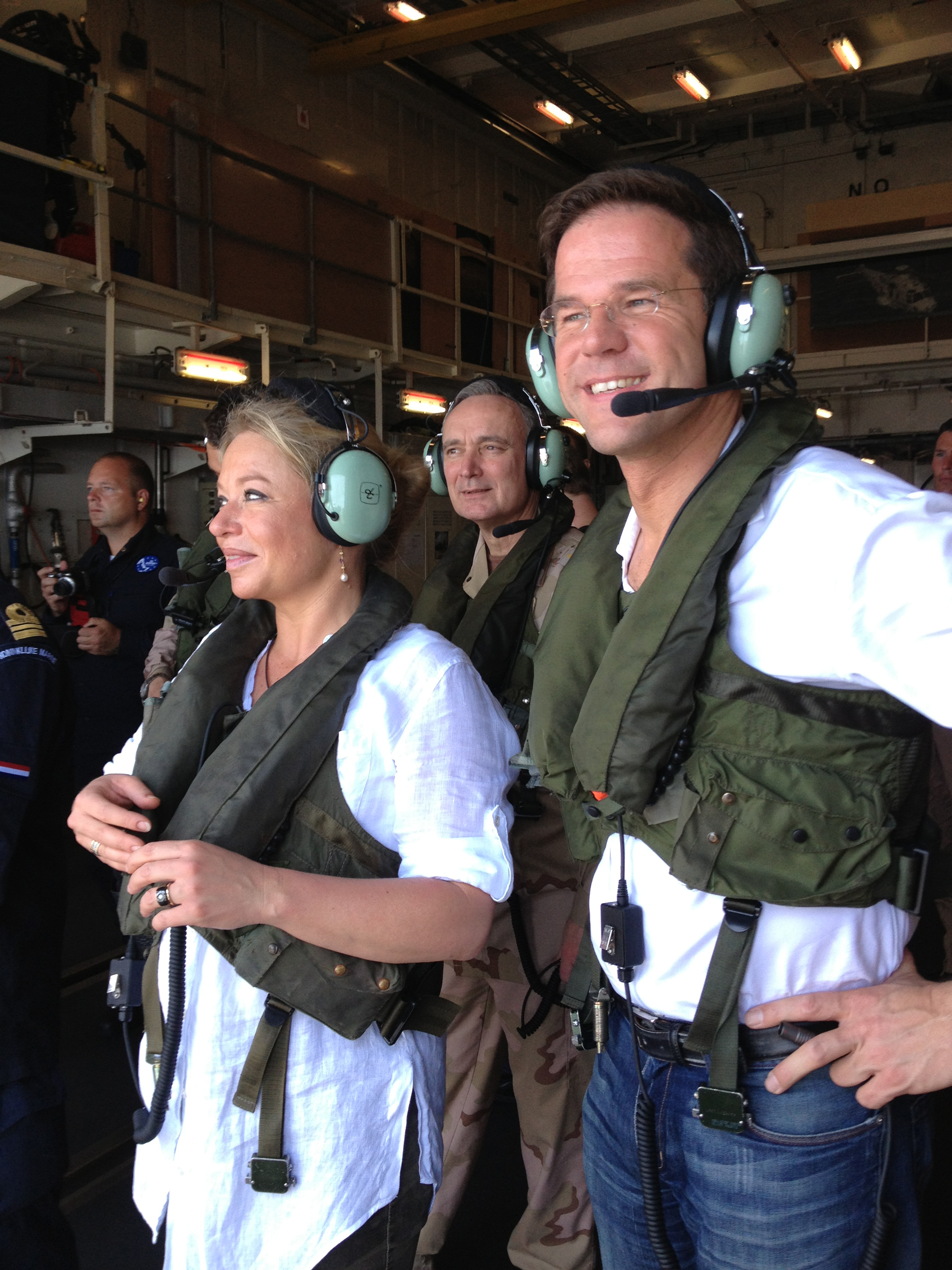
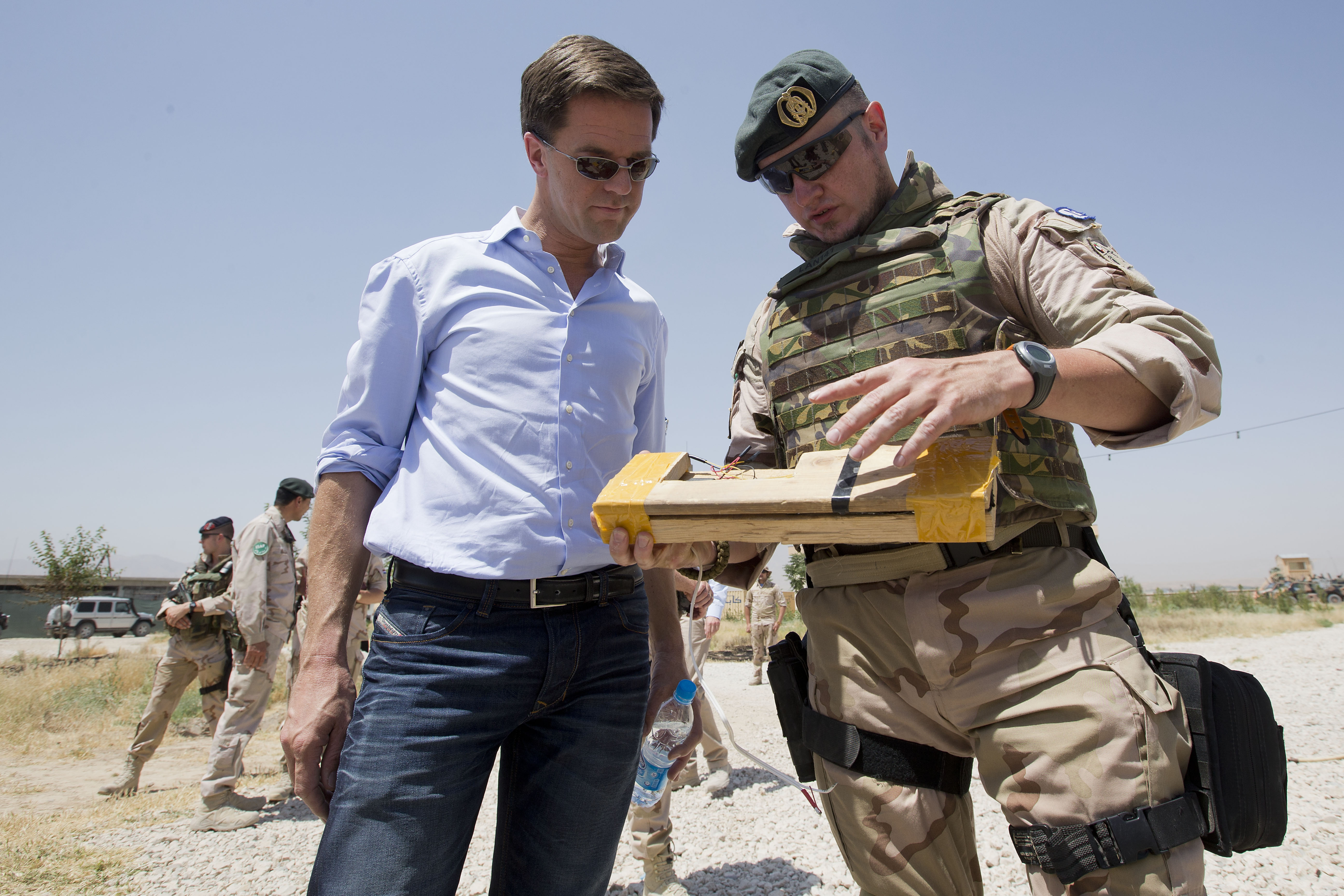
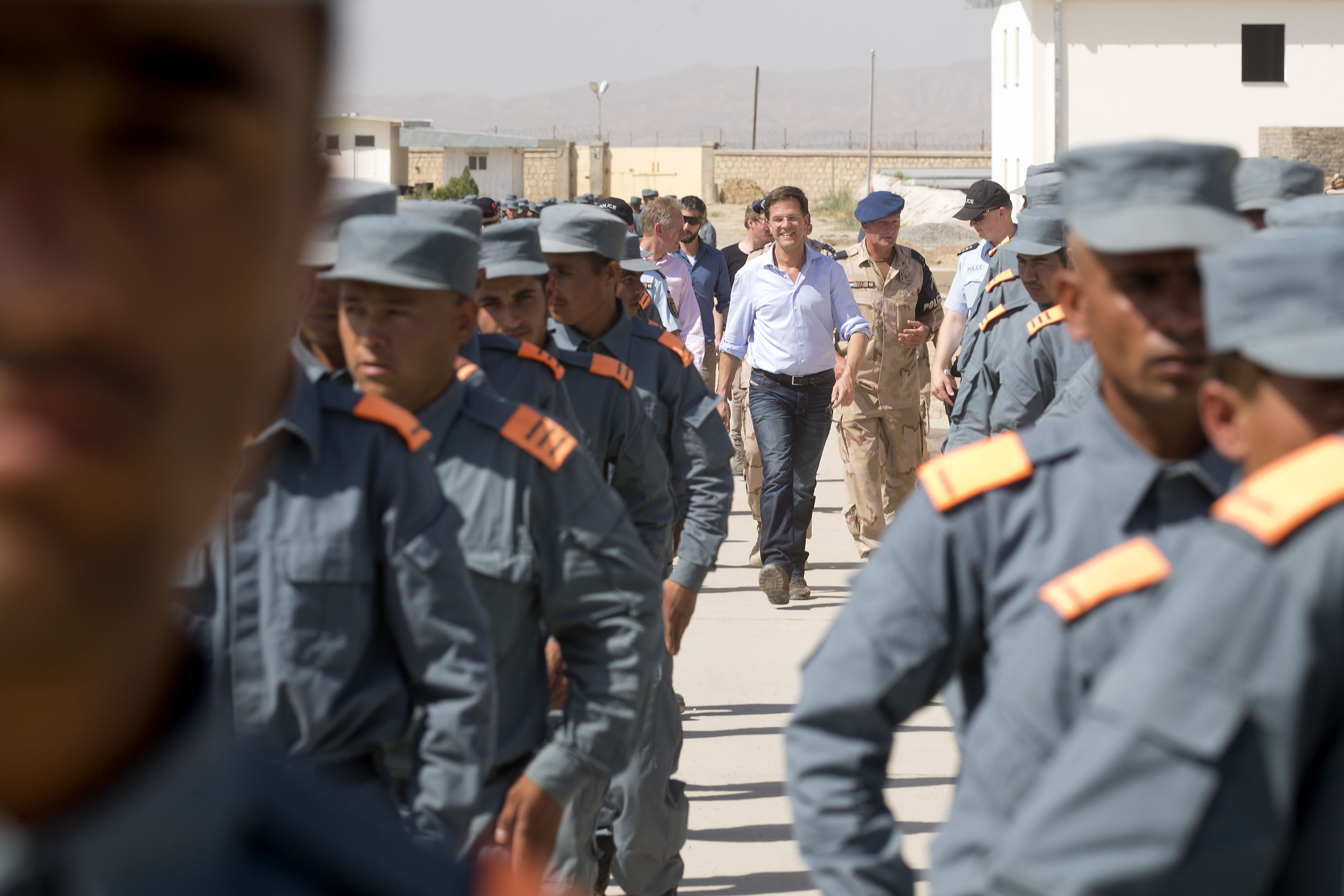
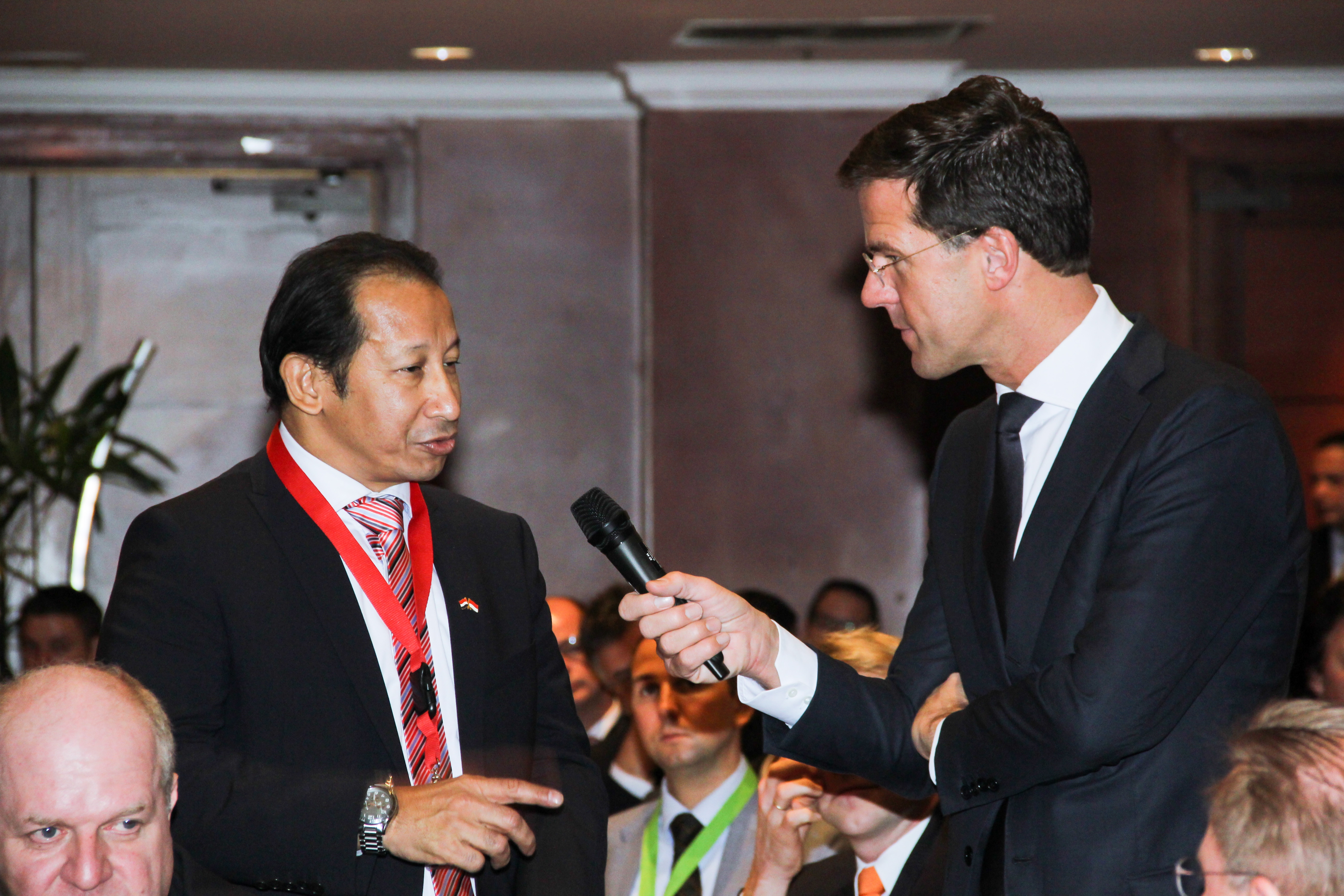
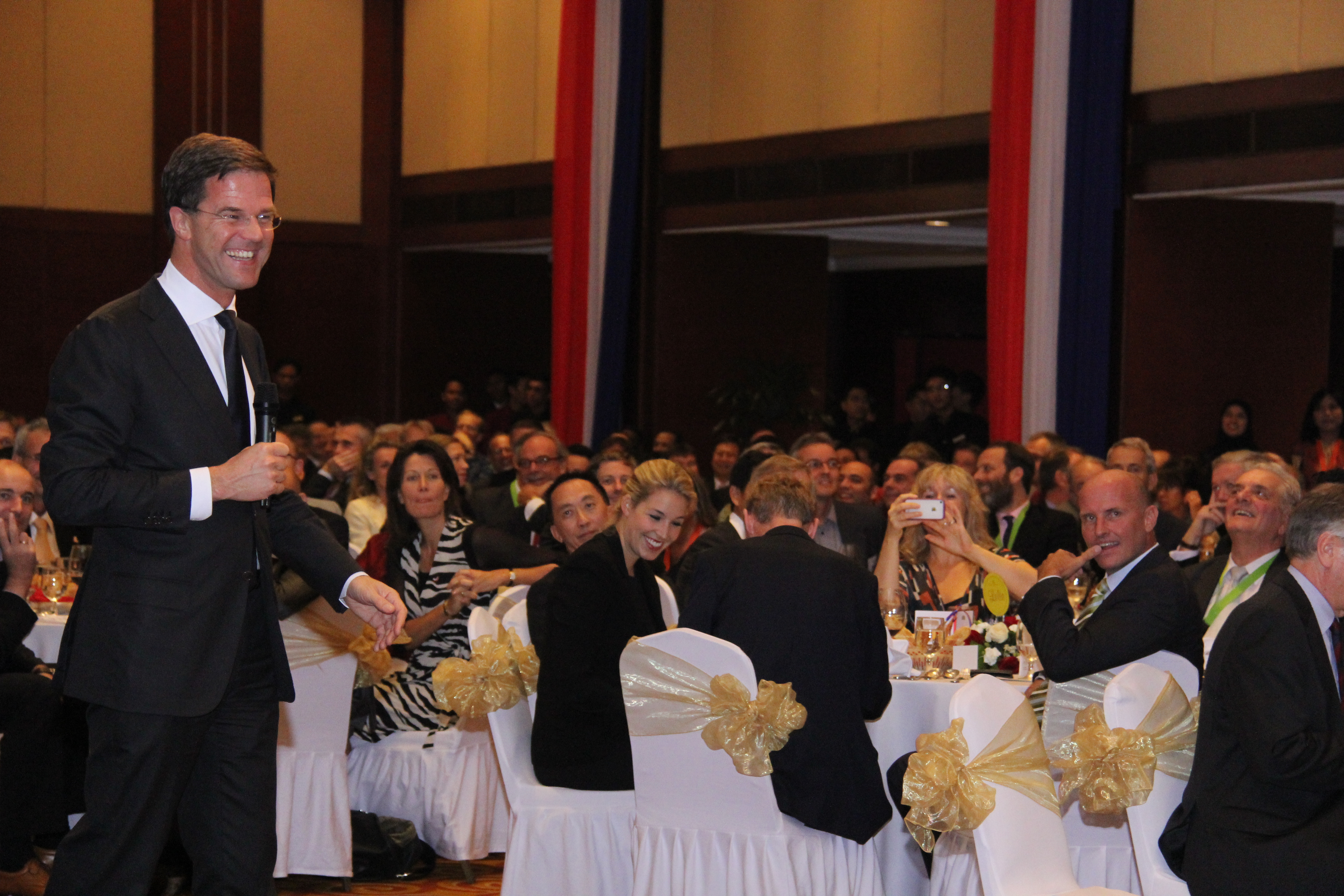
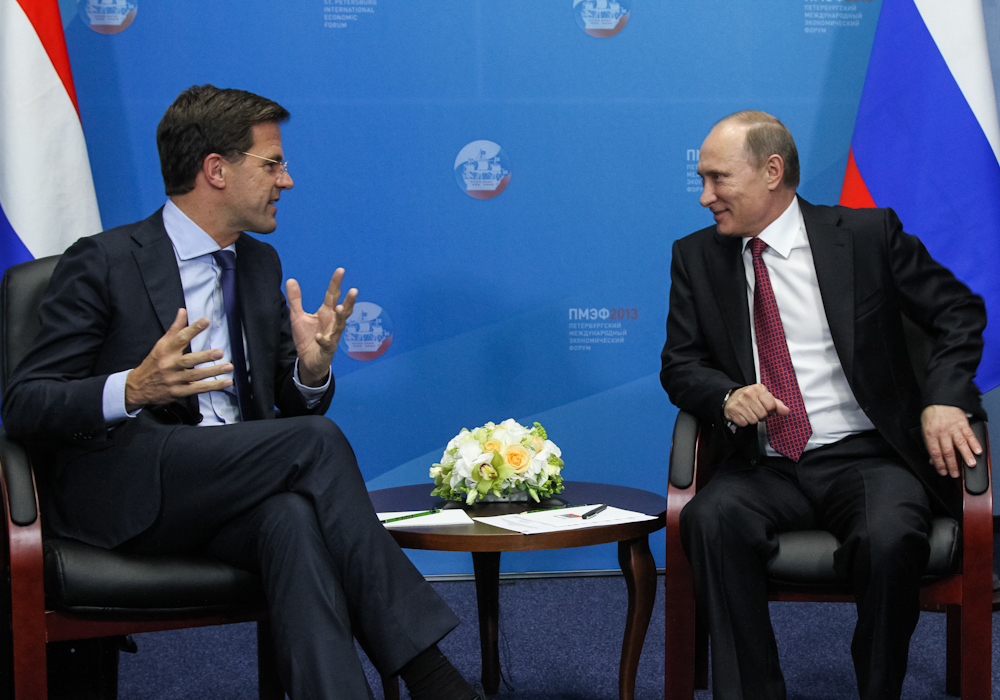
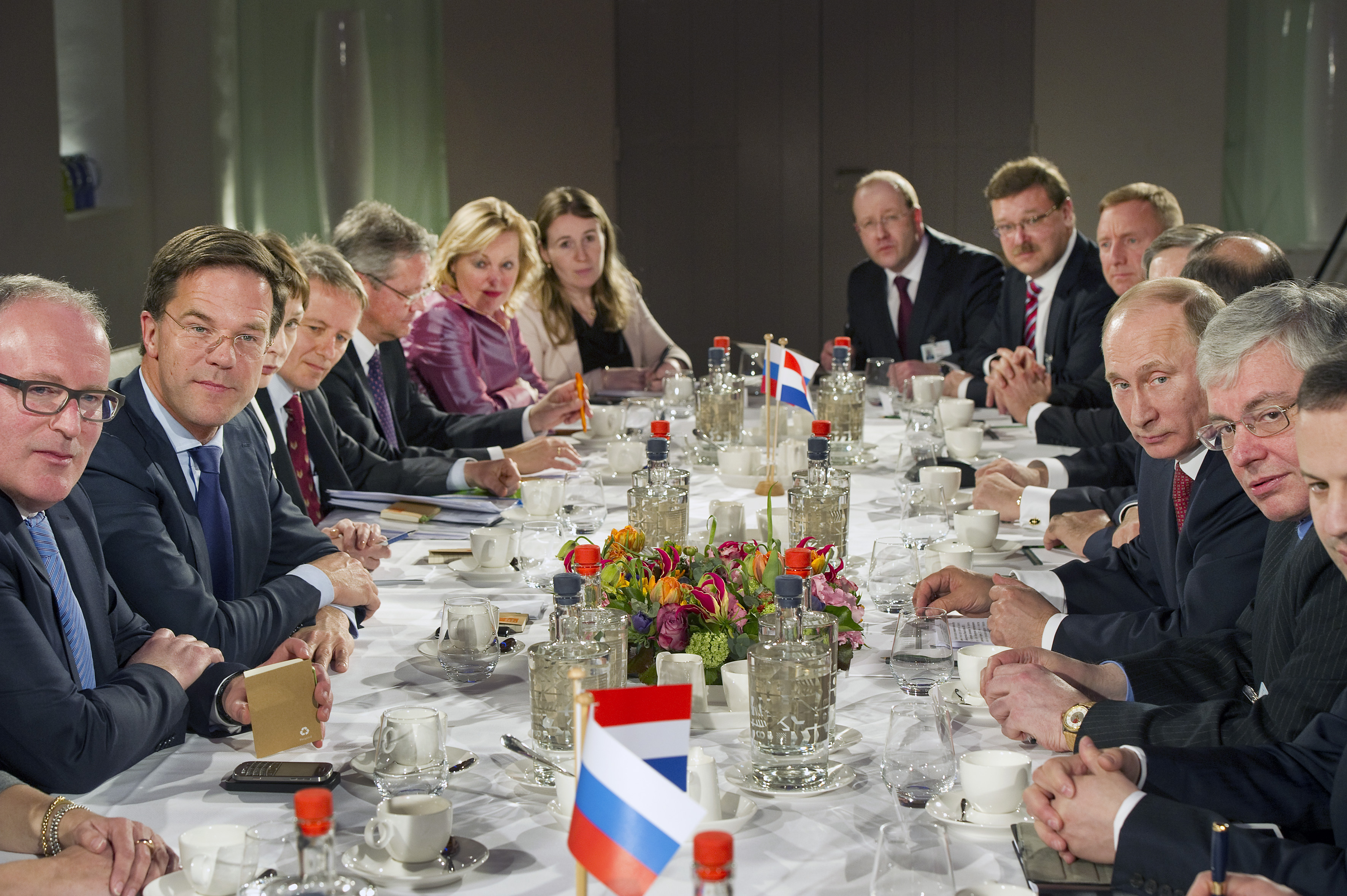
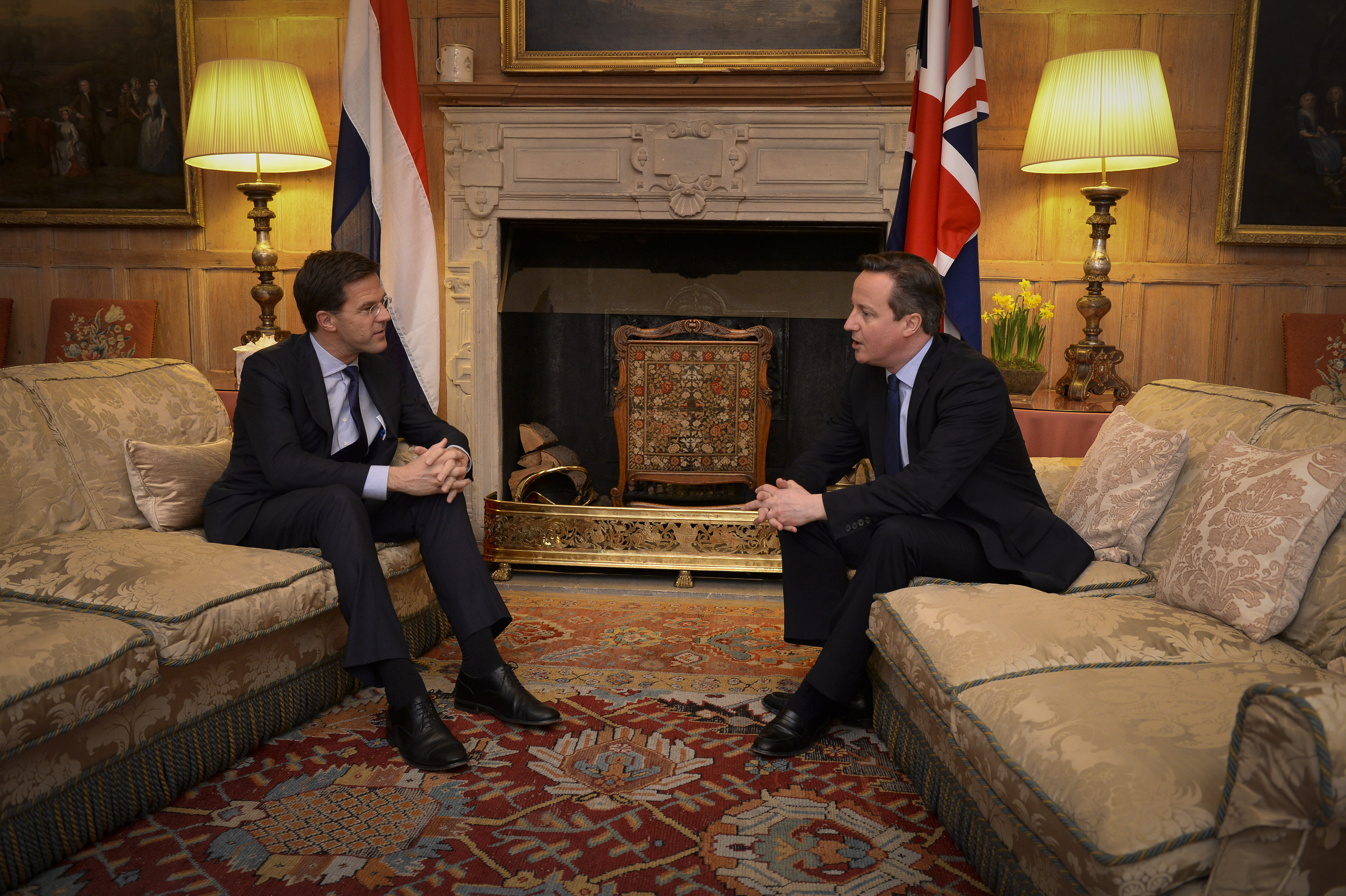
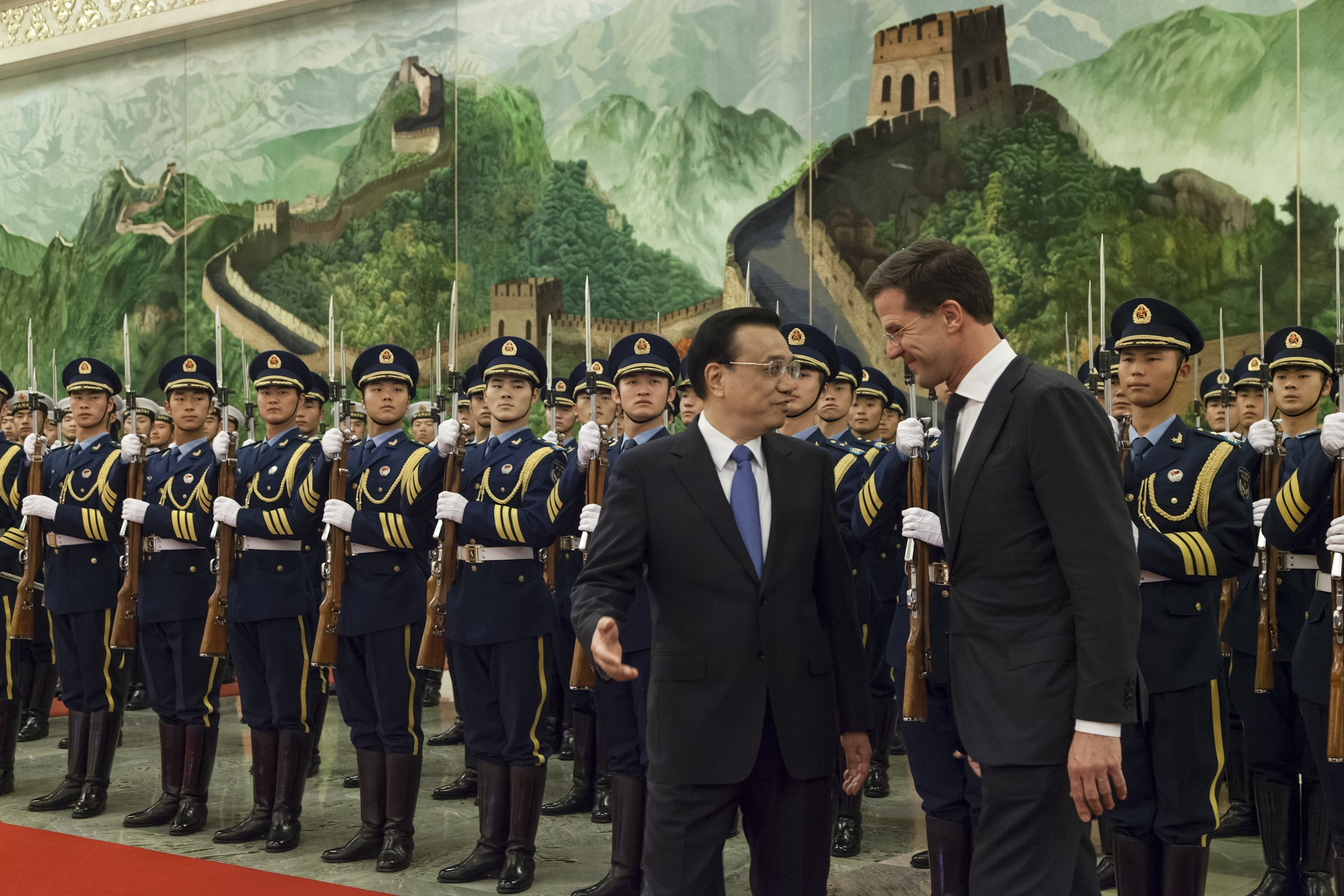
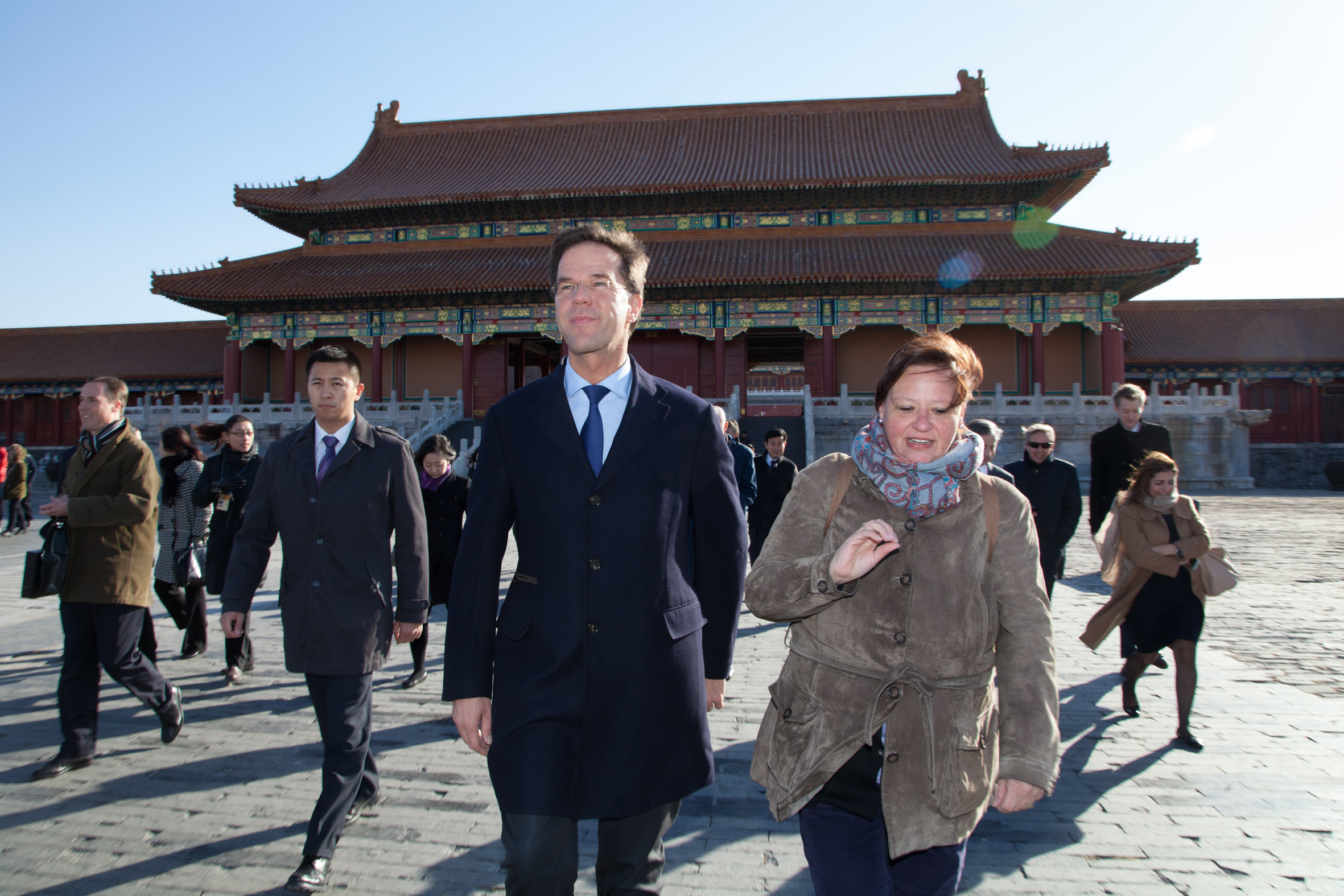
Impressions of Rutte's visits in 2013.

| Country | Areas visited | Date(s) | Details |
|---|---|---|---|
| Switzerland | Davos | 24-25 January | Rutte attended the World Economic Forum. |
| Belgium | Brussels | 7-8 February | Rutte attended the European Council meeting. |
| Belgium | Brussels | 14-15 March | Rutte attended the European Council meeting. |
| Vatican City | Vatican City | 19 March | Rutte attended the inauguration of Pope Francis together with Prince Willem-Alexander and Princess Máxima Zorreguieta. |
| Somalia | Gulf of Aden | 6 April | Rutte visited an anti-pirate mission. |
| Belgium | Brussels | 22-23 May | Rutte attended the European Council meeting. |
| Afghanistan | Kunduz | 1 June | Rutte visited the Dutch military post in Afghanistan. |
| Russia | Saint Petersburg | 20 June | Rutte attended the St. Petersburg International Economic Forum. |
| Germany | Berlin | 25 June | |
| Belgium | Brussels | 27-28 June | Rutte attended the European Council meeting. |
| Germany | Berlin | 3 July | Rutte attended a summit on youth employment. |
| United States | Texas | 7-9 July | Rutte was part of a trade mission. |
| Aruba | Oranjestad | 14-15 July | Rutte visits the Caribbean part of the Kingdom of the Netherlands. |
| Curaçao | Willemstad | 16-17 July | Rutte visits the Caribbean part of the Kingdom of the Netherlands. |
| Sint Maarten | Philipsburg | 18-20 July | Rutte visits the Caribbean part of the Kingdom of the Netherlands. |
| Belgium | Brussels | 23-25 October | Rutte attended the European Council meeting. |
| China | Beijing | 15-17 November | Rutte was part of a trade mission, and met with PM Li Keqiang President Xi Jinping. |
| Indonesia | Jakarta | 20-22 November | Rutte was part of a trade mission, and met with President Susilo Bambang Yudhoyono. |
| Israel | Tel Aviv, Jerusalem | 6-7 December | Rutte met with PM Benjamin Netanyahu and President Shimon Peres. |
| Palestine | Jerusalem, Betlehem | 8-9 December | Rutte met with Palestinian president Mahmoud Abbas and PM Rami Hamdallah. |
| Luxembourg | Luxembourg | 12 December | Rutte met with his Benelux counterparts. |
| Belgium | Brussels | 19-20 December | Rutte attended the European Council meeting. |

== 2014 ==
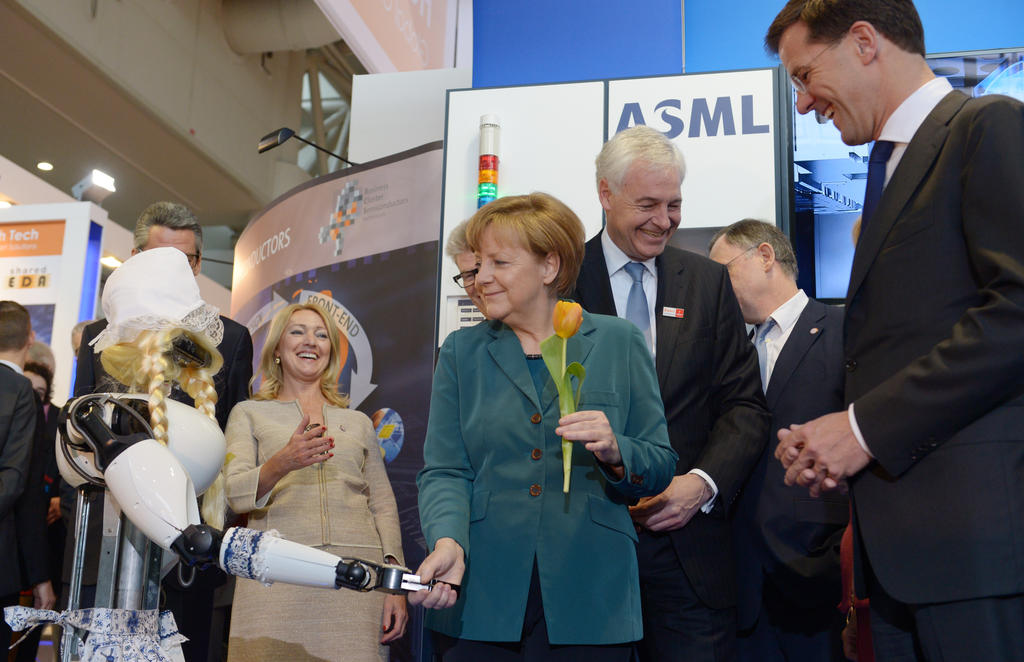
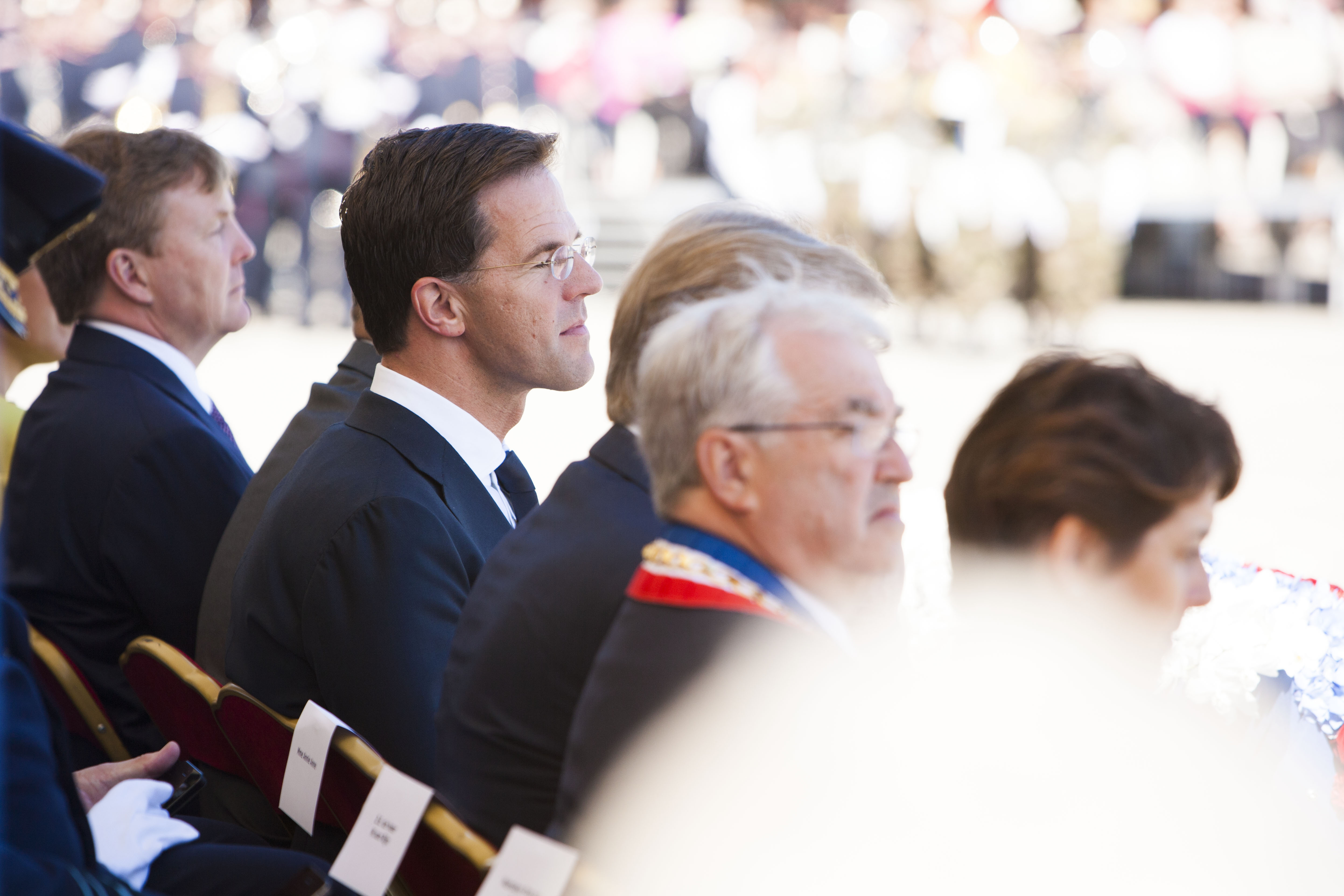
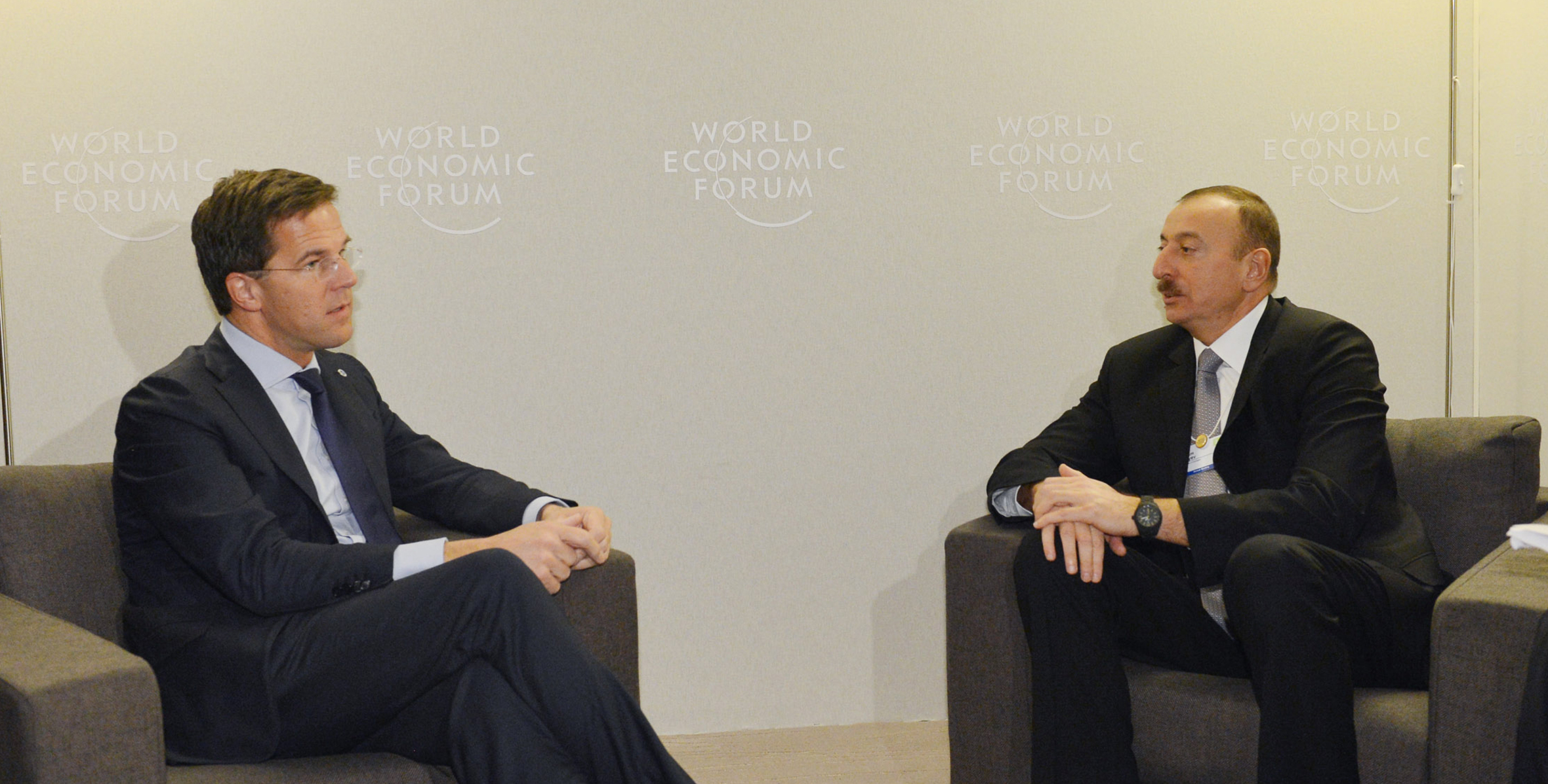
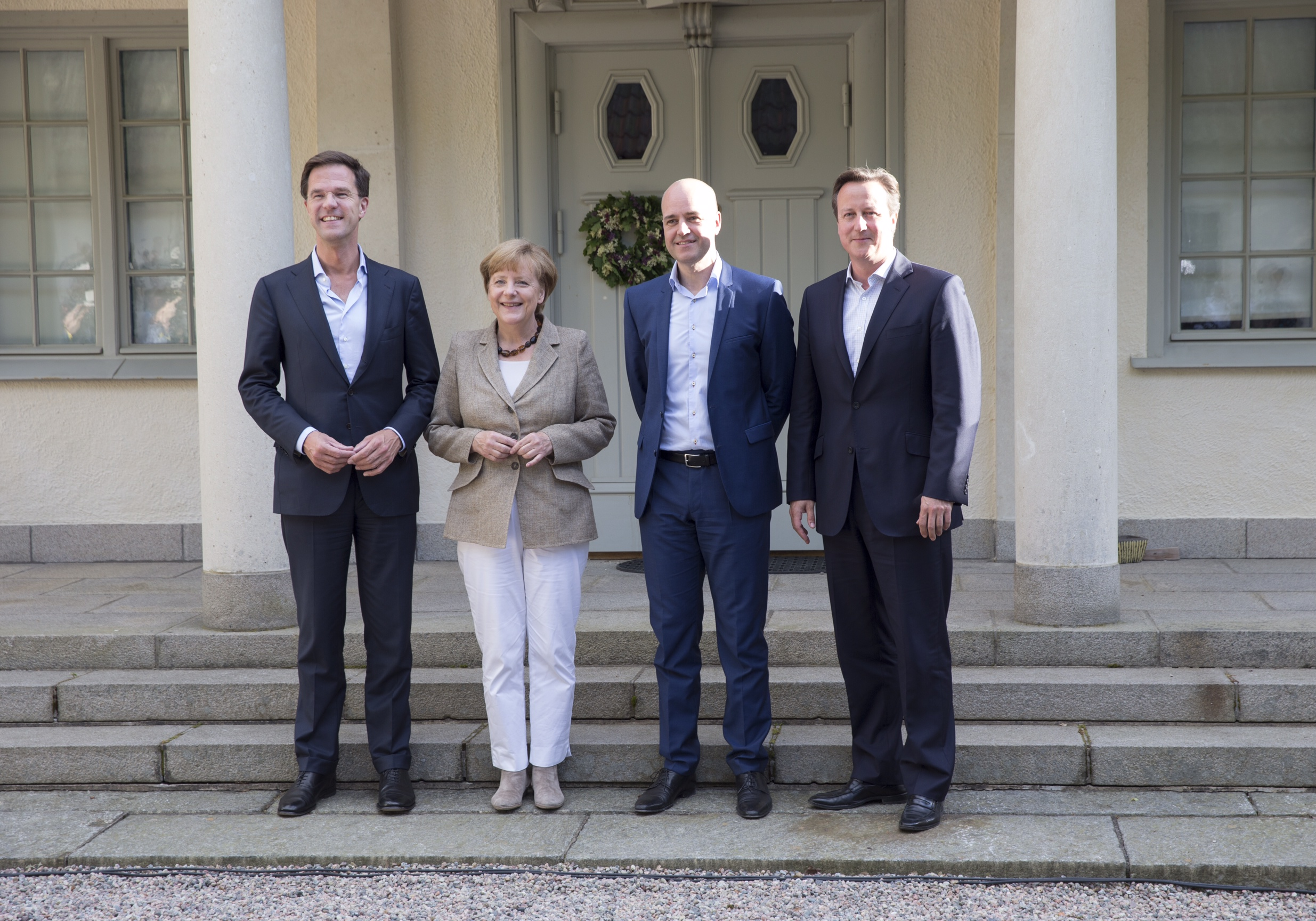
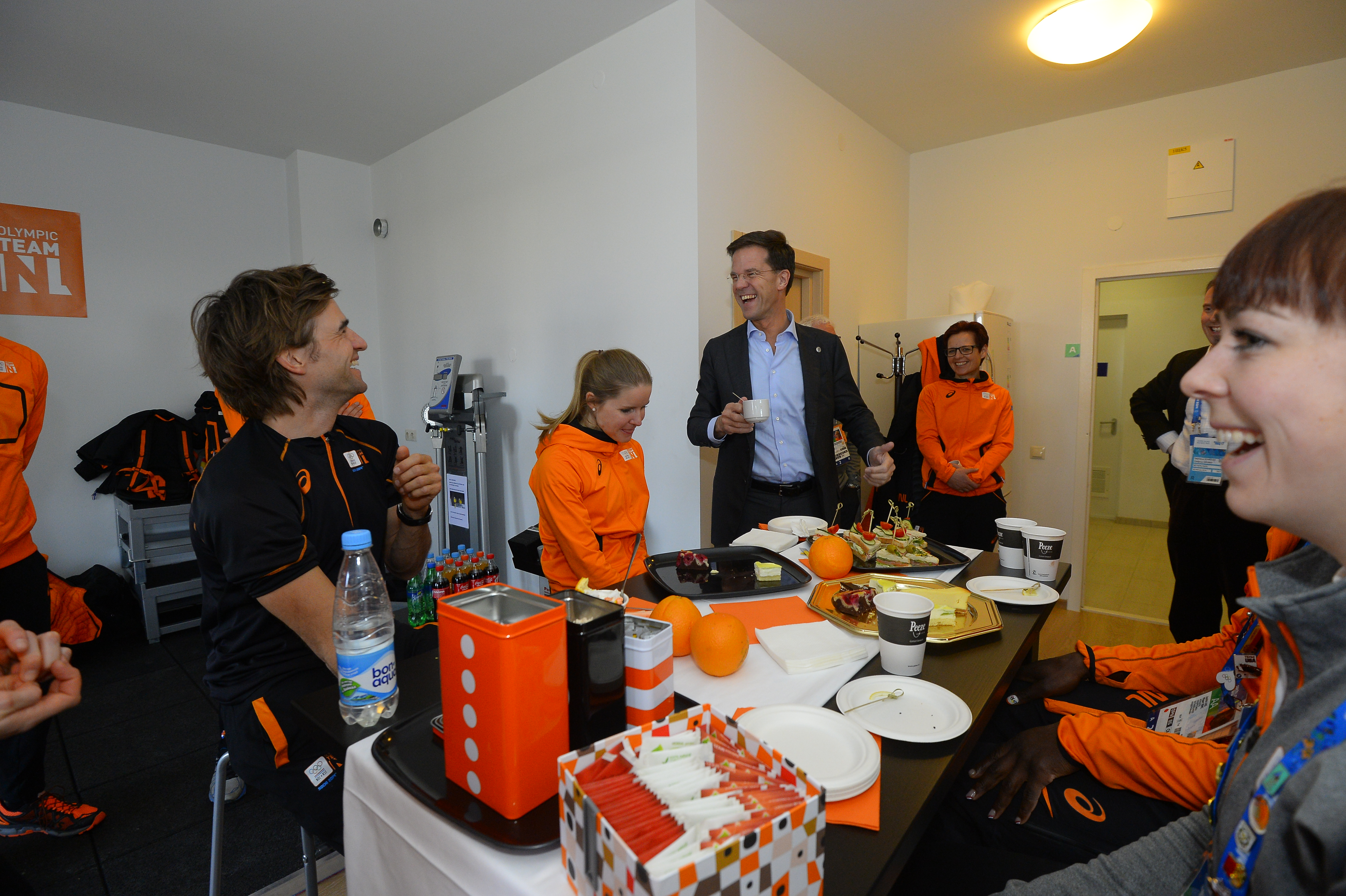
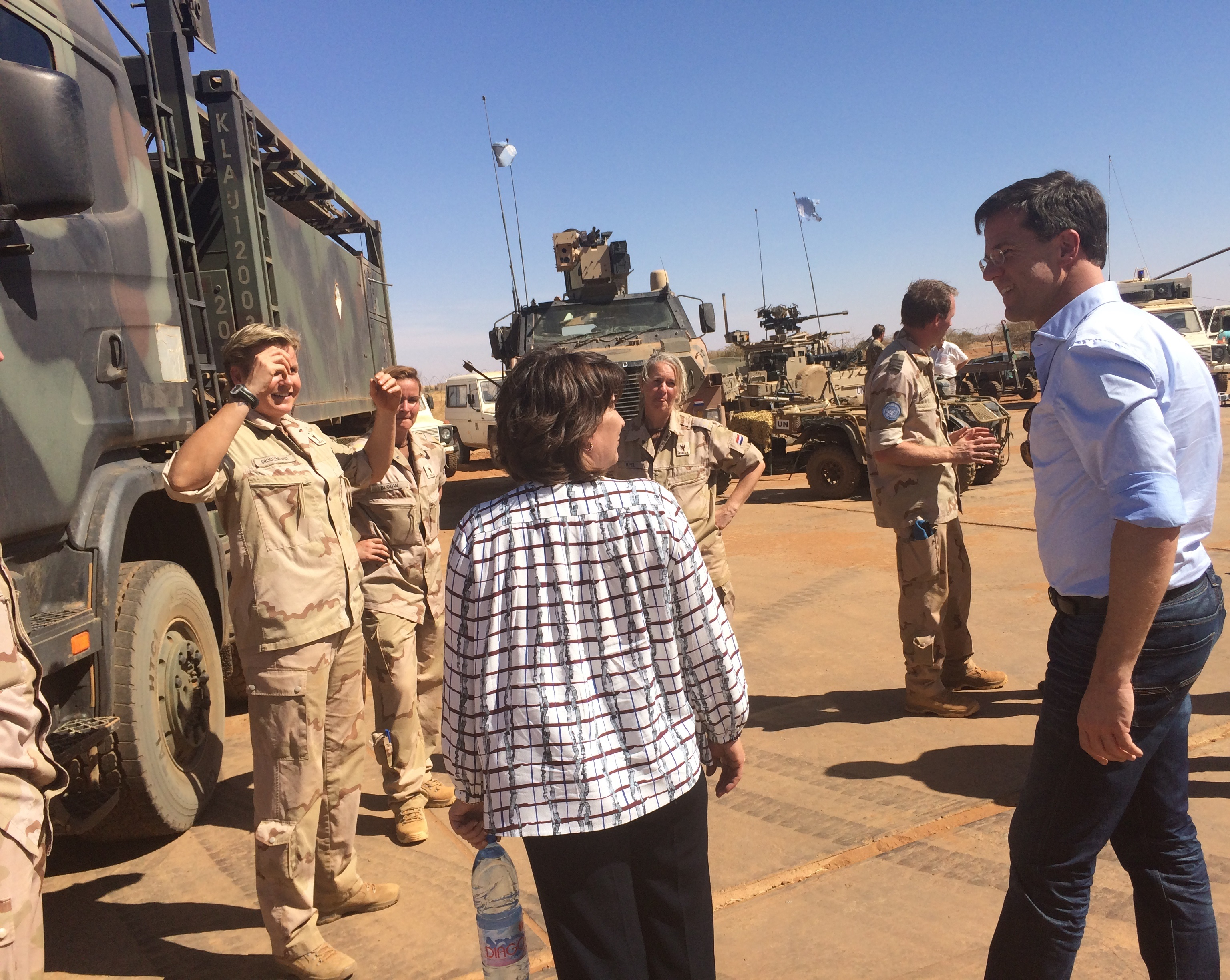
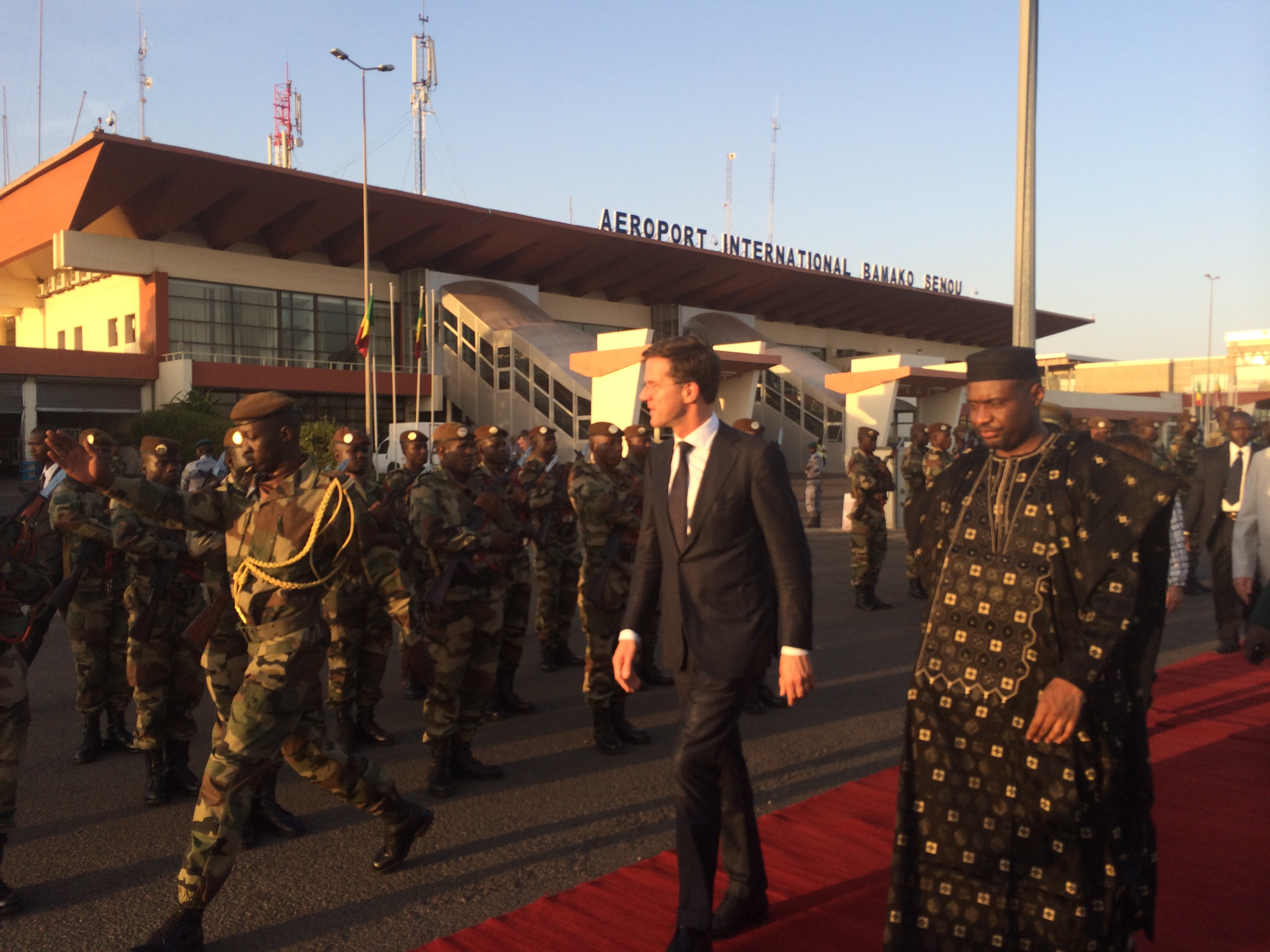
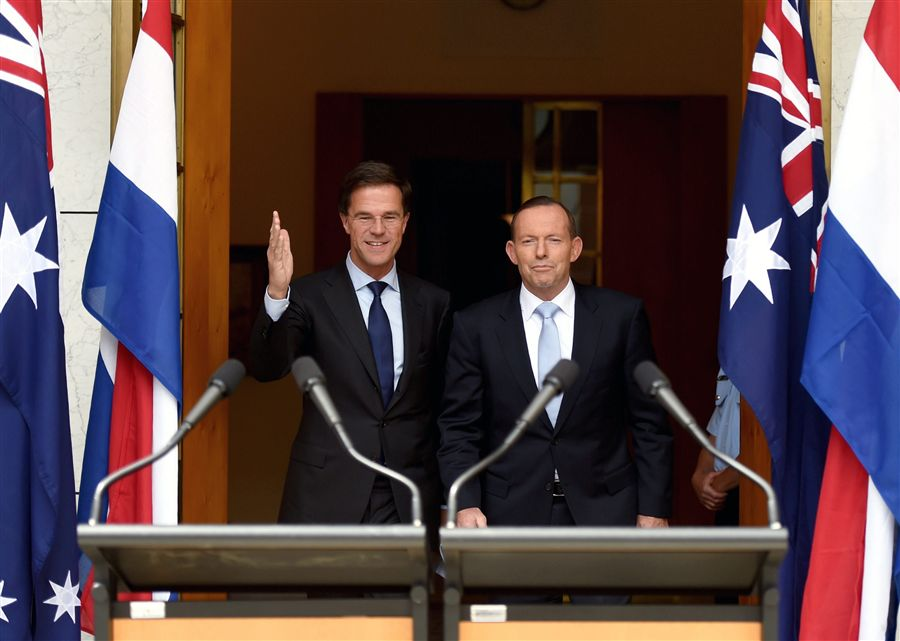
Impressions of Rutte's visits in 2014.

| Country | Areas visited | Date(s) | Details |
|---|---|---|---|
| Germany | North Rhine-Westphalia | 15 January | Rutte met PM Hannelore Kraft. |
| Switzerland | Davos | 22-23 January | Rutte attended the World Economic Forum. |
| Russia | Sochi | 7-8 February | Rutte visited the Winter Olympics. |
| Belgium | Brussels | 13 February | Rutte met with his Benelux counterparts. |
| Belgium | Brussels | 20-21 March | Rutte attended the European Council meeting. |
| Belgium | Brussels | 27-28 May | Rutte attended the European Council meeting. |
| France | Arromanches | 6 June | Rutte commemorated the soldiers that sacrificed their lives during D-Day. |
| Germany | Hanover | 6-7 June | Rutte visited the Hannover Messe together with Chancellor Angela Merkel. |
| Sweden | Harpsund | 9-10 June | Rutte met with Chancellor Angela Merkel, PM David Cameron and PM Reinfeldt. |
| Ireland | Dublin | 10 June | Rutte visited PM Enda Kenny. |
| Vietnam | Hanoi | 15-17 June | Rutte visited PM Nguyễn Tấn Dũng and was part of a trade mission. |
| Belgium | Brussels | 26-27 June | Rutte attended the European Council meeting. |
| Belgium | Brussels | 16-17 July | Rutte attended the European Council meeting. |
| Belgium | Brussels | 30-31 August | Rutte attended the European Council meeting. |
| United Kingdom | Newport, Wales | 4-5 September | Rutte attended the NATO 2014 Wales summit. |
| United States | New York City | 23-27 September | Rutte attended the UN Climate Summit, United Nations General Assembly and the United Nations Security Council meeting. |
| Italy | Milan | 16 October | Rutte attended the Asia–Europe Meeting and met with President Vladimir Putin. |
| Belgium | Brussels | 23-24 October | Rutte attended the European Council meeting. |
| Malaysia | Kuala Lumpur | 4-5 November | Rutte met with PM Najib Razak to talk about MH17. |
| Australia | Canberra | 6-7 November | Rutte met with PM Tony Abbott to talk about MH17. |
| Mali | Gao | 8 December | Rutte visited the Dutch military that contributes to a UN peacekeeping mission. |
| Belgium | Brussels | 18-19 December | Rutte attended the European Council meeting. |

== 2015 ==
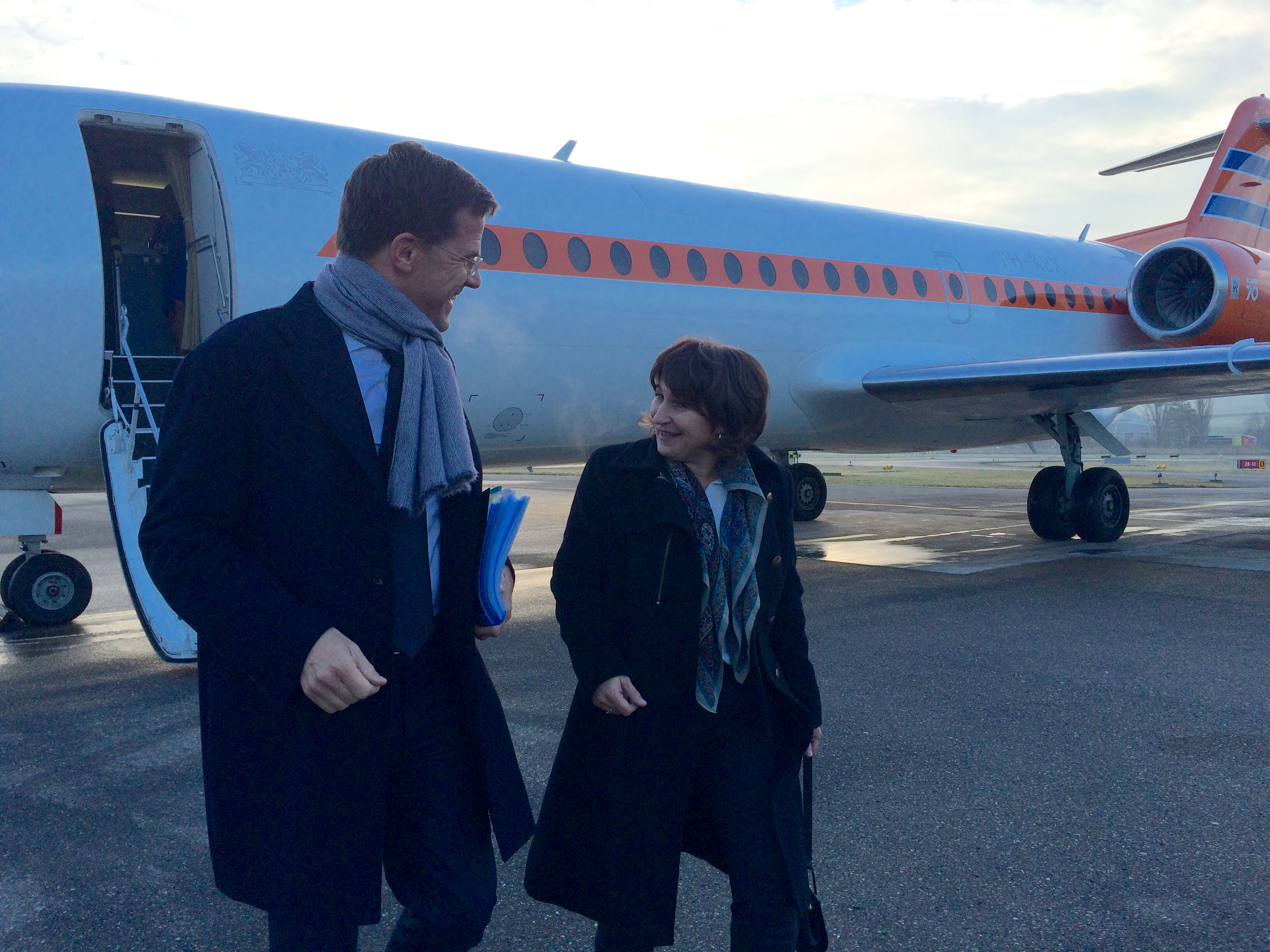
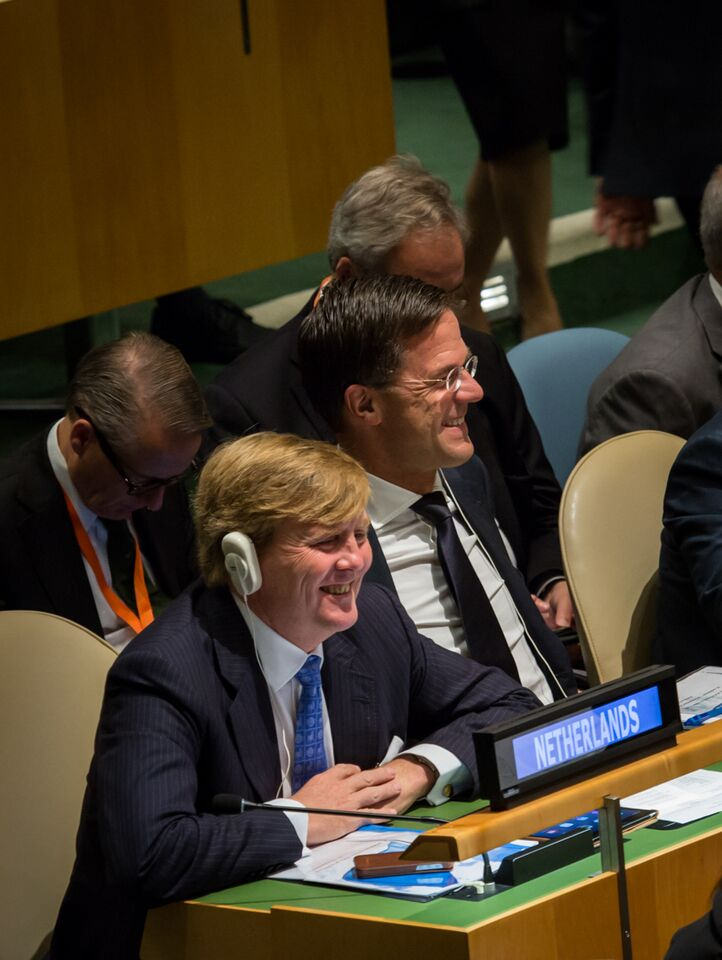
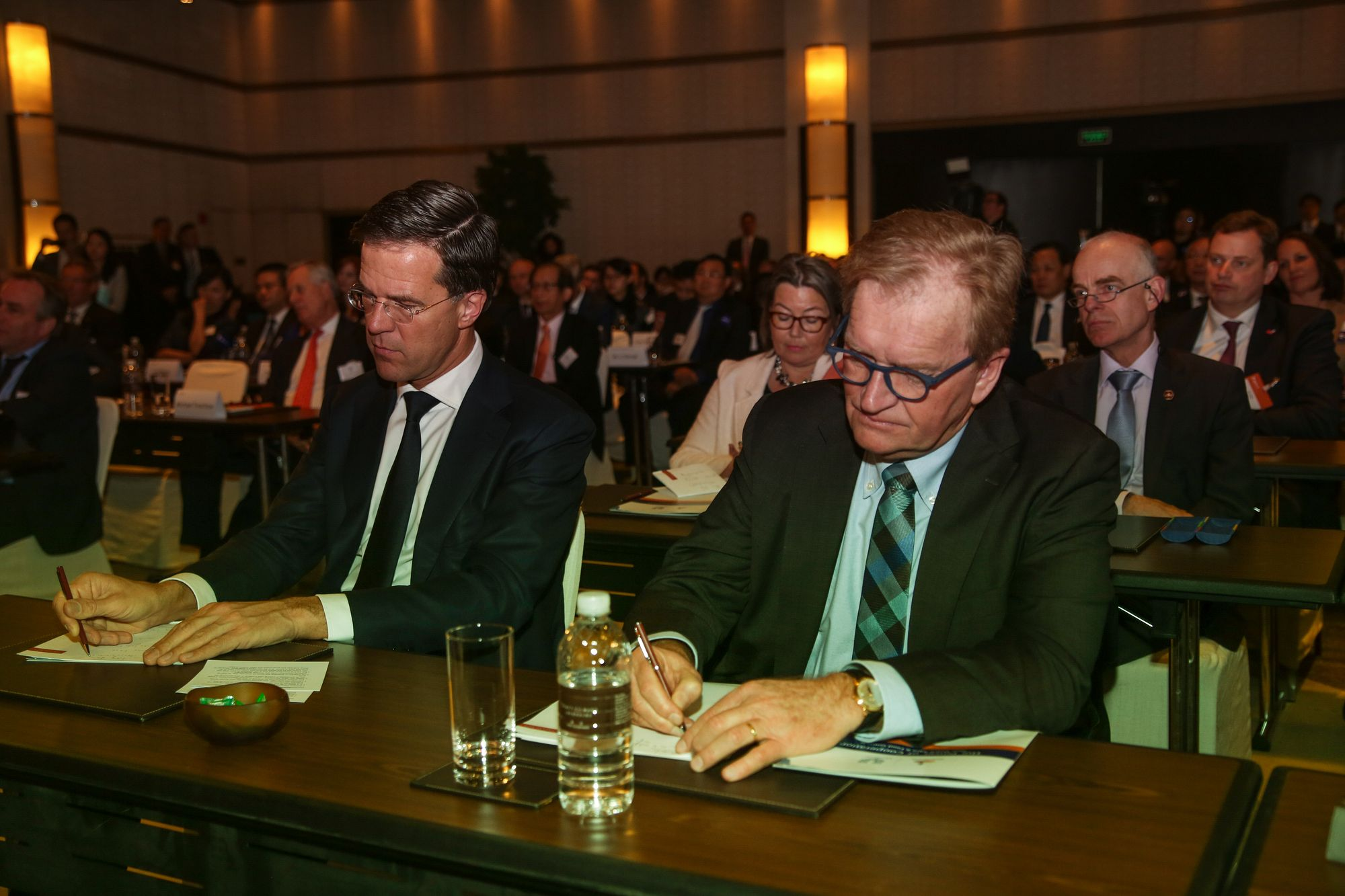
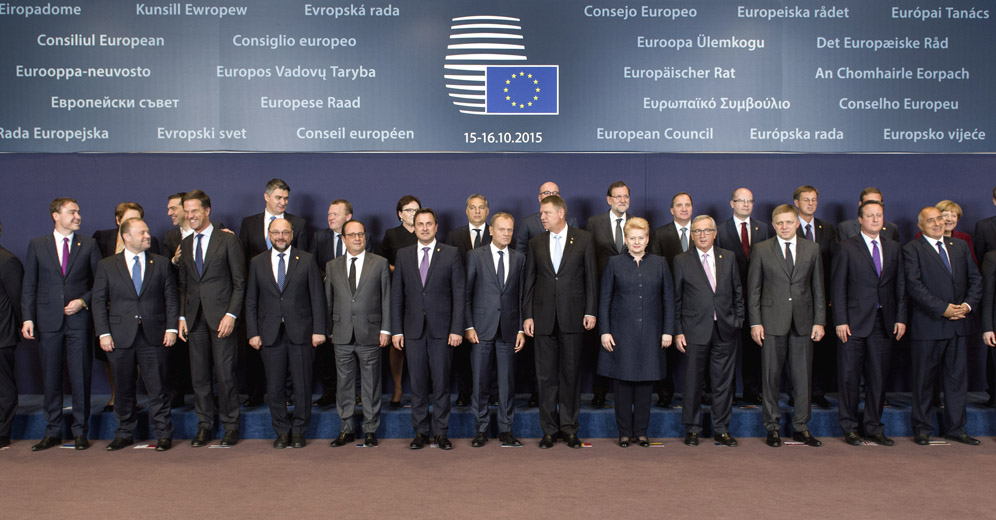
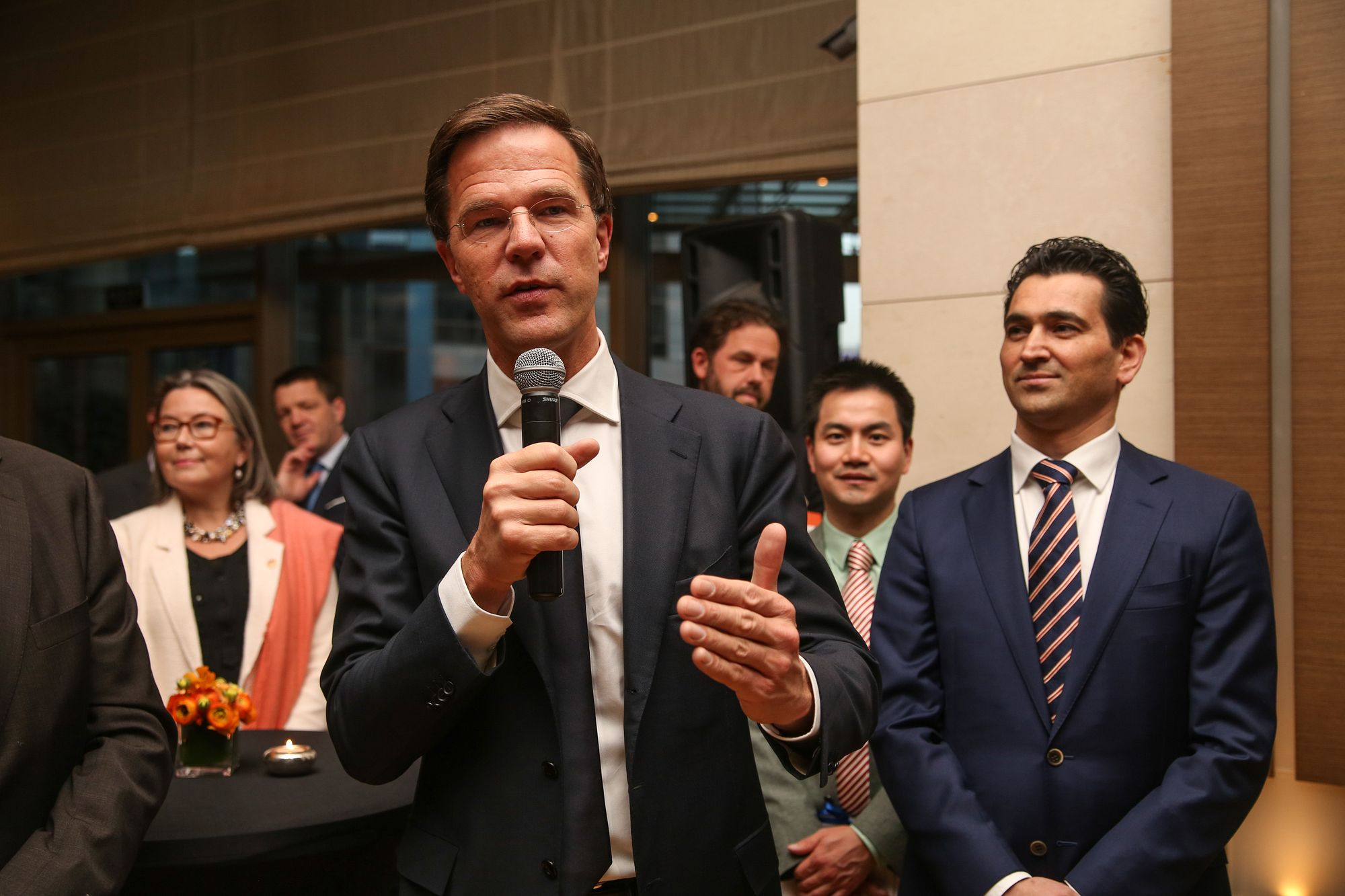
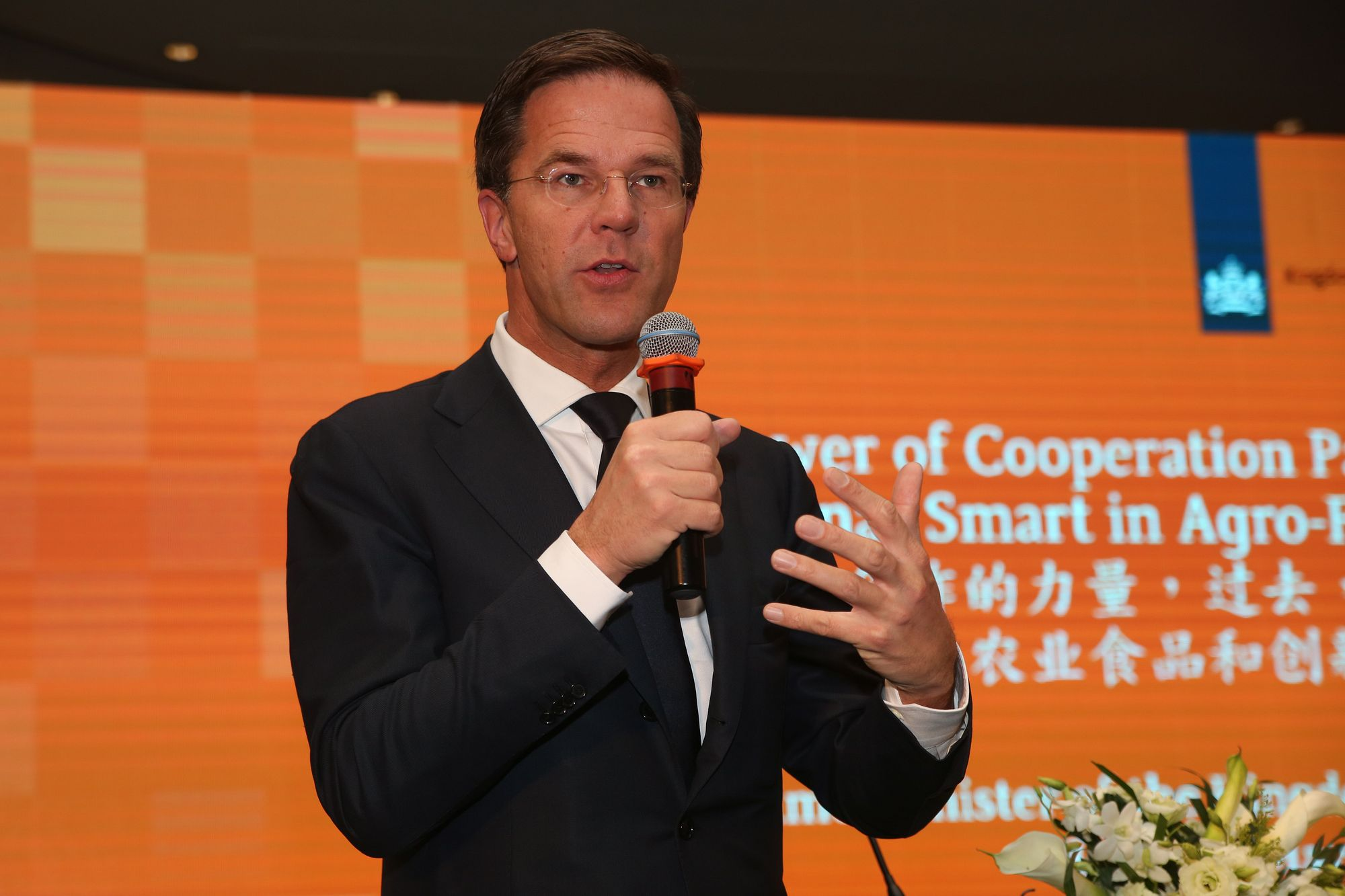
Impressions of Rutte's visits in 2015.

| Country | Areas visited | Date(s) | Details |
|---|---|---|---|
| Switzerland | Davos | 21 January | Rutte attended the World Economic Forum. |
| Poland | Oświęcim | 27 January | Rutte commemorated the victims that died in Nazi concentration camp Auschwitz together with the King Willem-Alexander and Queen Máxima of the Netherlands. |
| Belgium | Brussels | 11-12 February | Rutte attended the European Council meeting. |
| Belgium | Brussels | 19-20 March | Rutte attended the European Council meeting. |
| China | Boao, Shenzhen | 25-29 March | Rutte was part of a trade mission, and attended the Boao Forum. |
| Panama | Panama City | 10-13 April | Rutte attended the 7th Summit of the Americas and was part of a trade mission. |
| Belgium | Brussels | 23 April | Rutte attended the European Council meeting. |
| Belgium | Brussels | 29 April | Rutte met with his counterparts from the Benelux. |
| Belgium | Brussels | 7 May | Rutte met with President of the European Council Donald Tusk, President of the European Commission Jean-Claude Juncker and President of the European Parliament Martin Schulz. |
| France | Paris | 3 June | Rutte visited the OECD and met with President François Hollande. |
| India | New Delhi, Mumbai | 4-6 June | Rutte was part of a trade mission. |
| Belgium | Brussels | 10 June | Rutte attended the EU-CELAC meeting. |
| Belgium | Brussels | 25-26 June | Rutte attended the European Council meeting. |
| Belgium | Brussels | 7-8 July | Rutte attended the Euro summit. |
| Belgium | Brussels | 12-13 July | Rutte attended the Euro summit. |
| Luxembourg | Luxembourg | 8-9 September | Rutte met with PM Xavier Bettel and Henri, Grand Duke of Luxembourg. |
| Belgium | Brussels | 23-24 September | Rutte attended the European Council Meeting. |
| United States | New York City | 25-30 September | Rutte attended the United Nations General Assembly where he met with Bono, Mahmoud Abbas and Ban Ki-moon. And he was part of a Dutch trade mission. |
| United States | Atlanta | 5-7 October | Rutte commemorated the soldiers that fought during World War II, and visited Dutch companies as part of a trade mission. |
| Belgium | Brussels | 15-16 October | Rutte addressed the Flemish parliament, and attended the European Council meeting. |
| Bangladesh | Dhaka | 4 November | Rutte visited Prime Minister Sheikh Hasina to talk about collaboration in the field of water management, harbour development and agriculture. |
| Japan | Tokyo | 8-10 November | Rutte visited Prime Minister Shinzo Abe and Dutch businesses in Japan as part of a trade mission. |
| Malta | Valletta | 11-12 November | Rutte attended the Valletta Summit on Migration. |
| South Africa | Cape Town | 17 November | Rutte met with President Jacob Zuma. |
| France | Paris | 30 November | Rutte attended the 2015 United Nations Climate Change Conference. |
| Kazakhstan | Astana | 2 December | Rutte meets with the president of Kazakhstan Nursultan Nazarbayev. |
| Belgium | Brussels | 10 December | Rutte met with Jean-Claude Juncker and Frans Timmermans. |
| Belgium | Brussels | 18 December | Rutte attended the European Council meeting. |

== 2016 ==
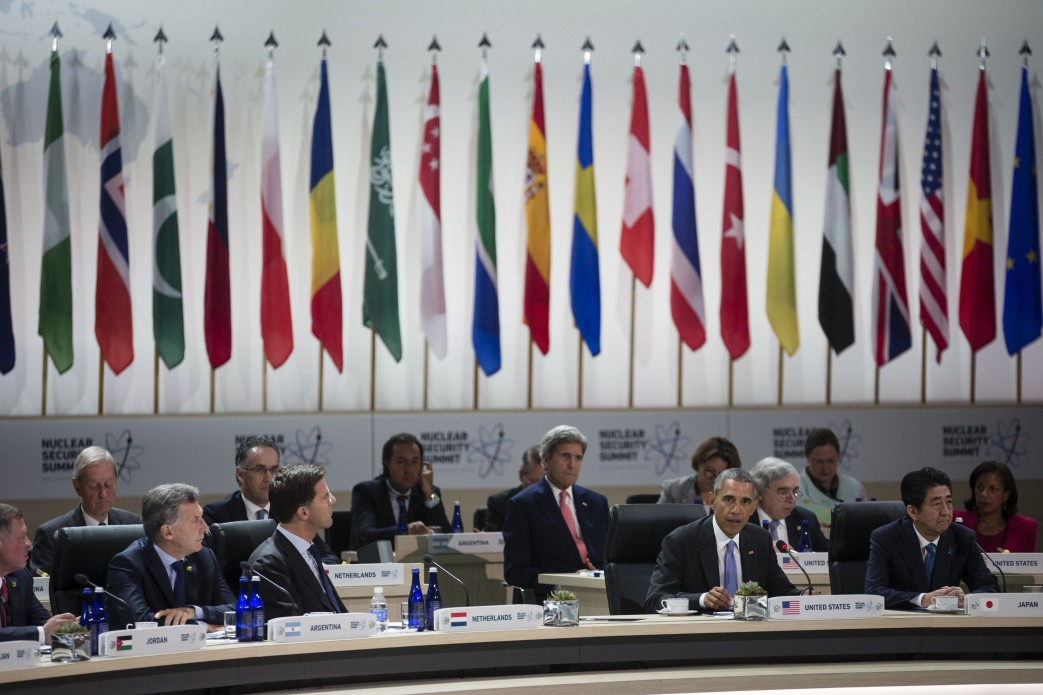
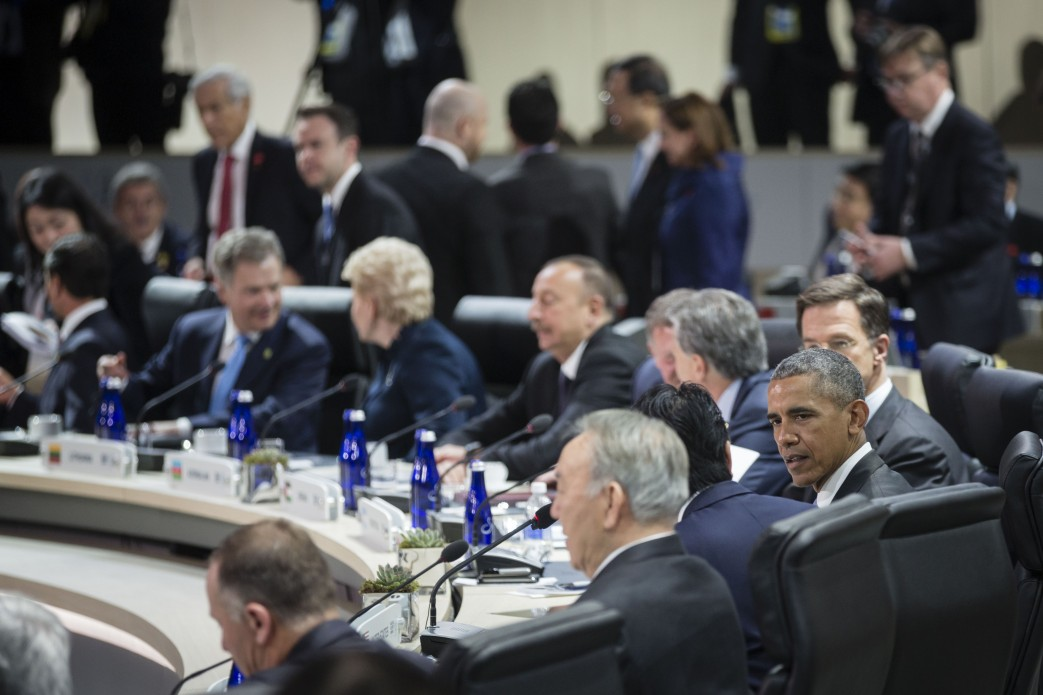
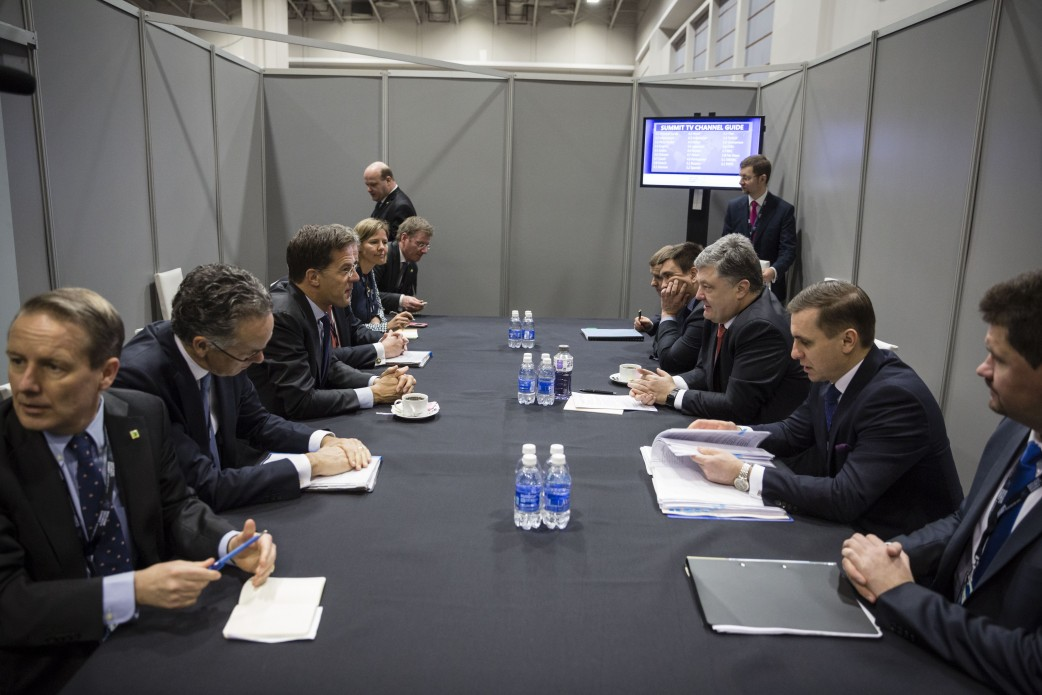
Impressions of Rutte's visit to the Nuclear Security Summit in Washington (2016).
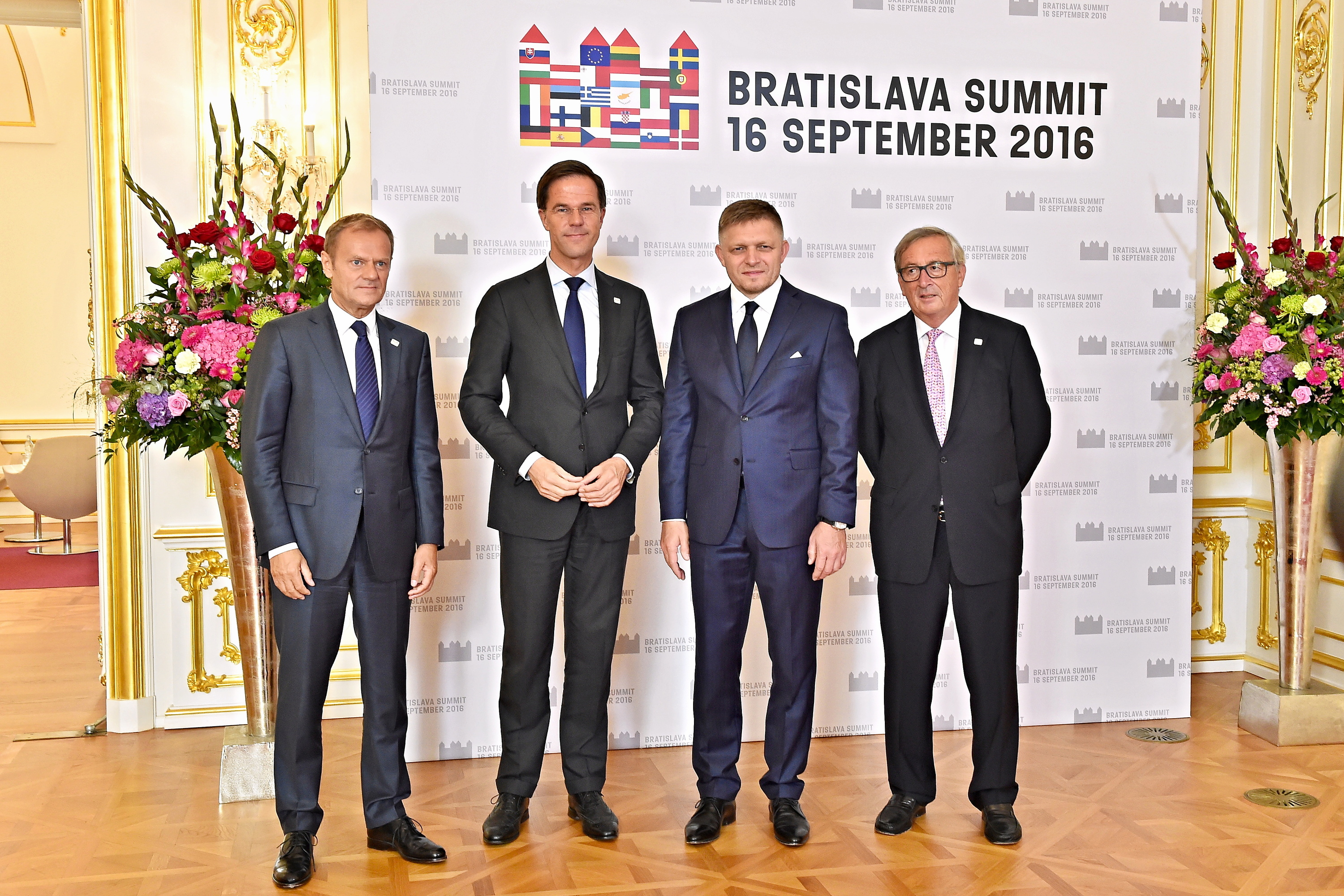
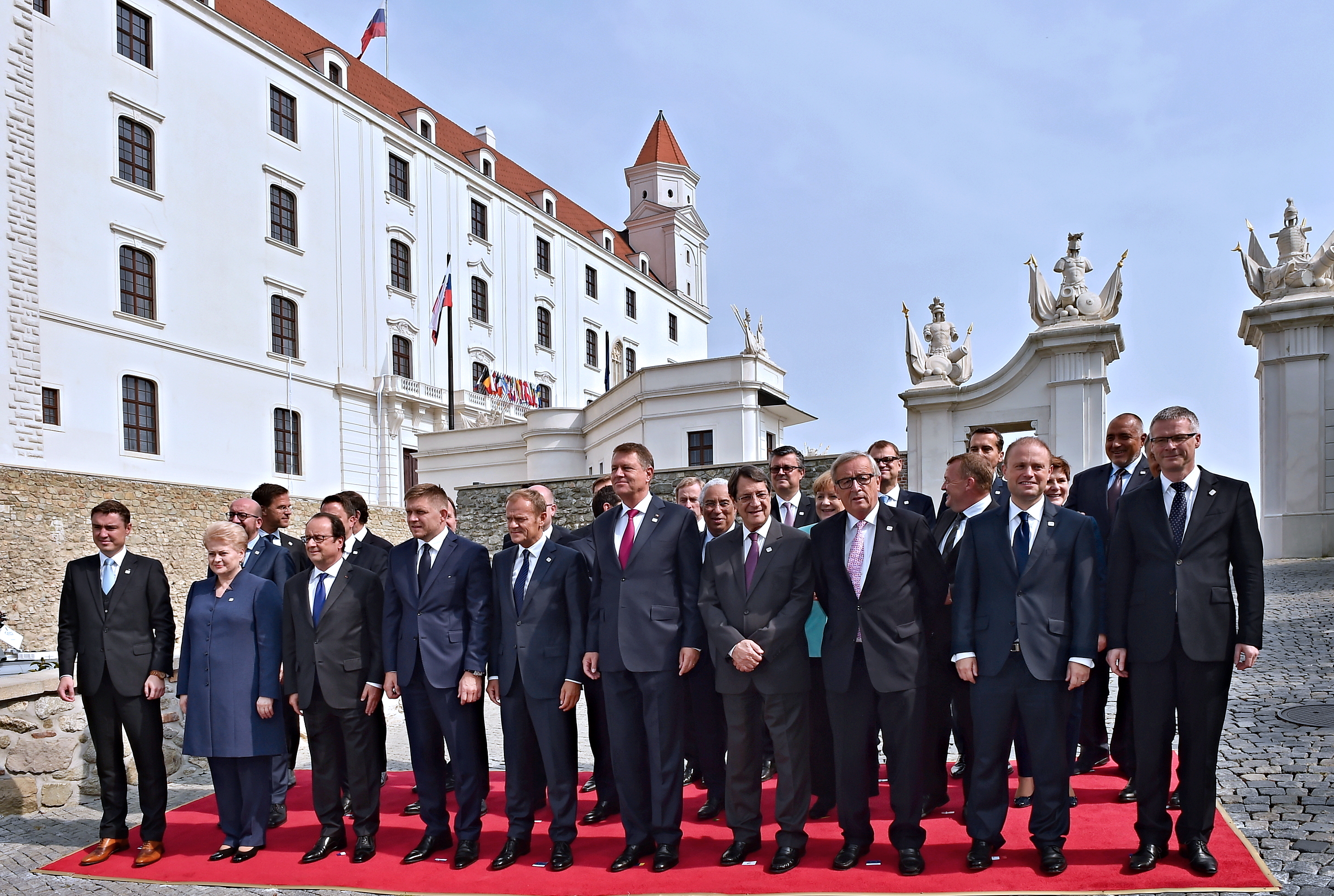
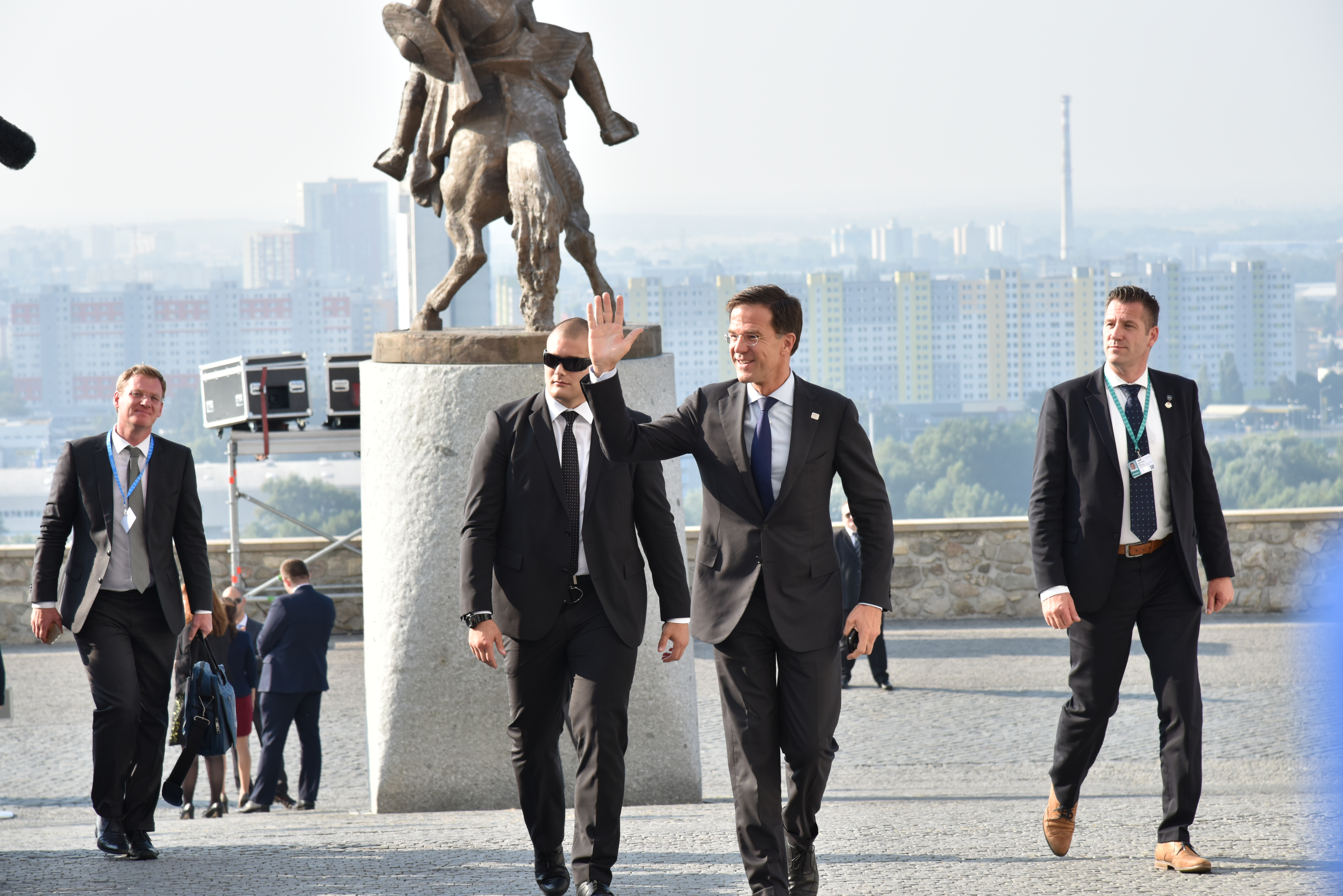
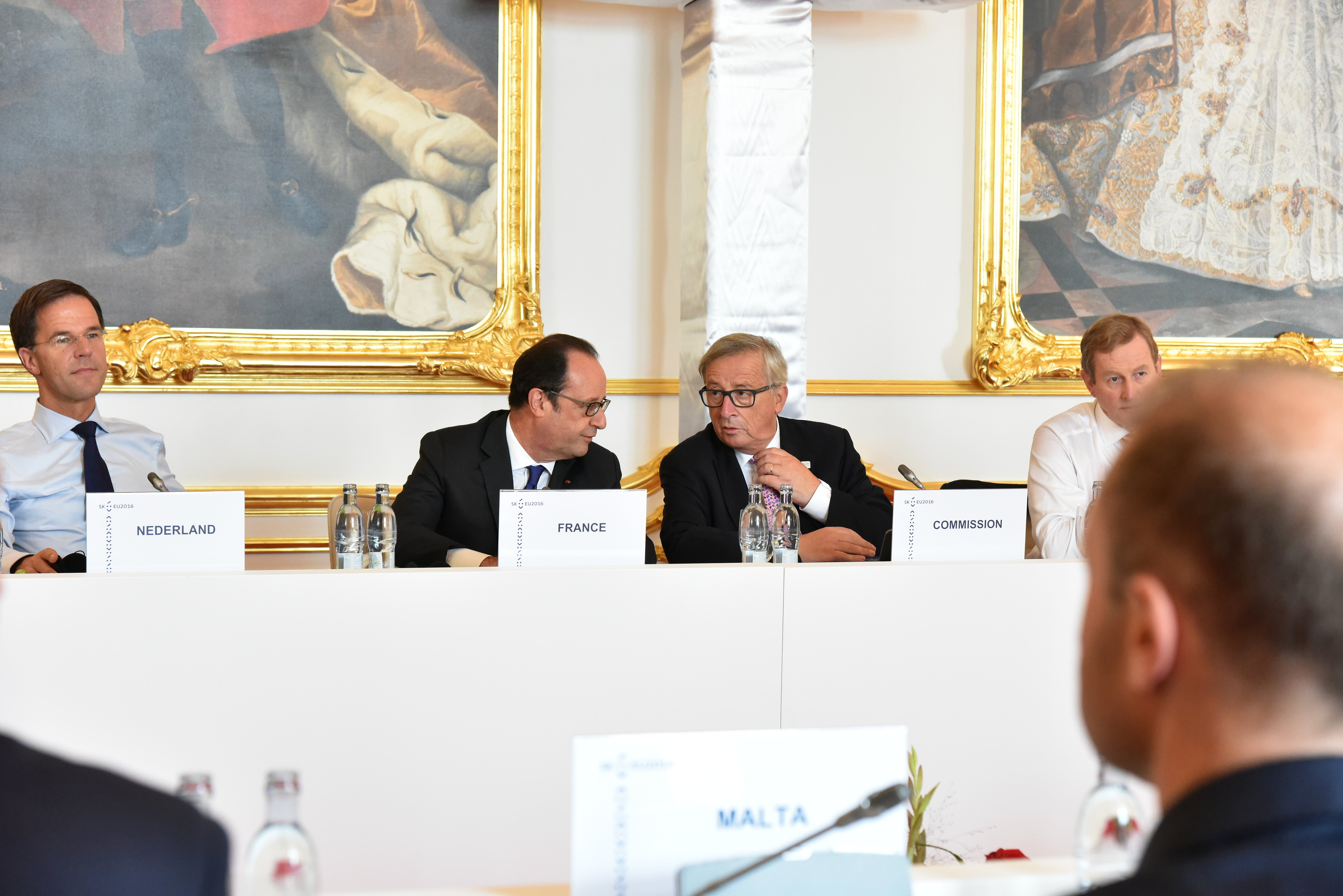
Impressions of Rutte's visit to the Bratislava Summit in 2016.

| Country | Areas visited | Date(s) | Details |
|---|---|---|---|
| France | Strasbourg | 20 January | Rutte spoke for the European Parliament. |
| Switzerland | Davos | 20-21 January | Rutte attended the World Economic Forum, and met with Israeli prime minister Benjamin Netanyahu, Turkish prime minister Ahmet Davutoglu and British prime minister David Cameron. |
| United States | San Francisco | 1-2 February | Rutte visited Silicon Valley and accompanied the Dutch trade mission. |
| United Kingdom | London | 4 February | Rutte attended the "Supporting Syria & the Region" Summit and met with his European and Middle Eastern counterparts. |
| France | Paris | 12 February | Rutte met with French president François Hollande. |
| Belgium | Brussels | 16-20 February | Rutte attended the European Council meeting and preparatory meetings with his counterparts. |
| Belgium | Brussels | 17-18 March | Rutte attended the European Council meeting. |
| United States | Washington, D.C. | 1 April | Rutte attended the Nuclear Security Summit. |
| Lebanon | Beirut | 3 May | Rutte met with Lebanese prime minister Tammam Salam and visited a temporary refugee camp in the region. |
| Italy | Rome | 19 May | Rutte met with Italian prime minister Matteo Renzi. |
| Belgium | Brussels | 19 May | Rutte gave a speech at the BusinessEurope Council of presidents. |
| Turkey | Istanbul | 23 May | Rutte attended the World Humanitarian Summit, and met with President Recep Tayyip Erdoğan. |
| Cuba | Havana | 4-5 June | Rutte attend the ACS Summit. |
| Vatican City | Vatican City | 15 June | Rutte met with Pope Francis. |
| Slovakia | Bratislava | 15 June | Rutte met with his Slovak and Maltese counterparts, and attended the Bratislava Summit. |
| Belgium | Brussels | 28-29 June | Rutte attended the European Council meeting. |
| France | Strasbourg | 5 July | Rutte gave a speech for the European Parliament. |
| Poland | Warsaw | 8-9 July | Rutte attended the NATO Summit. |
| Mongolia | Ulaanbaatar | 15-16 July | Rutte attended the ASEM Summit where he met with Russian prime minister Medvedev. |
| Brazil | Rio de Janeiro | 6 August | Rutte attended the opening ceremony of the Olympic Games. |
| Iraq | Erbil | 9 August | Rutte visited the Dutch military in the country. |
| Poland | Warsaw | 26 August | Rutte attended a Brexit meeting with his counterparts from Sweden, Denmark, Finland, Germany, Czech Republic, Hungary, Poland and Slovakia. |
| South Korea | Seoul | 26-28 September | Rutte met with President Park Geun Hye, visited the demilitarized zone and accompanied the Dutch trade mission among other things. |
| Israel | Jerusalem | 30 September | Rutte has a meeting about MH17 and the Dutch Ukraine–European Union Association Agreement referendum with Ukrainian president Poroshenko. In addition the prime minister commemorated former prime minister of Israel Shimon Peres. |
| Luxembourg | Schengen | 3 October | Rutte attends Benelux meeting. |
| Malta | Valletta | 4 November | Rutte attends European Council meeting. |
| Indonesia | Semarang, Jakarta | 22-23 November | Rutte visited water management sites that collaborate with Dutch companies and institutions, and paid a tribute to Dutch war victims at the Dutch War Cemetery Kalibanteng. Rutte spoke to the parliament of Indonesia, met with President Joko Widodo and accompanied the Dutch trade mission. |
| Singapore | Singapore | 24 November | Rutte met with Prime Minister Lee Hsien Loong, and accompanied the Dutch trade mission. |
| Tunisia | Tunis | 6 December | Rutte visits the country together with his Benelux counterparts. |

== 2017 ==
Davos 2017 – Which Europe Now

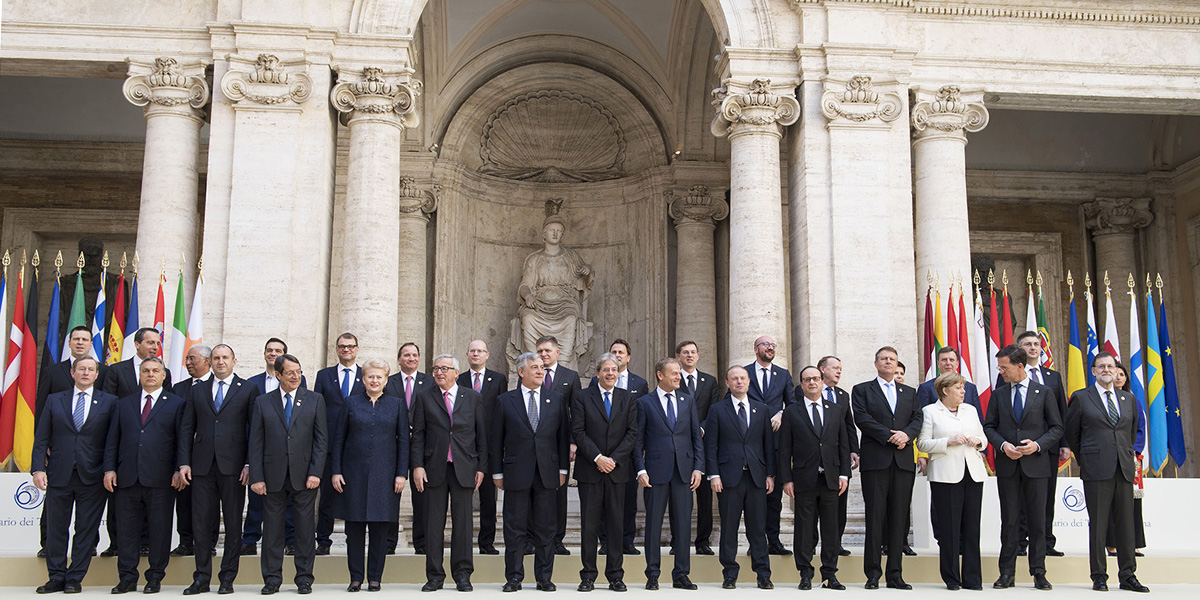
Treaty of Rome anniversary group photograph 2017-03-25 03

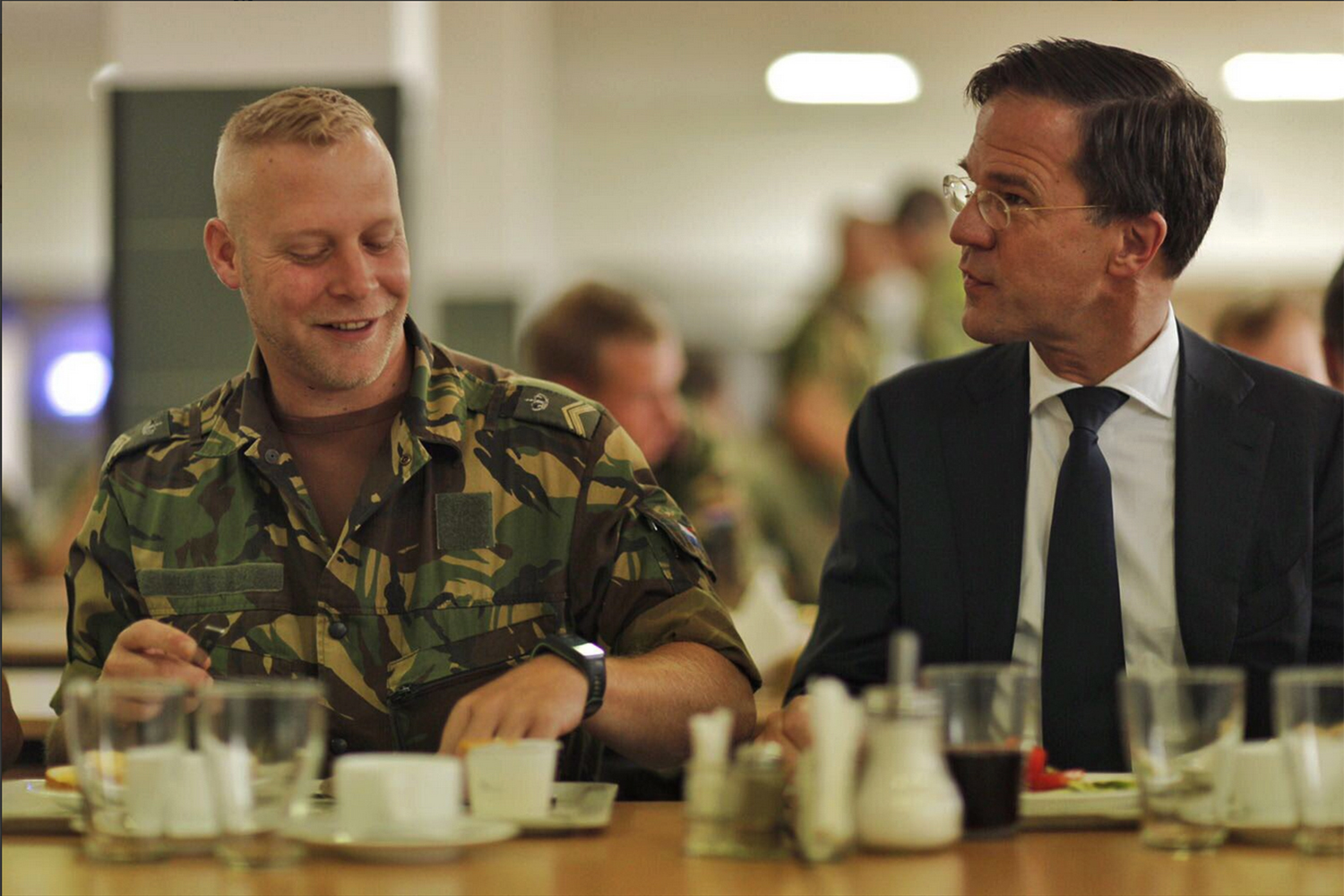
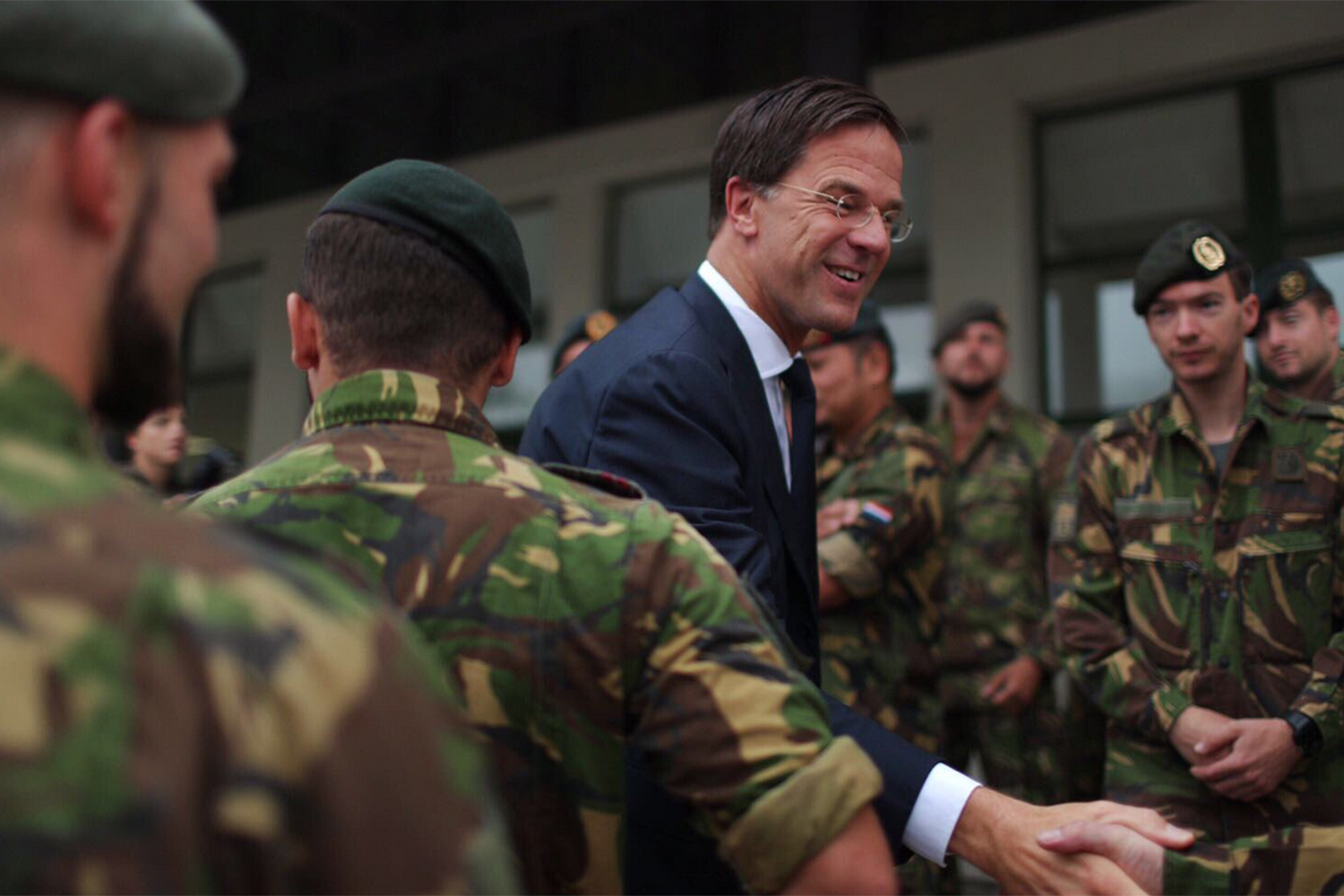
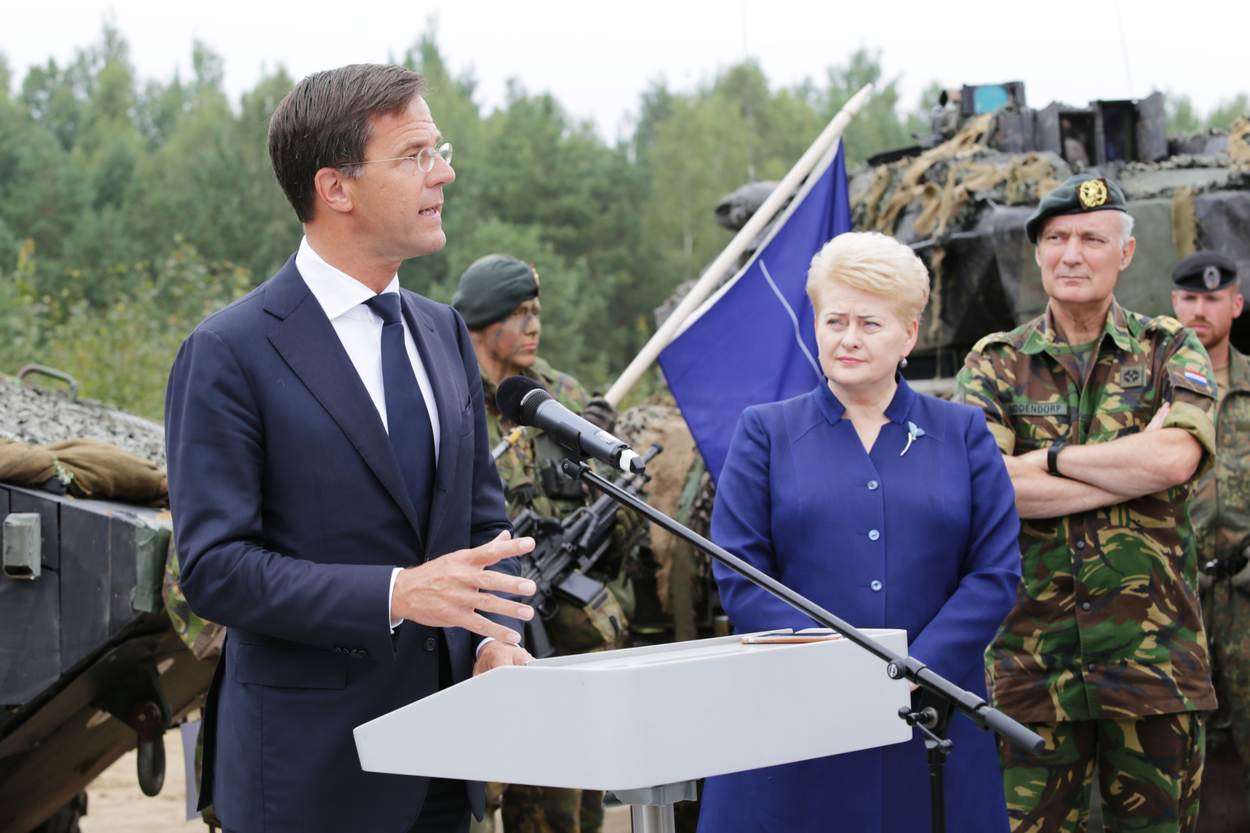
Mark Rutte visiting the Dutch Military in Rukla, Lithuania.

| Country | Areas visited | Date(s) | Details |
|---|---|---|---|
| Switzerland | Davos | 18-19 January | Rutte attended the World Economic Forum. |
| Belgium | Brussels | 9-10 March | Rutte attended the European Council Meeting. |
| Vatican City | Vatican City | 24 March | Rutte visits the Vatican with his 27 EU-counterparts. |
| Italy | Rome | 25 March | Rutte attends the Rome Treaty celebration. |
| Belgium | Brussels | 29 April | Rutte attended the European Council Meeting. |
| Belgium | Brussels | 25 May | Rutte attended the NATO Summit to discuss counter-terrorism and burden sharing. |
| France | Paris | 16 June | Rutte met with French president Emmanuel Macron. |
| Poland | Warsaw | 19 June | Rutte met with his Benelux and Visegrad counterparts. |
| Belgium | Brussels | 22-23 June | Rutte attended the European Council meeting. |
| Germany | Berlin | 29 June | Rutte met with Chancellor Angela Merkel. |
| Germany | Hamburg | 7-8 July | Rutte attended the G20, and met with Angela Merkel and Lee Hsien Loong. |
| Lithuania | Rukla | 10-11 August | Rutte visited the Dutch military that takes part in a NATO mission. |
| France | Paris | 31 August | Rutte met with President Emmanuel Macron. |
| United States | New York City | 20-21 September | Rutte spoke at the Bloomberg Global Business Forum and the UN General Assembly, and attended the UN Security Council. |
| Estonia | Tallinn | 28-29 September | Rutte attended the Tallinn Digital Summit. |
| Belgium | Brussels | 4 October | Rutte met with President of the European Commission Donald Tusk. |
| Belgium | Brussels | 19-20 October | Rutte attended the European Council meeting. |
| Sweden | Gothenburg | 17 November | Rutte attended the Social Summit for Fair Jobs and Growth. |
| Mali | Bamako, Gao | 28-29 November | Rutte met with the Malinese president Keïta together with his Belgian and Luxembourgish counterparts. Rutte visited the Dutch military. |
| Ivory Coast | Abidjan | 29 November | Rutte accompanied a Dutch trade mission to the country, and attended the EU-Africa Summit. |
| Ghana | Accra | 30 November | Rutte accompanied a Dutch trade mission to the country. |
| Ireland | Dublin | 6 December | Rutte visited Prime Minister Leo Varadkar. |
| France | Paris | 12 December | Rutte attended the European Council meeting. |
| Belgium | Brussels | 14-15 December | Rutte attended the European Council meeting. |

== 2018 ==
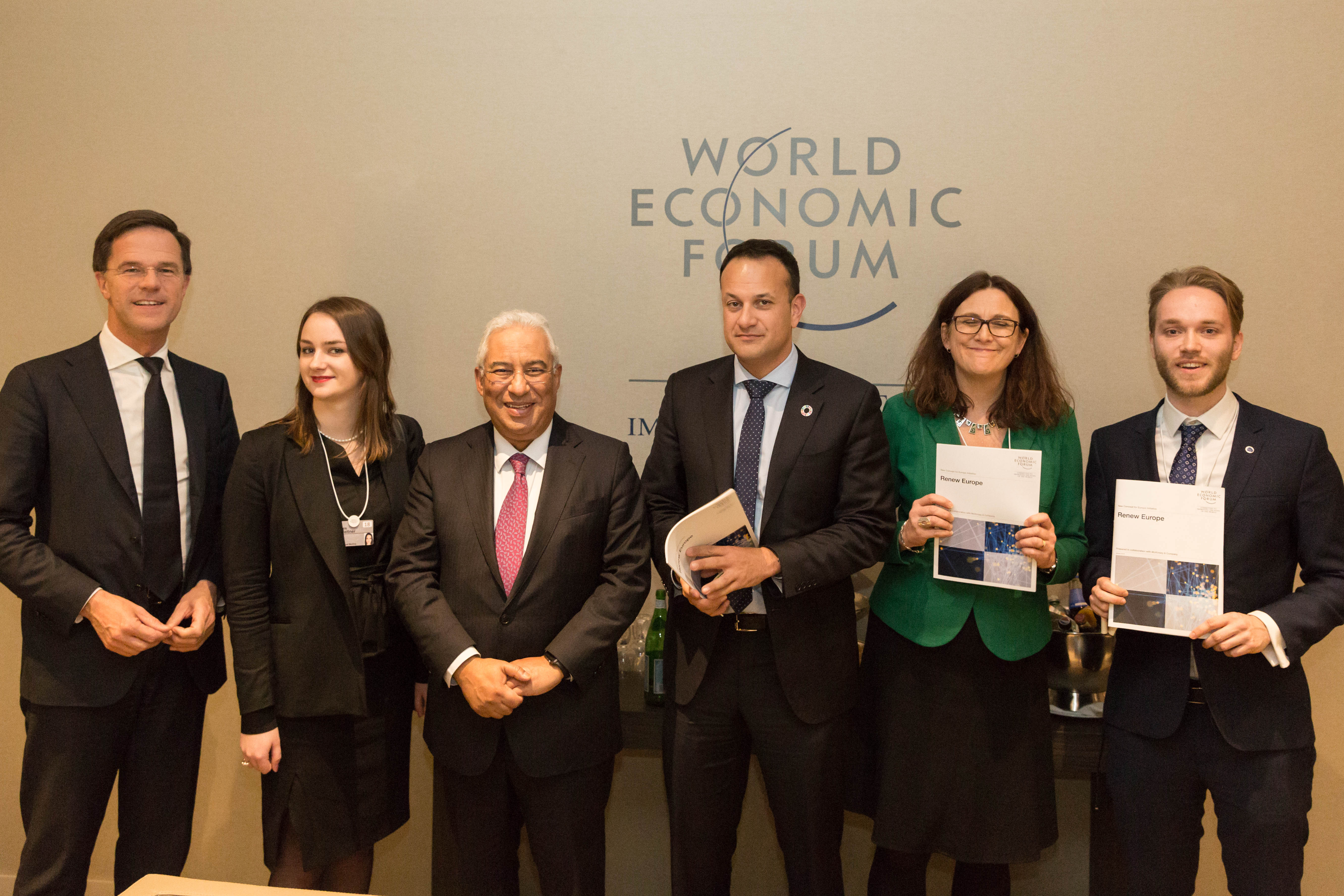
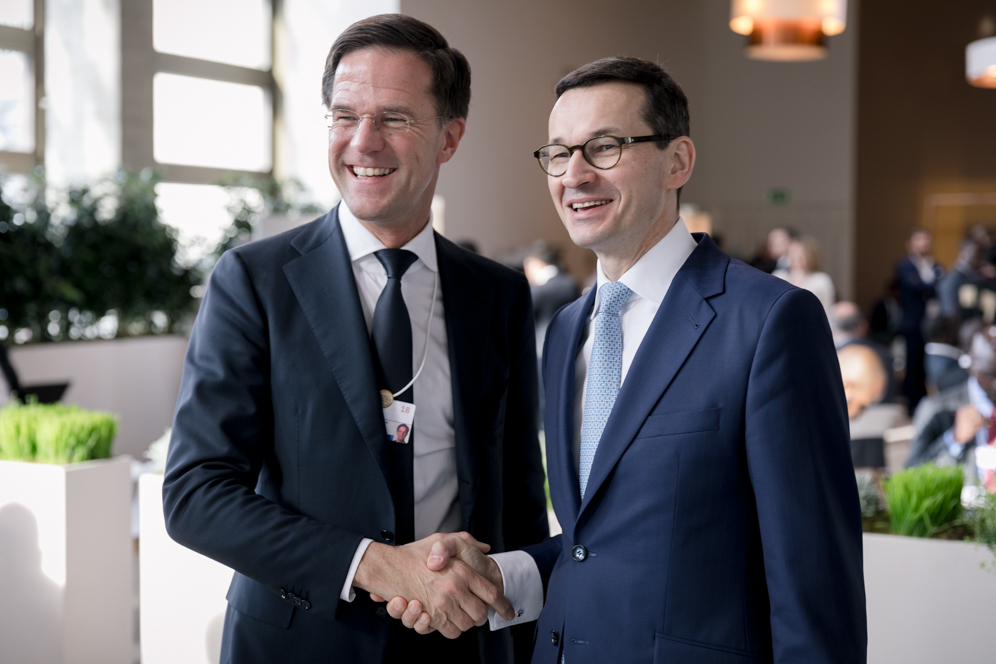
Global Shapers Agnes Aistleitner and Simon Engelke Receive Top Honors for their Contributions to the Report Renew Europe; Polish prime minister Mateusz Morawiecki and Mark Rutte shake hands at the 2018 World Economic Forum in Davos, Switzerland.

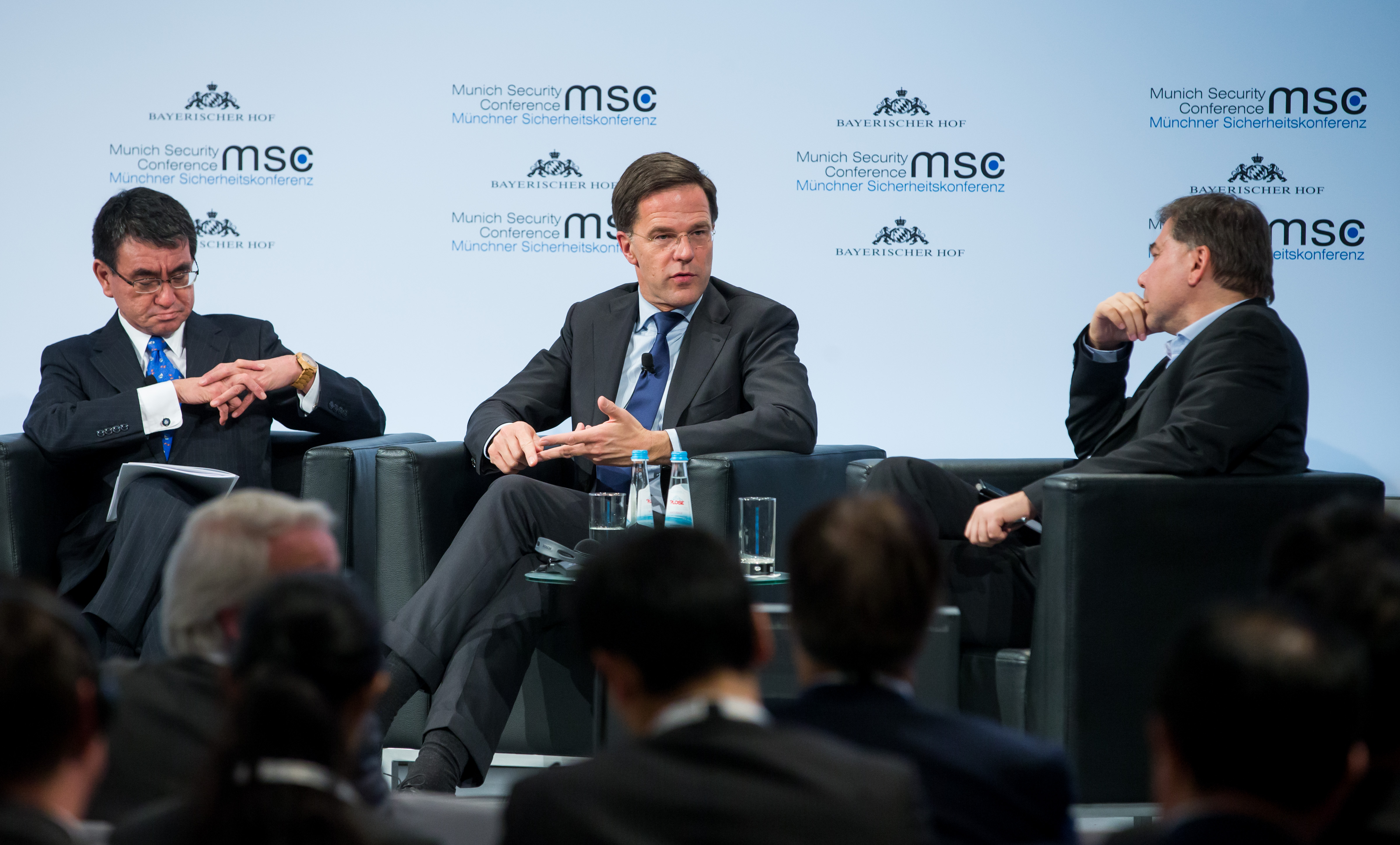
Tarō Kōno, Mark Rutte and Ivan Krastev at the Munich Security Conference.

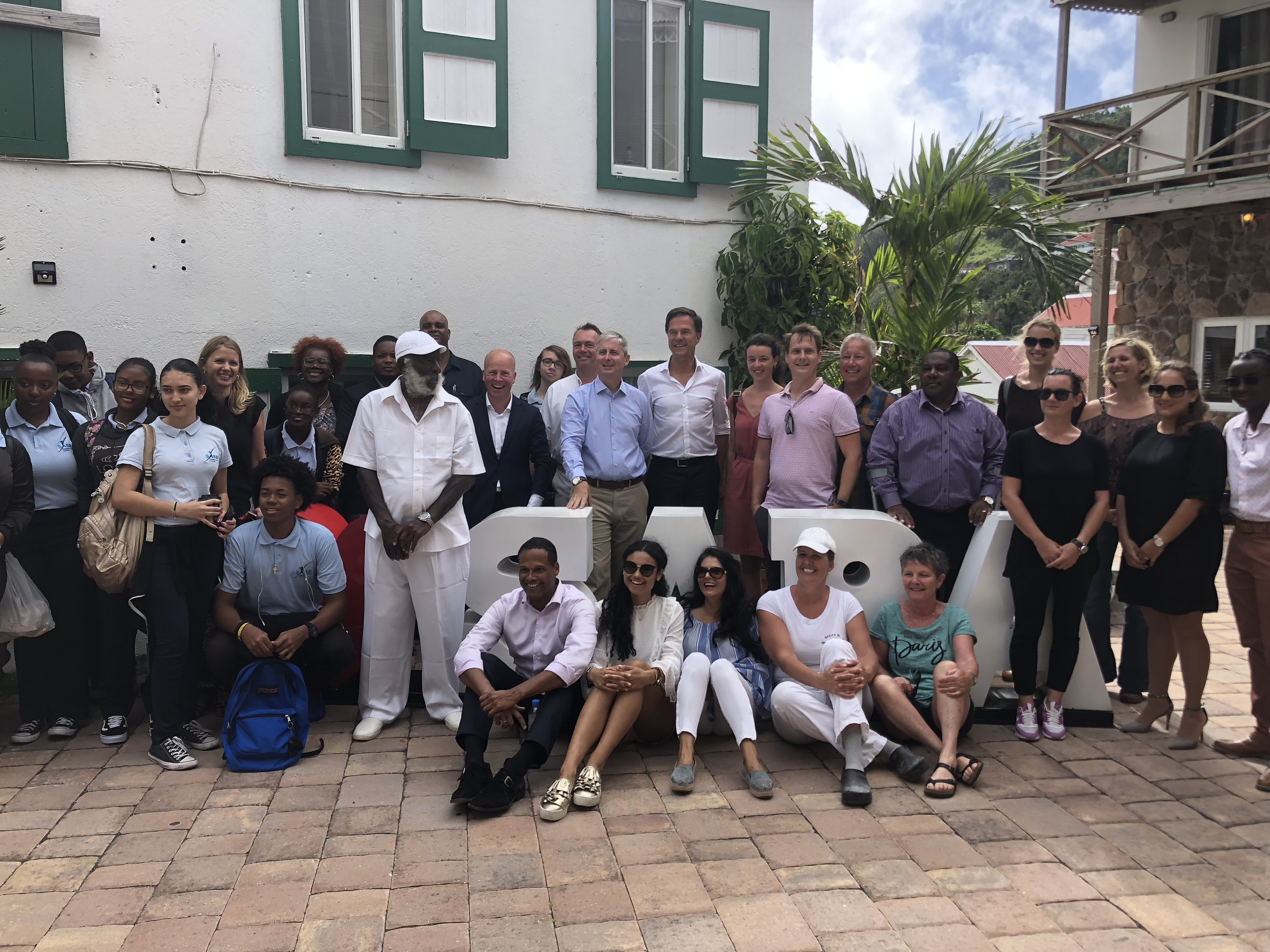
Group Photo of Mark Rutte on Saba.

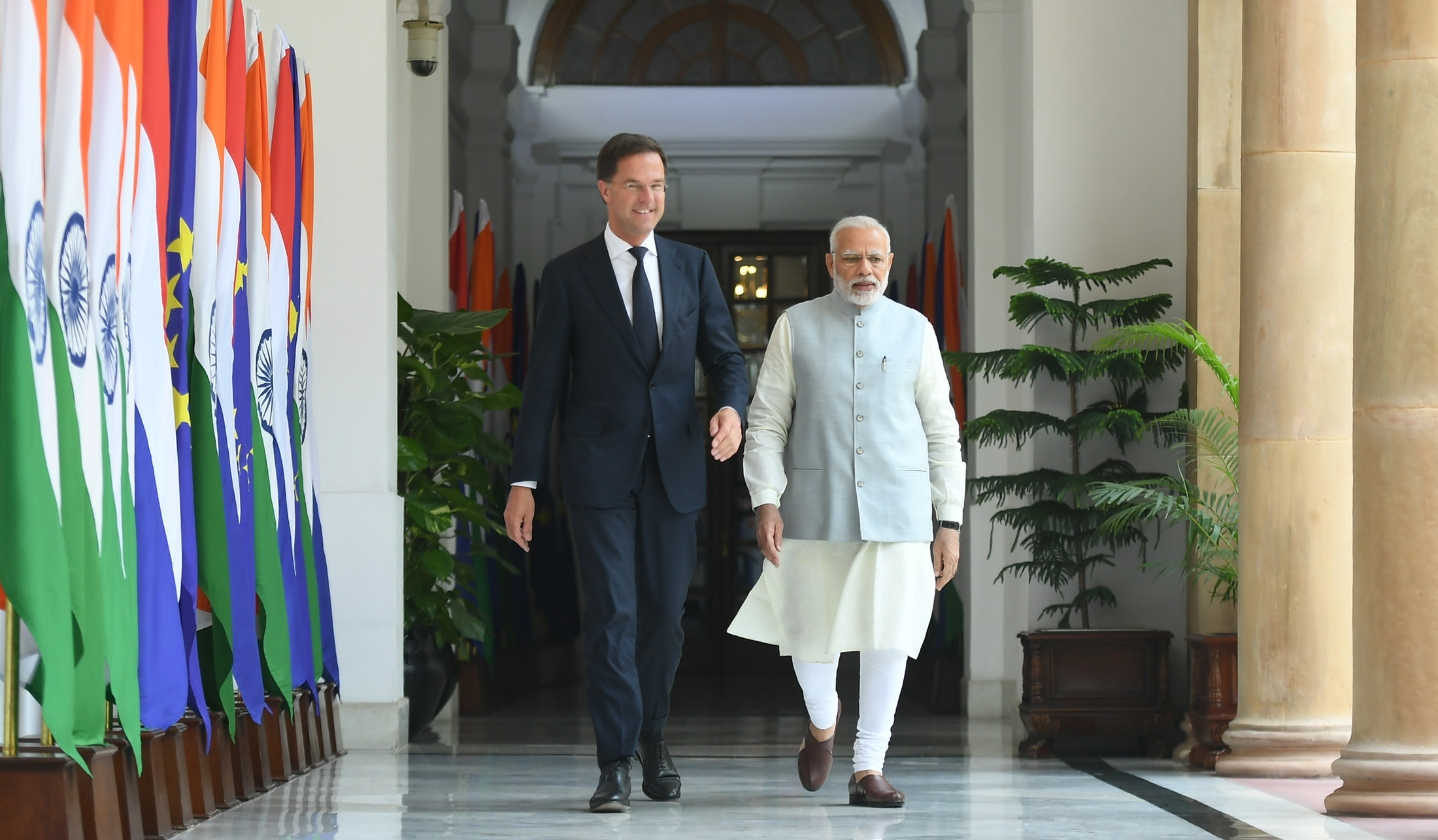
The Prime Minister, Shri Narendra Modi with the Prime Minister of the Kingdom of Netherlands, Mr. Mark Rutte, at Hyderabad House, in New Delhi on 24 May 2018.

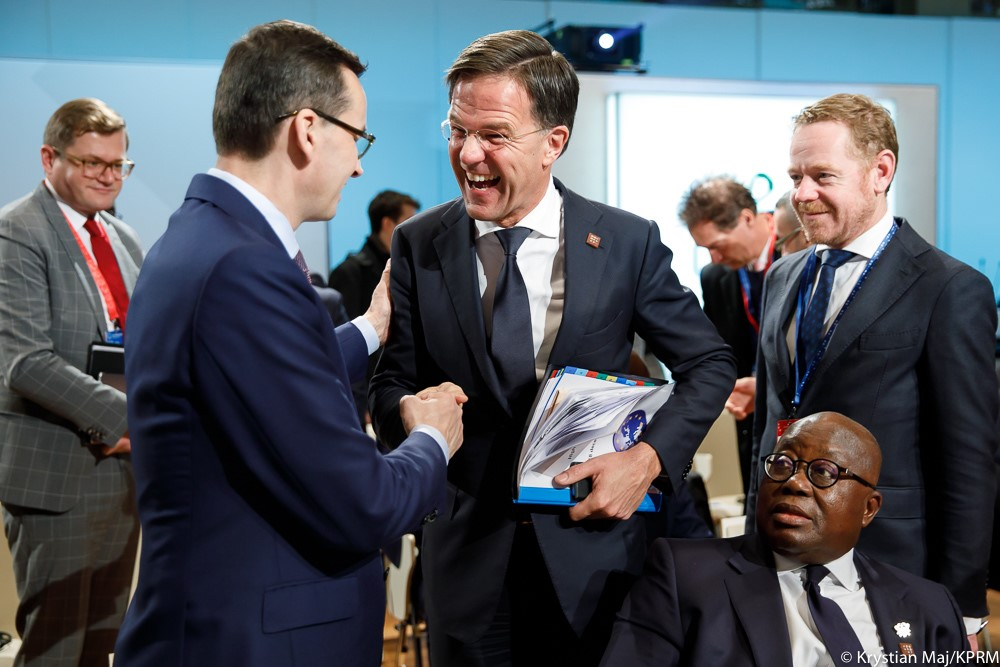
Mateusz Morawiecki and Mark Rutte encounter at the EU-Afrika Forum.

PM Trudeau and PM Rutte of the Netherlands hold a joint media availability.

| Country | Areas visited | Date(s) | Details |
|---|---|---|---|
| Austria | Vienna | 1 January | Rutte met with Chancellor Sebastian Kurz, and visited the Wiener Philharmoniker. |
| Switzerland | Davos | 24-25 January | Rutte attended the World Economic Forum. |
| Slovenia | Ljubljana | 6 February | Rutte met with Prime Minister Miro Cerar and was accompanied by his Belgian and Luxembourgish counterparts. |
| Bulgaria | Sofia | 6 February | Rutte met with Prime Minister Boyko Borissov. |
| South Korea | Pyeongchang | 9-11 February | Rutte met with President Moon and attended the Olympic Winter Games. |
| Germany | Munich | 16 February | Rutte attended the Munich Security Conference. |
| Germany | Berlin | 19 February | Rutte met with Chancellor Angela Merkel. |
| United Kingdom | London | 21 February | Rutte met with Prime Minister Theresa May. |
| Belgium | Brussels | 23 February | Rutte attended the Sahel and European Council Summit. |
| Germany | Berlin | 2 March | Rutte gave a speech about European cooperation on the invitation of the Bertelsmann Stiftung. |
| Belgium | Brussels | 23 March | Rutte attended the European Council Meeting. |
| United States | New York City | 27-28 March | Rutte met with Secretary-General António Guterres. Rutte opened the debate on the modernization of peace missions at the United Nations Security Council. The Netherlands had the presidency of the UNSC. |
| China | Hong Kong, Bo'ao, Guangzhou, Beijing | 9-12 April | Rutte accompanied a Dutch trade mission to the cities. Rutte met with President Xi Jinping. He spoke at the Bo'ao Forum for Asia where he encountered Prime Minister Sebastian Kurz. Rutte met with Prime Minister Li Keqiang, and visited the Beijing Foreign Studies University. |
| Sint Eustatius | Oranjestad | 13 May | Rutte visited the Dutch Caribbean to monitor progress on the redevelopment of the region after the destroying hurricanes of the year prior. |
| Saba | The Bottom | 14 May | Rutte visited the Dutch Caribbean to monitor progress on the redevelopment of the region after the destroying hurricanes of the year prior. |
| Sint Maarten | Philipsburg | 15 May | Rutte visited the Dutch Caribbean to monitor progress on the redevelopment of the region after the destroying hurricanes of the year prior. |
| Bulgaria | Sofia | 17 May | Rutte attended the EU-Western Balkans Summit. |
| India | Delhi | 24 May | Rutte met with Prime Minister Narendra Modi. |
| France | Strasbourg | 13 June | Rutte gave a speech about the future of Europe in front of the European Parliament. |
| Belgium | Brussels | 24 June | Rutte attended the EU Migration Summit. |
| Belgium | Brussels | 29 June | Rutte attended the European Council Meeting. |
| United States | Arlington, Washington, D.C. | 2 July | Rutte visited the Arlington Cemetery to commemorate the Unknown Soldier. Rutte visited the White House and met with President Trump. |
| Belgium | Brussels | 11-12 July | Rutte attended the NATO Summit. |
| Luxembourg | Luxembourg | 6 September | Rutte met with President Emmanuel Macron, Prime Minister Xavier Bettel and Prime Minister Charles Michel. |
| Romania | Bucharest | 12 September | Rutte met with President Klaus Iohannis and Prime Minister Viorica Dăncilă. |
| Austria | Salzburg | 20 September | Rutte attended an informal European Council Meeting. |
| United States | New York City | 25-27 September | Rutte attended the United Nations General Assembly. |
| Belgium | Brussels | 18-19 October | Rutte attended the Asia–Europe Meeting Summit. |
| Denmark | Copenhagen | 20 October | Rutte attended the P4G Summit. |
| Canada | Ottawa | 25 October | Rutte met with Prime Minister Trudeau, and accompanied a Dutch trade mission to the country. |
| Germany | Nordrhein Westfalen | 19 November | Rutte met with Armin Laschet. |
| Colombia | Bogotá | 28-29 November | Rutte met with President Ivan Duque, and accompanied a Dutch trade mission to the country. |
| Argentina | Buenos Aires | 30 November - 1 December | Rutte attended the G20 Summit where he had bilateral meetings with Turkish president Recep Tayyip Erdoğan, Australian prime minister Scott Morrison and Indian prime minister Narendra Modi. |
| Poland | Katowice | 3 December | Rutte attended the COP24. |
| Belgium | Brussels | 14 December | Rutte attended the European Council meeting. |
| Austria | Vienna | 18 December | Rutte attended the EU-Africa High Level Forum which focused on the enhancement of the economic relations between the EU and Africa emphasizing innovation, digitalisation and employment. |

== 2019 ==
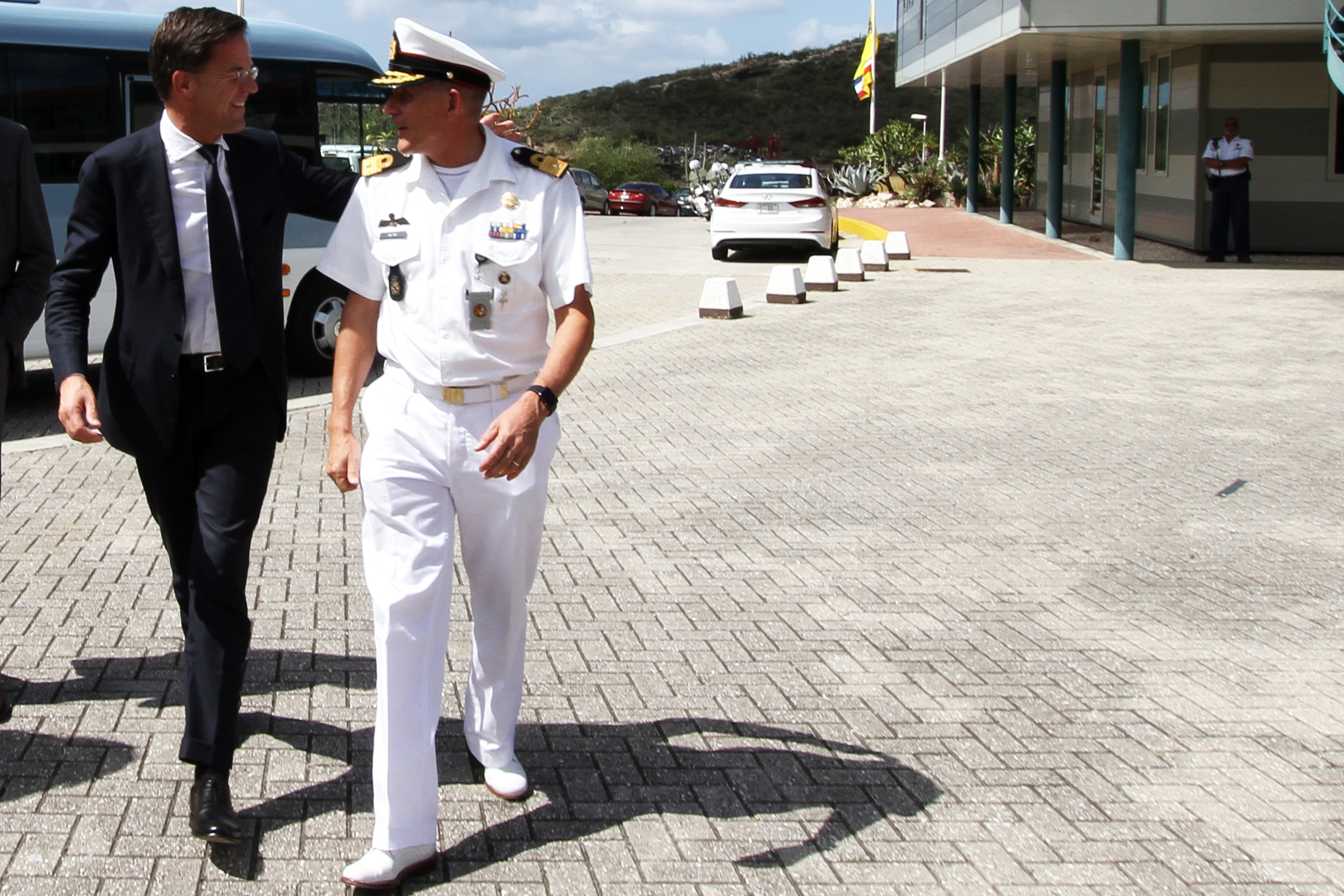
Rutte visits Curaçao.

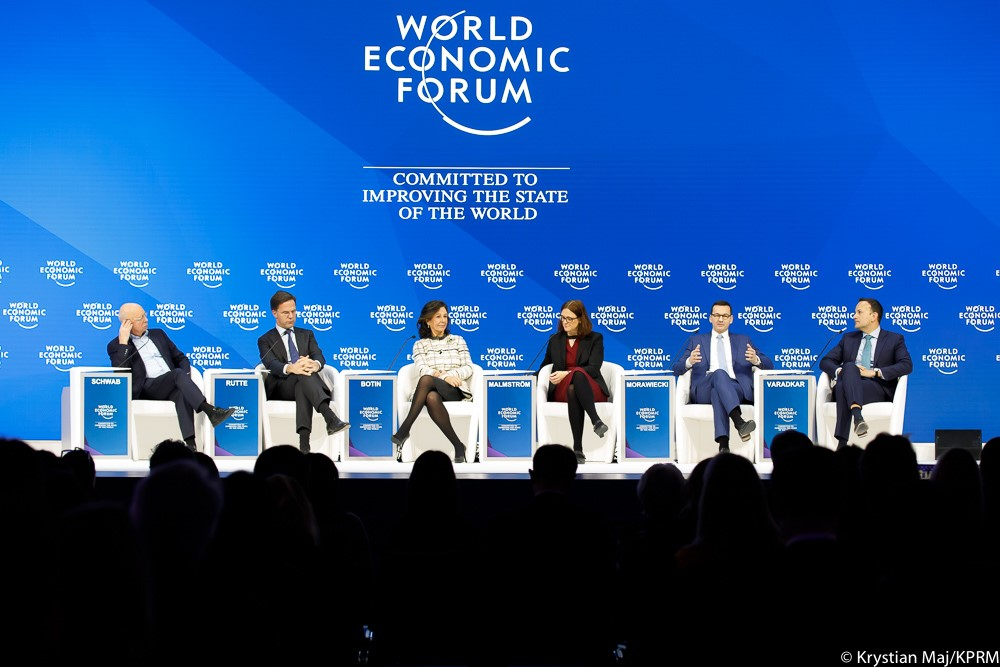
Rutte attending a panel discussion at the World Economic Forum in Davos, Switzerland.

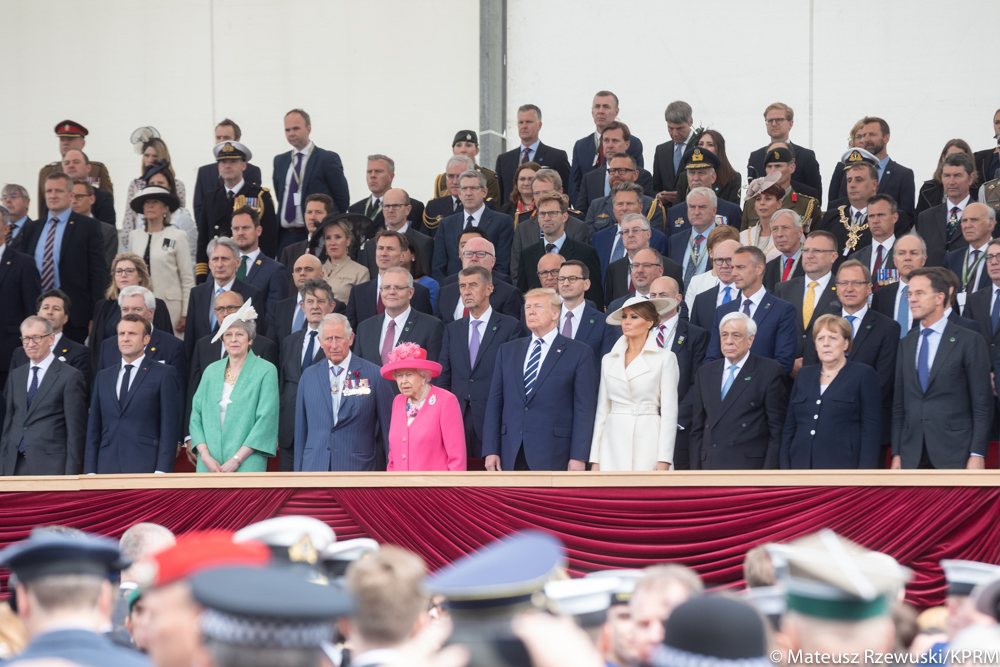
75th anniversary of the landing of Allied forces in Normandy.

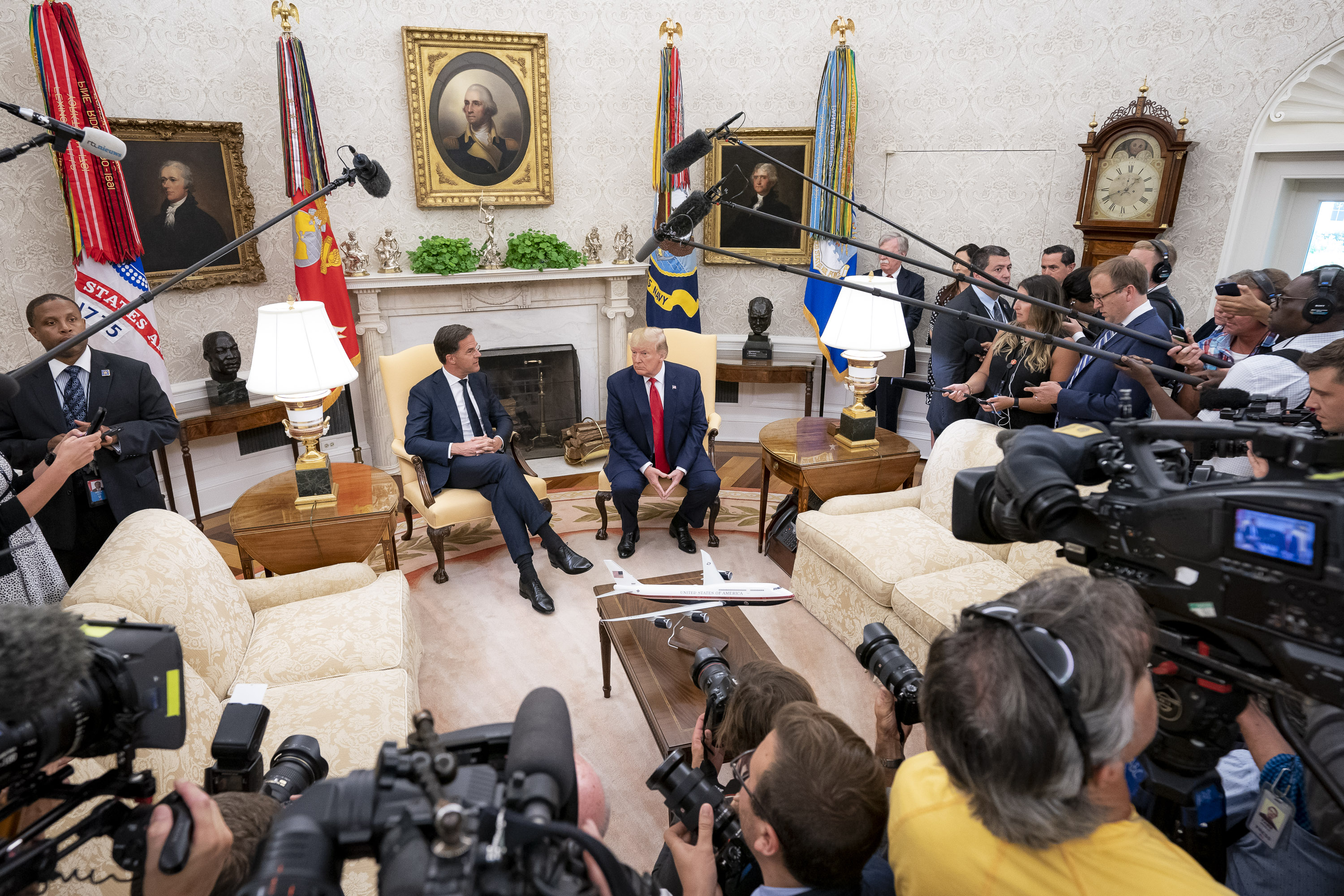
President Trump meets with the Prime Minister of the Netherlands.

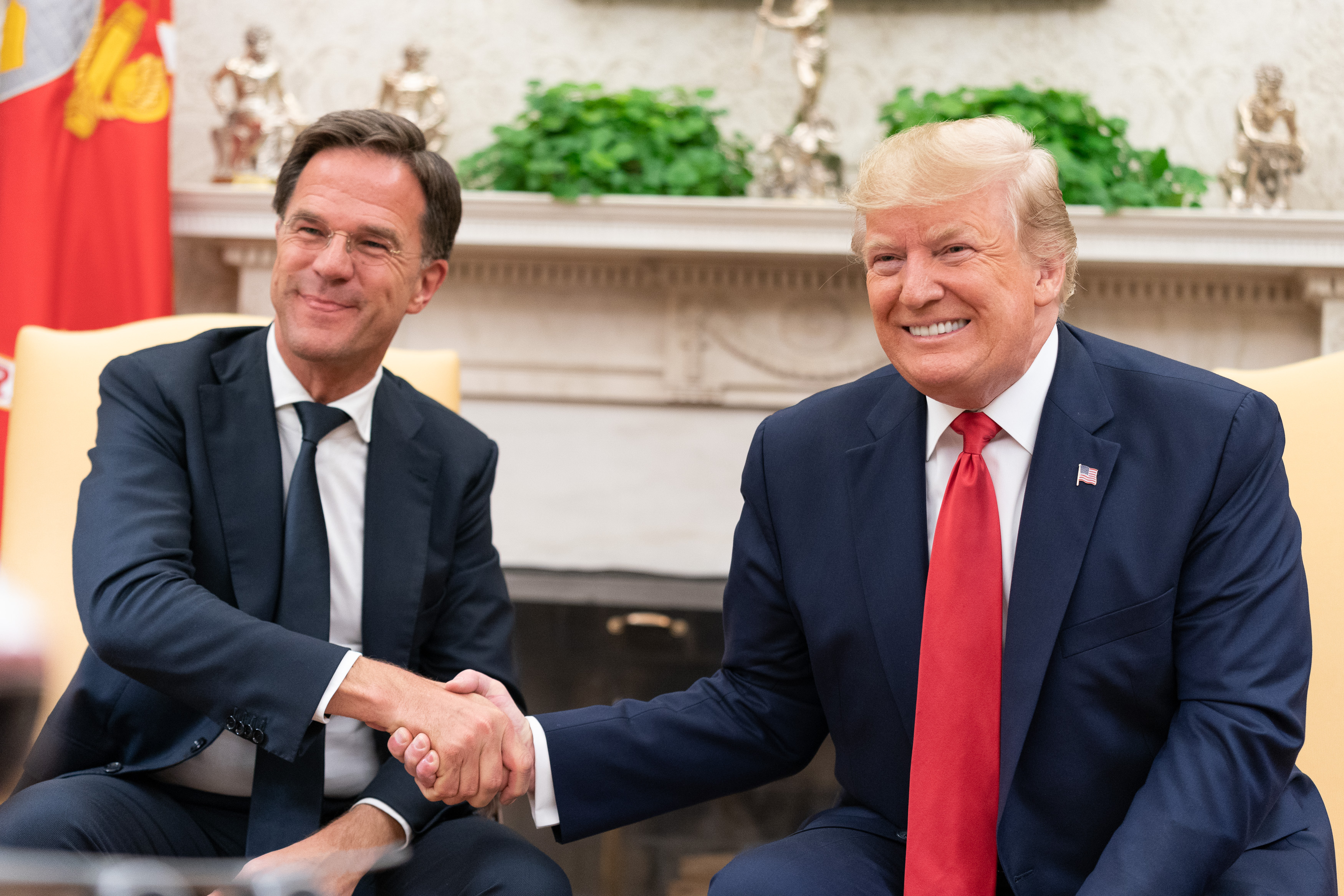
President Trump shakes hands with the Prime Minister of the Netherlands.

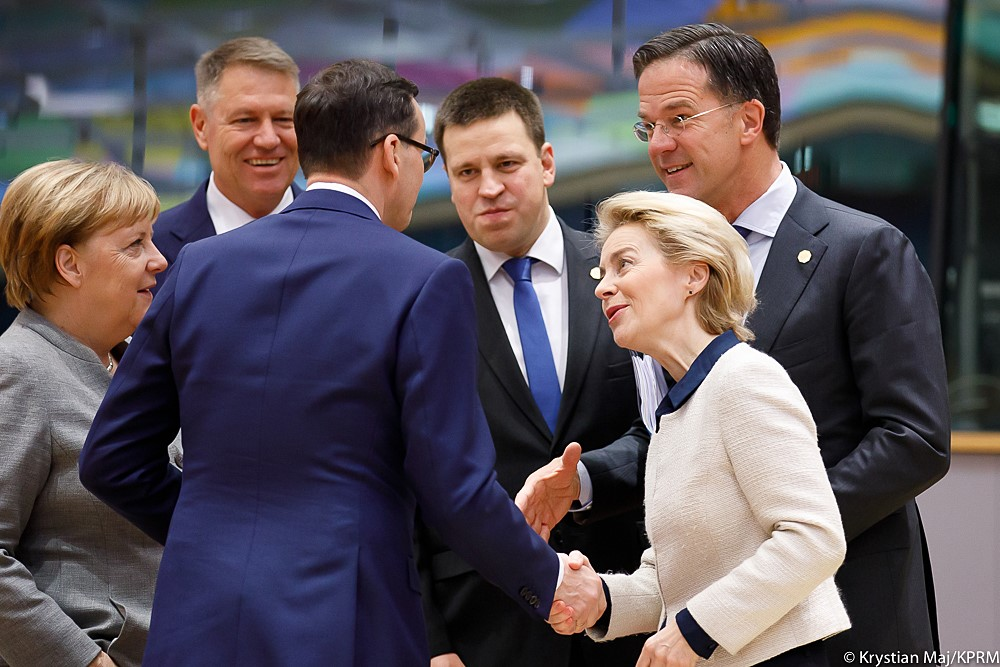
European Council meeting on 13 December 2019.

| Country | Areas visited | Date(s) | Details |
|---|---|---|---|
| Bonaire | Kralendijk | 20 January | Rutte met with Governor Edison Rijna. |
| Curaçao | Willemstad | 21 January | Rutte met with Prime Minister Eugene Rhuggenaath. |
| Aruba | Oranjestad | 22 January | Rutte met with Prime Minister Evelyn Wever-Croes. |
| Switzerland | Davos | 23-24 January | Rutte attended the World Economic Forum, and met with Prime Minister Jacinda Ardern, Ban Ki-moon, Bill Gates and Kristalina Georgieva. |
| Switzerland | Bern, Zürich | 13 February | Rutte met with Federal President Ueli Maurer. Rutte gave his 'Churchill Lecture' at the Europe Institute of the University of Zürich. |
| Finland | Helsinki | 19 February | Rutte met with Finnish prime minister Juha Sipilä. |
| Egypt | Sharm El-Sheikh | 24-25 February | Rutte attended the first-ever LAS-EU (Arab League and EU) Summit. |
| Belgium | Brussels | 21-22 March | Rutte attended the European Council meeting on Brexit. |
| Luxembourg | Luxembourg | 2 April | Rutte attended the Benelux Summit. |
| Portugal | Lisbon | 3 April | Rutte met with Prime Minister António Costa, and visited the University of Lisbon and Sporting Portugal. |
| Vietnam | Hanoi | 9 April | Rutte attended the Dutch trade mission to Vietnam, and met with Prime Minister Phuc. |
| Belgium | Brussels | 10-11 April | Rutte attended the European Council meeting on Brexit. |
| Romania | Sibiu | 9 May | Rutte attended the Sibiu Summit on the state of the European Union. |
| Germany | Berlin | 16 May | Rutte met Chancellor Angela Merkel. |
| Belgium | Brussels | 28 May | Rutte attended the European Council meeting. |
| United Kingdom | Portsmouth | 5 June | Rutte attended the commemoration of D-Day. |
| Belgium | Brussels | 20-21 June | Rutte attended the European Council meeting on the distribution of top functions for the new EU commissions. |
| China | Beijing | 27 June | Rutte met with Chinese prime minister Li Keqiang, and kicked off the Global Center on Adaptation in Beijing together with Ban Ki-moon. |
| Japan | Osaka | 28-29 June | Rutte attended the G20 Summit. |
| Belgium | Brussels | 30 June | Rutte attended the European Council meeting on the distribution of top functions for the new EU commissions. |
| France | Paris | 18 July | Rutte attended the celebration of Quatorze Juillet. |
| United States | Washington, D.C., Boston | 18-20 July | Rutte met with President Donald Trump in the White House. Rutte went on a trade mission together with a delegation of Dutch companies. They have visited Boston Dynamics and other companies focusing on robotics, AI, healthcare and climate. |
| United States | New York City | 23-25 September | Rutte attended the United Nations General Assembly together with Foreign Minister Sigrid Kaag, King Willem-Alexander and Minister Stef Blok. Within the margins of the General Assembly, the prime minister met with the prime ministers of the UK and Malaysia. In addition, Rutte received the Global Citizen Award for the Netherlands' contribution to transatlantic cooperation. |
| Germany | Berlin | 2 October | Rutte and his cabinet met with Chancellor Angela Merkel and her cabinet. |
| Indonesia | Bogor, Jakarta | 7 October | Rutte met with President Joko Widodo. Rutte visited the Erasmus Huis. |
| New Zealand | Auckland | 8 October | Rutte met with Prime Minister Jacinda Ardern, and visited Dutch companies as well as the University of Auckland. |
| Australia | Sydney, Melbourne | 9-11 October | Rutte visited Prime Minister Scott Morrison to discuss MH17 among other things. In addition Rutte visited the State Library of New South Wales to view the original diary of Tasman, and accompanied the Dutch trade delegation in the Opera House. Rutte visited Dutch companies and diaspora in Melbourne. |
| Nigeria | Abuja | 26 November | Rutte visited President Buhari. |
| Spain | Madrid | 2 December | Rutte attended the COP25. |
| United Kingdom | London | 3-4 December | Rutte attended the NATO Summit, participated in a town hall discussion together with Canadian prime minister Trudeau and met with Albanian prime minister Edi Rama. |
| Belgium | Brussels | 12-13 December | Rutte attended the European Council meeting with climate policy and the EU Green Deal as main topics. |

== 2020 ==
| Country | Areas visited | Date(s) | Details |
|---|---|---|---|
| Italy | Rome | 15 January | Rutte met with Prime Minister Giuseppe Conte. |
| Switzerland | Davos | 22-23 January | Rutte attended the World Economic Forum. |
| Poland | Oświęcim | 27 January | Rutte together with Queen Maxima and King Willem-Alexander attended a ceremony to commemorate the liberation of the Auschwitz concentration camp. |
| Belgium | Brussels | 1 February | Rutte met with the president of the European Commission Ursula von der Leyen. |
| Belgium | Brussels | 5 February | Rutte met with the president of the European Council Charles Michel. |
| France | Paris | 14 February | Rutte met with President Emmanuel Macron. |
| Germany | Munich | 15 February | Rutte attended the Munich Security Conference where he participated in a panel discussion and met the founder of Facebook Mark Zuckerberg. |
| Belgium | Brussels | 20 February | Rutte attended the European Council meeting that was focused on modernizing the EU budget where he combined forces with his counterparts from Denmark, Sweden and Austria. Thereafter this group of countries was called the 'Frugal Four'. |
| Germany | Berlin | 9 July | Rutte met with Chancellor Angela Merkel. |
| Belgium | Brussels | 17-18 July | Rutte attended the European Council meeting that was focused on the EU budget and the recovery fund for overcoming the impact of the COVID-19 pandemic. |
| Belgium | Brussels | 15-16 October | Rutte attended the European Council meeting that was focused on Brexit negotiations and the global pandemic. |
| Belgium | Brussels | 10 December | Rutte attended the European Council meeting that was focused on linking budgetary commitments to the rule of law and agreeing on greenhouse gas emission reduction targets. |

== 2021 ==
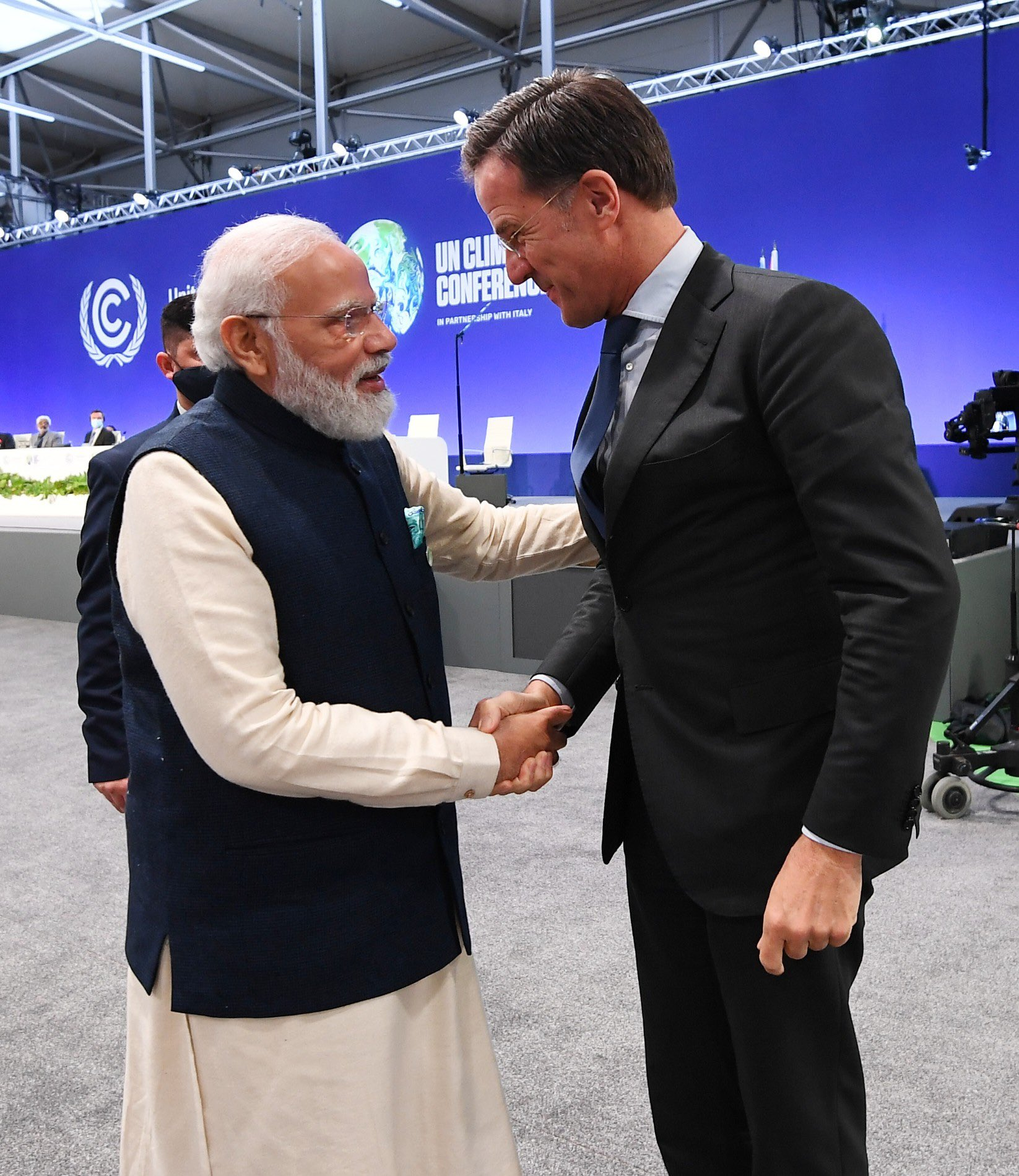
Narendra Modi met with Mark Rutte at COP26.

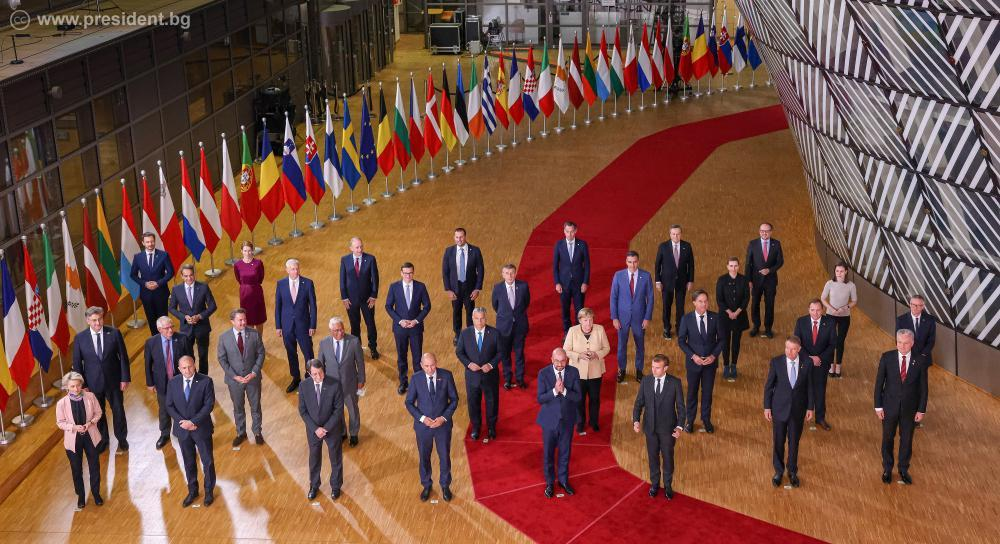
Group photo attendants of the European Council Summit October 2021.

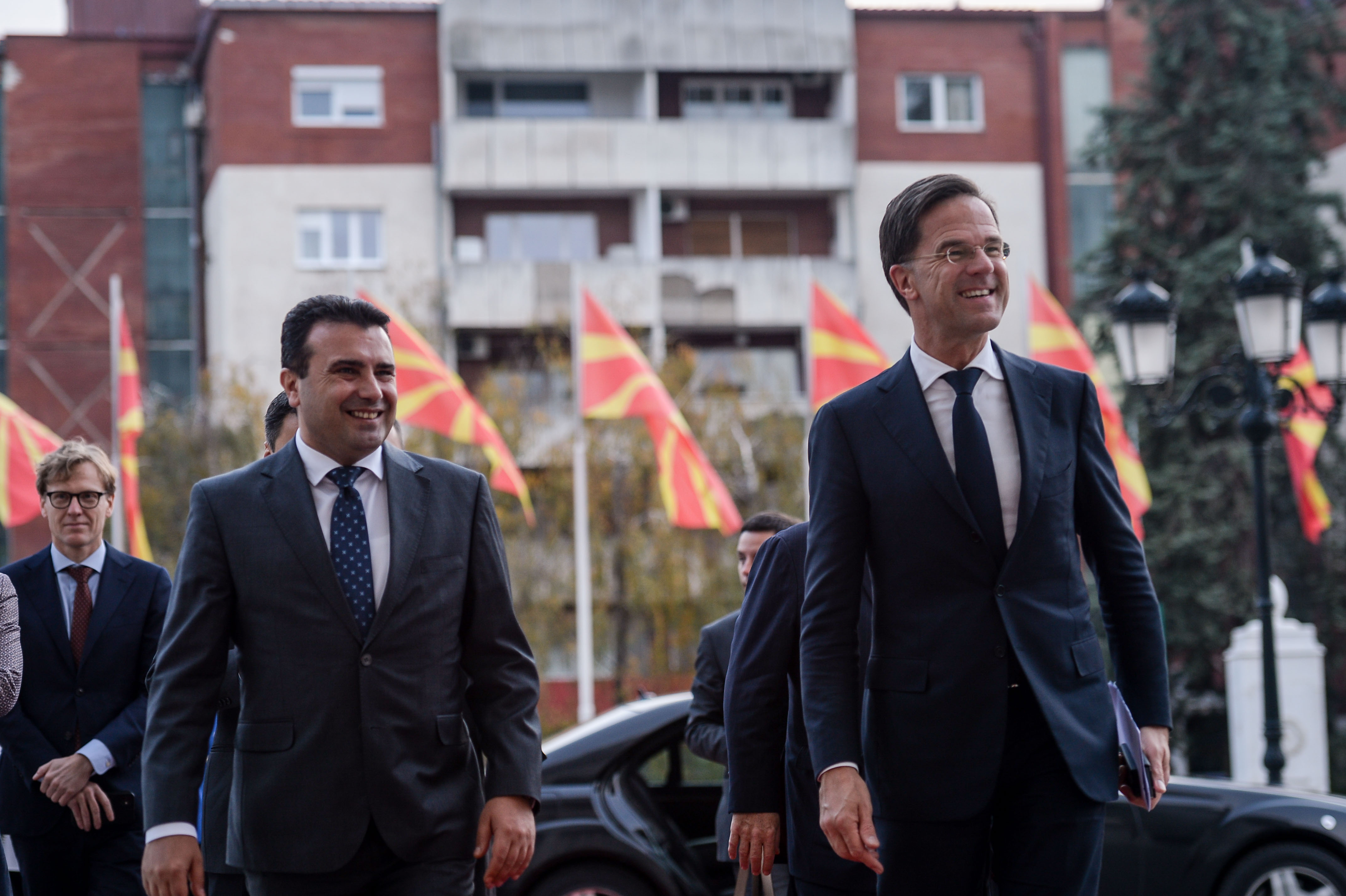
Official visit of the Prime Minister of the Netherlands, Mark Rutte to North Macedonia.

| Country | Areas visited | Date(s) | Details |
|---|---|---|---|
| Belgium | Brussels | 2 June | In preparation of the upcoming NATO Summit Rutte spoke with Jens Stoltenberg after which he met with the president of the EU Commission Ursula von der Leyen. |
| Belgium | Brussels | 14 June | Rutte attended the NATO Summit focusing on innovation and strengthening cooperation. During this summit he had bilateral meetings with President Biden, President Erdogan, Prime Minister Justin Trudeau and Prime Minister Kyriakos Mitsotakis. |
| Belgium | Antwerp, Brussels | 24-25 June | Rutte opened the new Dutch consulate-general. Rutte attended the European Council meeting. |
| France | Paris | 1 September | Rutte met with President Emmanuel Macron to discuss the situation in Afghanistan. |
| Germany | Dresden | 9 September | Rutte met with Chancellor Angela Merkel. |
| United Kingdom | London | 17 September | Rutte met with Boris Johnson to discuss their cooperation in Afghanistan, EU-UK relations and the upcoming COP26. |
| United States | New York City | 24 September | Rutte attended the United Nations General Assembly. |
| Slovenia | Kranj | 6 October | Rutte attended the EU-Western Balkans summit. |
| Belgium | Brussels | 21-22 October | Rutte attended the European Council meeting. |
| Italy | Rome | 30 October - 1 November | Rutte attended the G20 to discuss sustainable economic recovery after the COVID-19 pandemic, climate action and international trade. |
| United Kingdom | Glasgow | 1 November | Rutte attended the COP26 to discuss climate change and climate action. |
| Greece | Athens | 9 November | Rutte met with Greek Prime Minister Kyriakos Mitsotakis to discuss European migration strategies and effective action against climate change following COP26. |
| Albania | Tirana | 10 November | Rutte met with Prime Minister Edi Rama to enhance ties between the countries. Aside of this the progress of Albania with regards to the EU Membership was discussed. |
| North Macedonia | Skopje | 11 November | Rutte met with President Stevo Pendarovski and Prime Minister Zoran Zaev to enhance ties between the countries. Aside of this the progress of North Macedonia with regards to the EU Membership was discussed. |
| Belgium | Brussels | 16 December | Rutte attended the European Council meeting where the situation at the Ukrainian border and in Belarus was discussed as well as the European coordination in the fight against the coronavirus. |

== 2022 ==
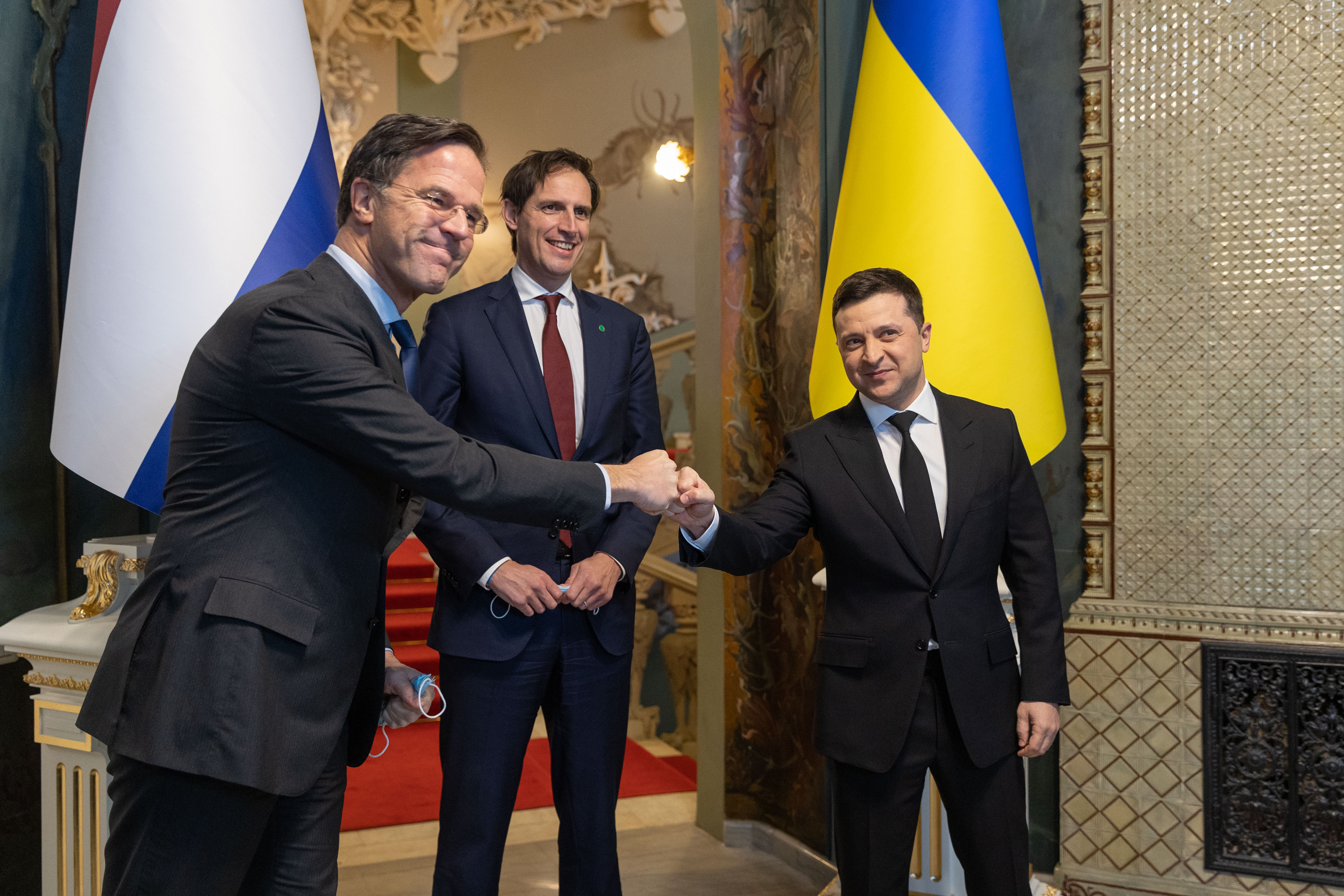
Volodymyr Zelenskyy met with Dutch PM Mark Rutte and Foreign Minister Wopke Hoekstra in occasion of possible Russian invasion.

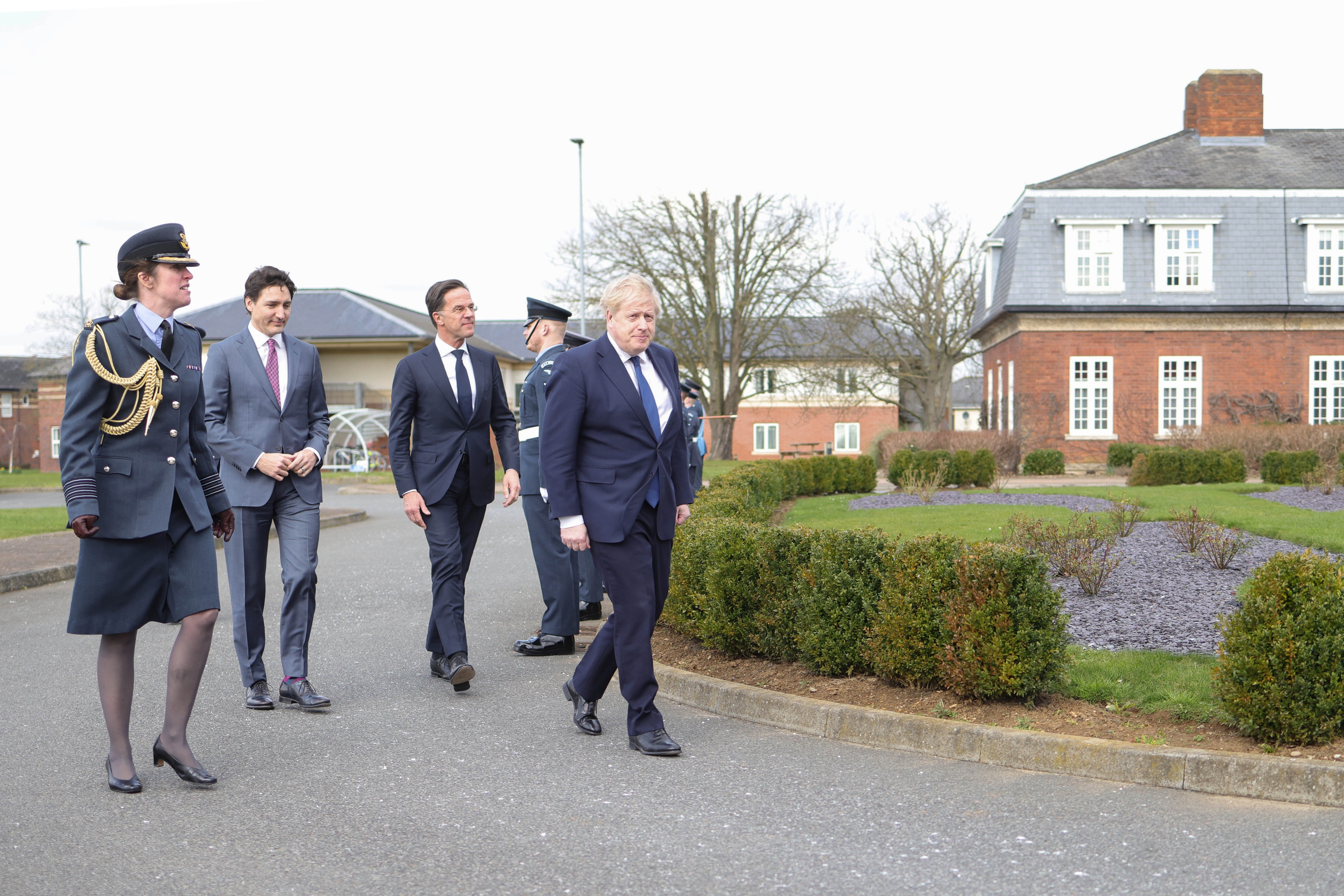
Johnson, Trudeau and Rutte Trilateral visit to RAF Northolt to support Ukraine.

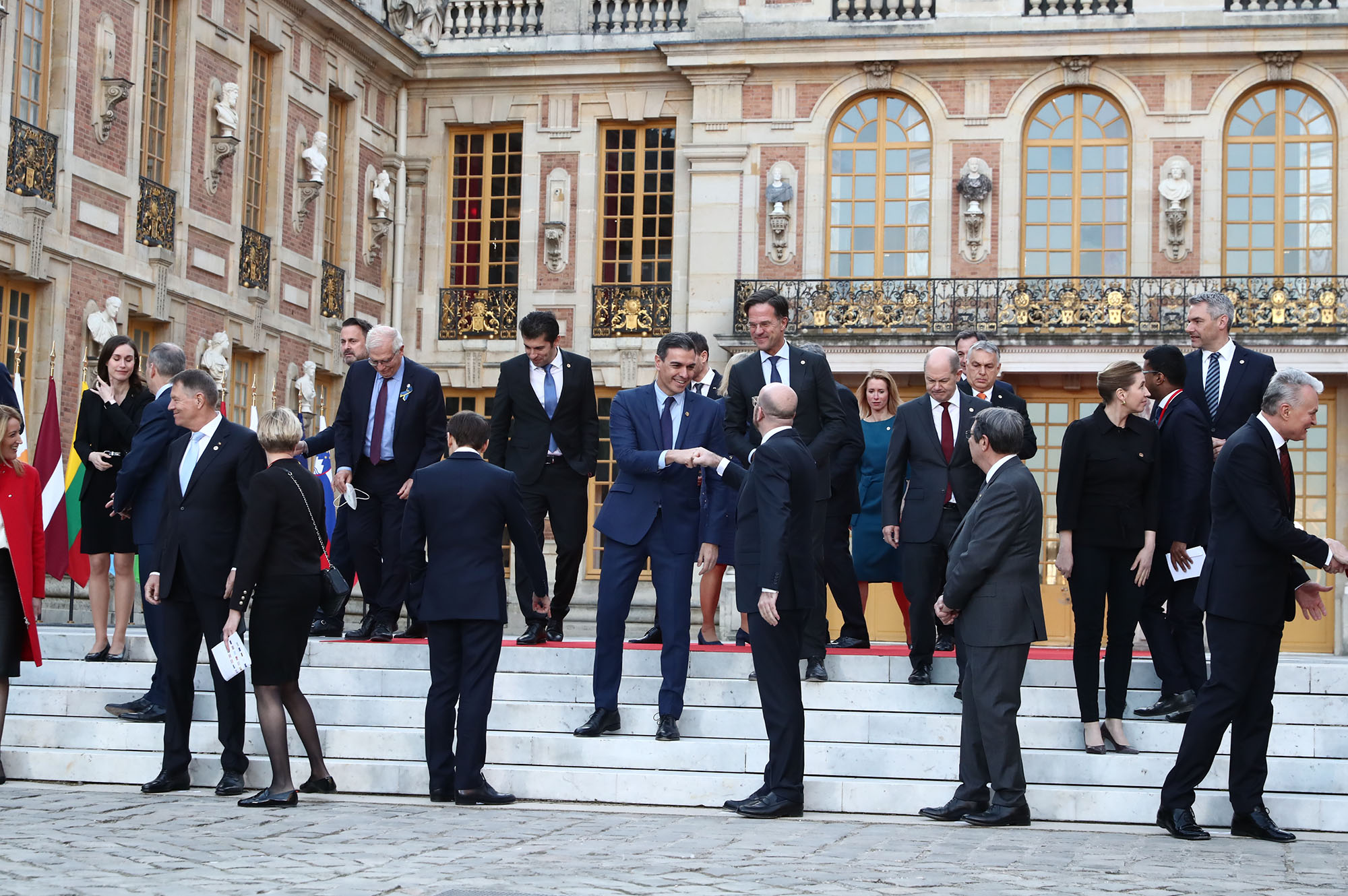
Heads of government preparing to take a group photo at the 2022 Versailles informal summit of EU Heads of State and Government.

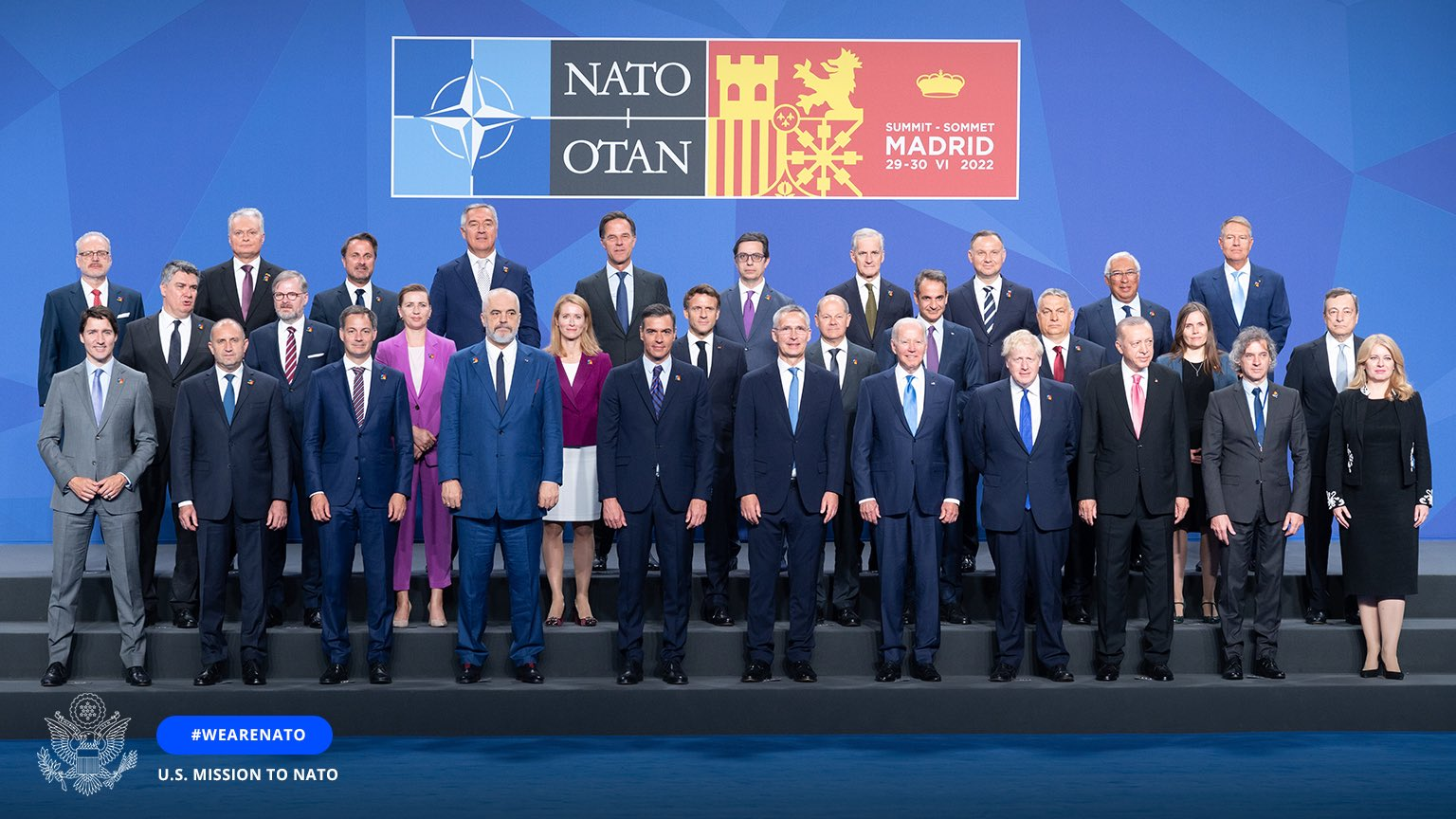
Group photo of 2022 Madrid Summit.

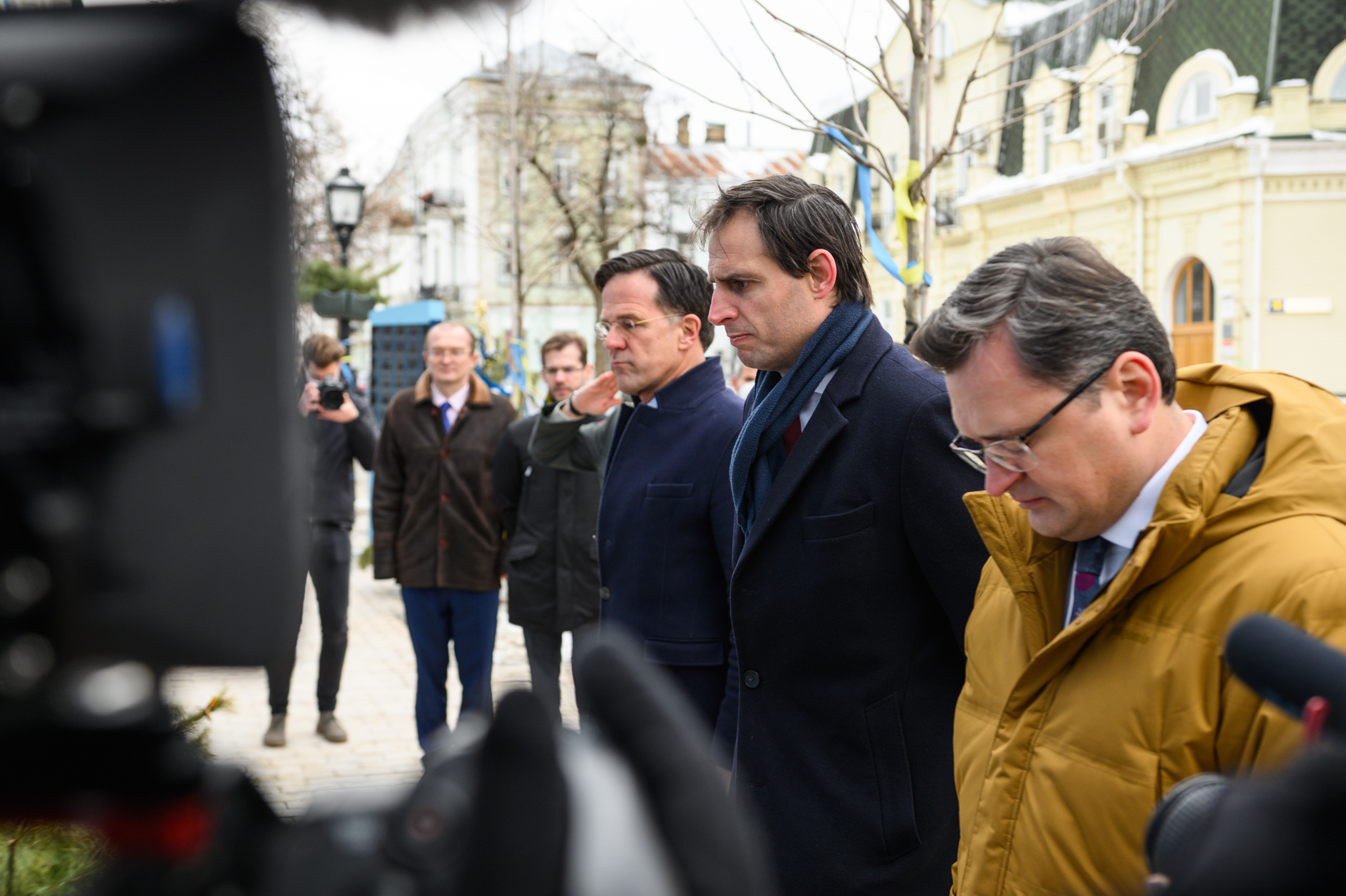
Hoekstra and Rutte visit Ukraine during the Russo-Ukrainian war.

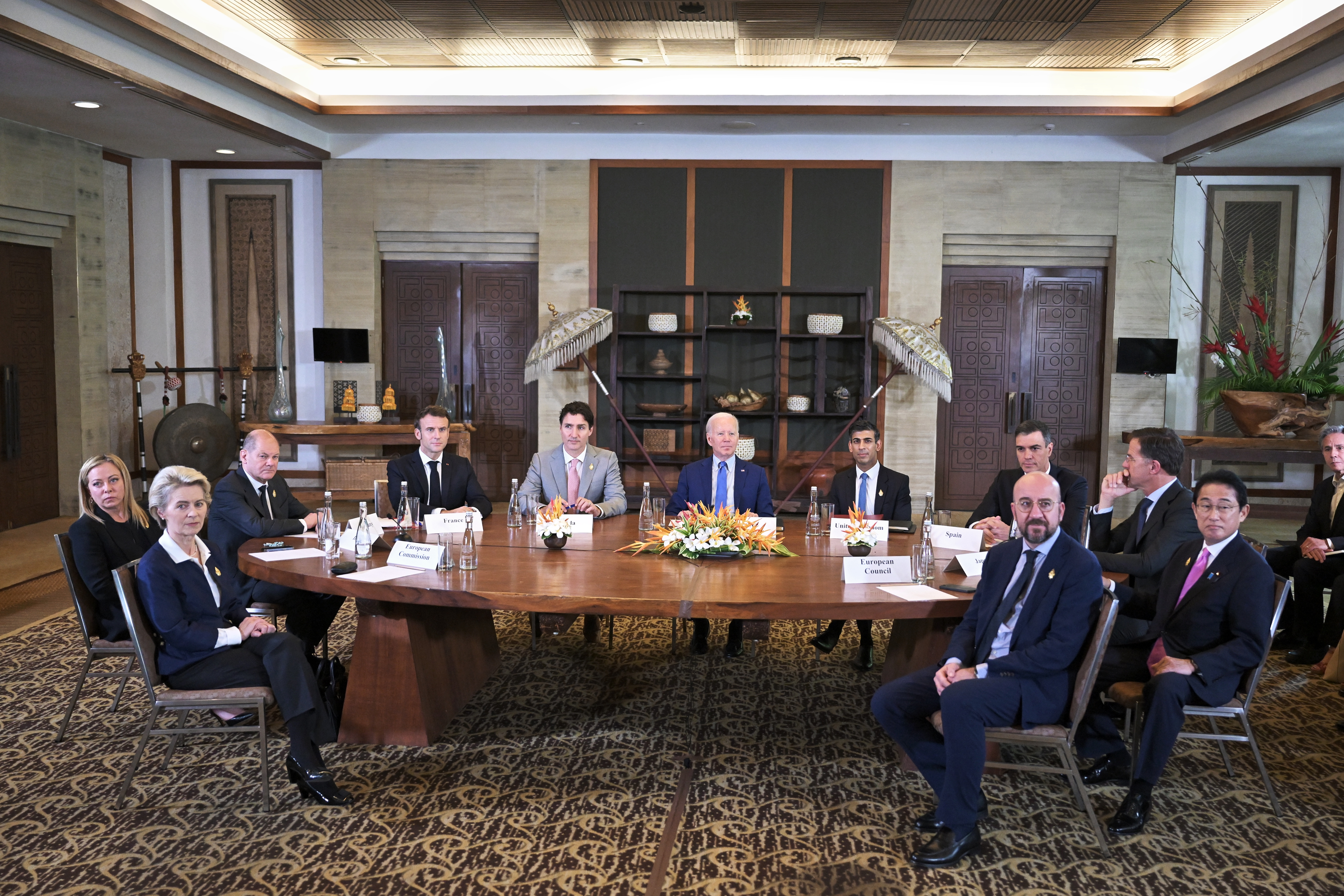
Rutte attended an emergency meeting after Poland was hit by missile.

| Country | Areas visited | Date(s) | Details |
|---|---|---|---|
| Germany | Berlin | 13 January | Rutte met with Chancellor Olaf Scholz. |
| Slovakia | Bratislava | 27 January | Rutte visited Slovakia to meet with Prime Minister Eduard Heger to discuss climate change, strengthening the rule of law, economic matters and the situation at the Ukrainian border. Both prime ministers marked International Holocaust Remembrance Day by laying flowers in memory of the victims at the Holocaust Memorial in Bratislava. |
| Ukraine | Kyiv | 1-2 February | Rutte visited Ukraine to meet with President Volodymyr Zelenskyy in light of the situation at the border with Russia and the collaboration with regards to flight MH17. |
| Moldova | Chișinău | 2 February | Rutte and Wopke Hoekstra visited Moldova to meet with President Maia Sandu to discuss reforms, the geopolitical situation and diplomatic ties between the Netherlands and Moldova. |
| Belgium | Brussels | 3 February | Rutte met the president of the European Parliament Roberta Metsola. |
| Belgium | Brussels | 17 February | Rutte attended the first EU-AU Summit since 2017 and discussed the situation in Ukraine, the COVID-19 pandemic and climate change among other things. |
| United Kingdom | Northolt | 7 March | Rutte met with Canadian prime minister Justin Trudeau and British prime minister Boris Johnson to discuss aid for Ukraine. |
| France | Paris, Versailles | 9-11 March | Rutte's cabinet met with the cabinet of President Emmanuel Macron. In addition Rutte gave a speech about the Russian invasion of Ukraine at Sciences Po. Rutte attended an informal EU Summit to discuss the war in Ukraine and the Union's future economic growth and investment model. |
| Lithuania | Vilnius | 21 March | Rutte visited Lithuania to meet with President Gitanas Nausėda in light of the war in Ukraine. |
| Poland | Warsaw | 21 March | Rutte visited Poland to meet with President Andrzej Duda in light of the Russian invasion of Ukraine. |
| Turkey | Ankara | 22 March | Rutte visited Turkey to meet with Turkish president Erdoğan to discuss the war in Ukraine and EU-Turkey relations. |
| Belgium | Brussels | 24 March | Rutte visited Belgium to attend the NATO summit to discuss further aid to Ukraine and sanctions against Russia. |
| Spain | Madrid | 30 March | Prime Minister Rutte went to Madrid to visit Prime Minister Sánchez of Spain, an audience with King Felipe VI and a speech at the Fundación Carlos de Amberes. |
| Italy | Rome | 7 April | Prime Minister Rutte went to Rome to visit Prime Minister Mario Draghi to discuss the war in Ukraine, climate policy and modernizing the EU's Stability and Growth Pact. |
| Belgium | Ghent | 19 April | Prime Minister Rutte together with his cabinet went to Ghent to visit Prime Minister Alexander De Croo and the cabinet of Belgium. |
| Bulgaria | Sofia | 16 May | Rutte went to Bulgaria for a visit to the Dutch military personnel who participate in the NATO force and a meeting with Prime Minister Kiril Petkov. |
| Denmark | Esbjerg | 18 May | Rutte went to Esbjerg, Denmark to attend the North Sea Summit with his Belgian, Danish, German and EU counterparts to discuss opportunities for turning the North Sea into the 'Green Power Plant of Europe'. |
| Ireland | Dublin | 23 May | Rutte met with Prime Minister Micheál Martin. |
| Switzerland | Davos | 24-25 May | Rutte attended the World Economic Forum. |
| Belgium | Brussels | 30-31 May | Rutte attended the European Council meeting. |
| United States | Washington | 2-5 June | Rutte attended the Bilderberg conference. |
| Belgium | Brussels | 23 June | Rutte attended the Western Balkan Summit. |
| Spain | Madrid | 28-30 June | Rutte attended the NATO Summit to discuss the accession of Finland and Sweden to NATO. |
| Ukraine | Kyiv | 11 July | Rutte met President Zelenskyy and visited destroyed parts of the city due to the war in Ukraine. |
| Suriname | Paramaribo | 12-13 September | Rutte visited Suriname and met with president Chan Santokhi and the South American country's parliament. This was the first trip by a prime minister of the Netherlands since 2008. |
| United States | New York City | 23 September | Rutte attended the General debate of the seventy-seventh session of the United Nations General Assembly. |
| Germany | Berlin | 4 October | Rutte visited the newly installed German government together with ministers Mark Harbers, Micky Adriaansens, Liesje Schreinemacher and Rob Jetten. |
| Czech Republic | Prague | 6-7 October | Rutte attended the meeting of the European Political Community and an informal European Council meeting. |
| Belgium | Brussels | 20 October | Rutte attended the European Council meeting. |
| Israel | Tel Aviv, Jerusalem | 24 October | Rutte met with former PM Benjamin Netanyahu, PM Yair Lapid and minister of Defense Benny Gantz. |
| Palestine | Jerusalem, Ramallah | 25 October | Rutte met with Palestinian President Mahmoud Abbas. |
| Egypt | Sharm El-Sheikh | 7 November | Rutte attended the 2022 United Nations Climate Change Conference. |
| Indonesia | Bali | 15-16 November | Rutte attended the 2022 G20 Bali summit. |
| Luxembourg | Luxembourg | 28 November | Rutte attended the Benelux Summit. |
| Albania | Tirana | 6 December | Rutte attended the EU-Western Balkans Summit. |

== 2023 ==
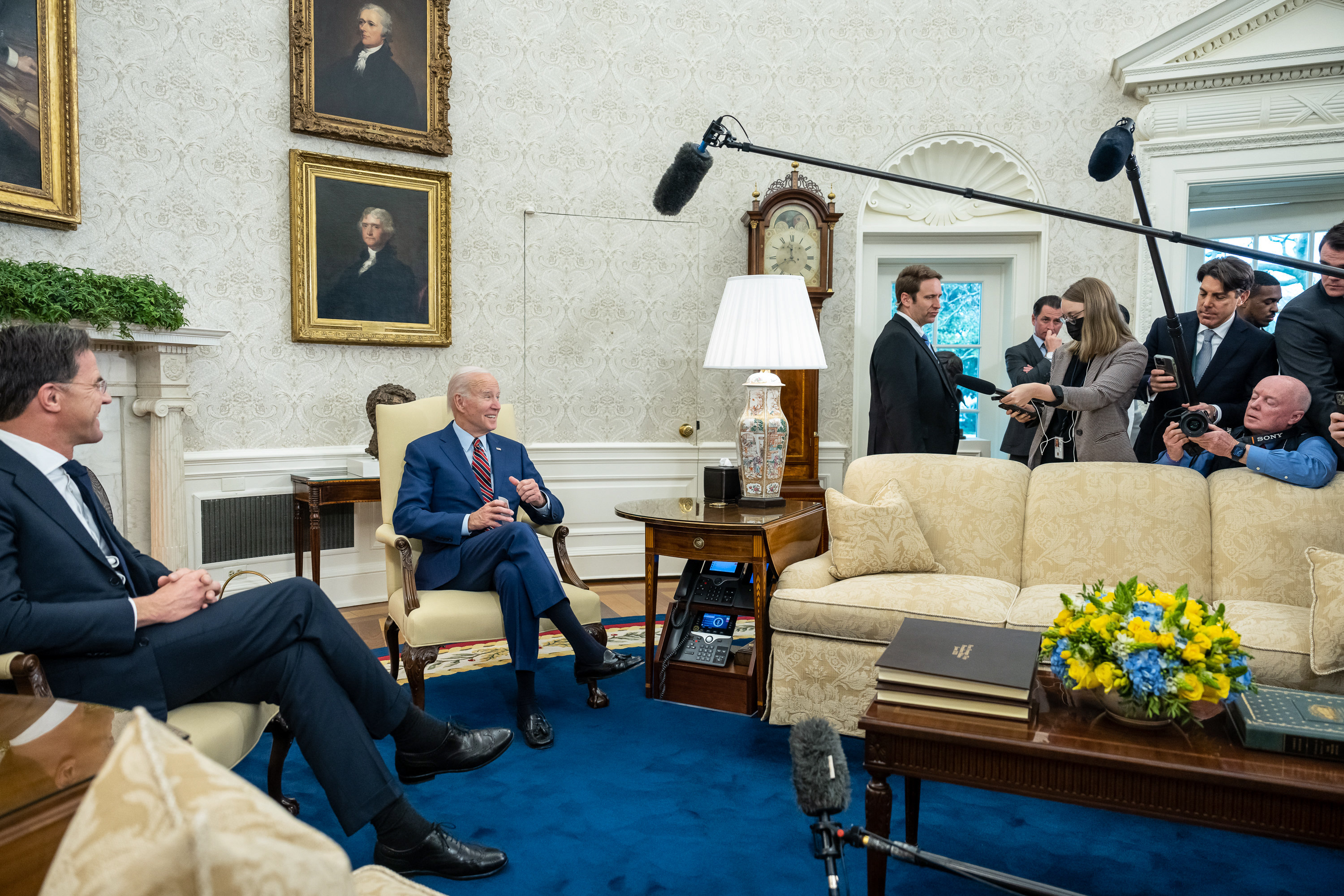
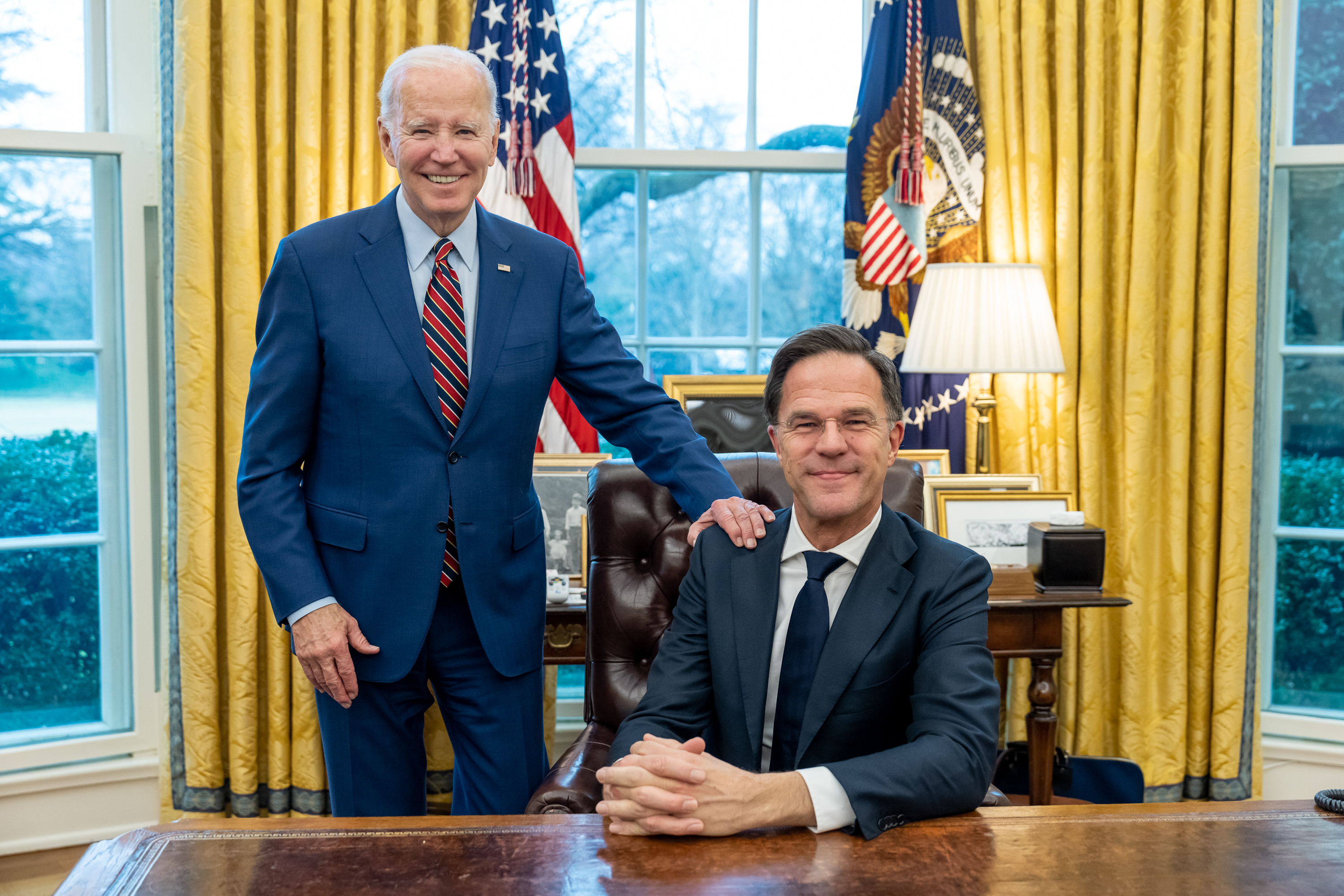
Mark Rutte visiting Joe Biden in the Oval Office (January 2023).
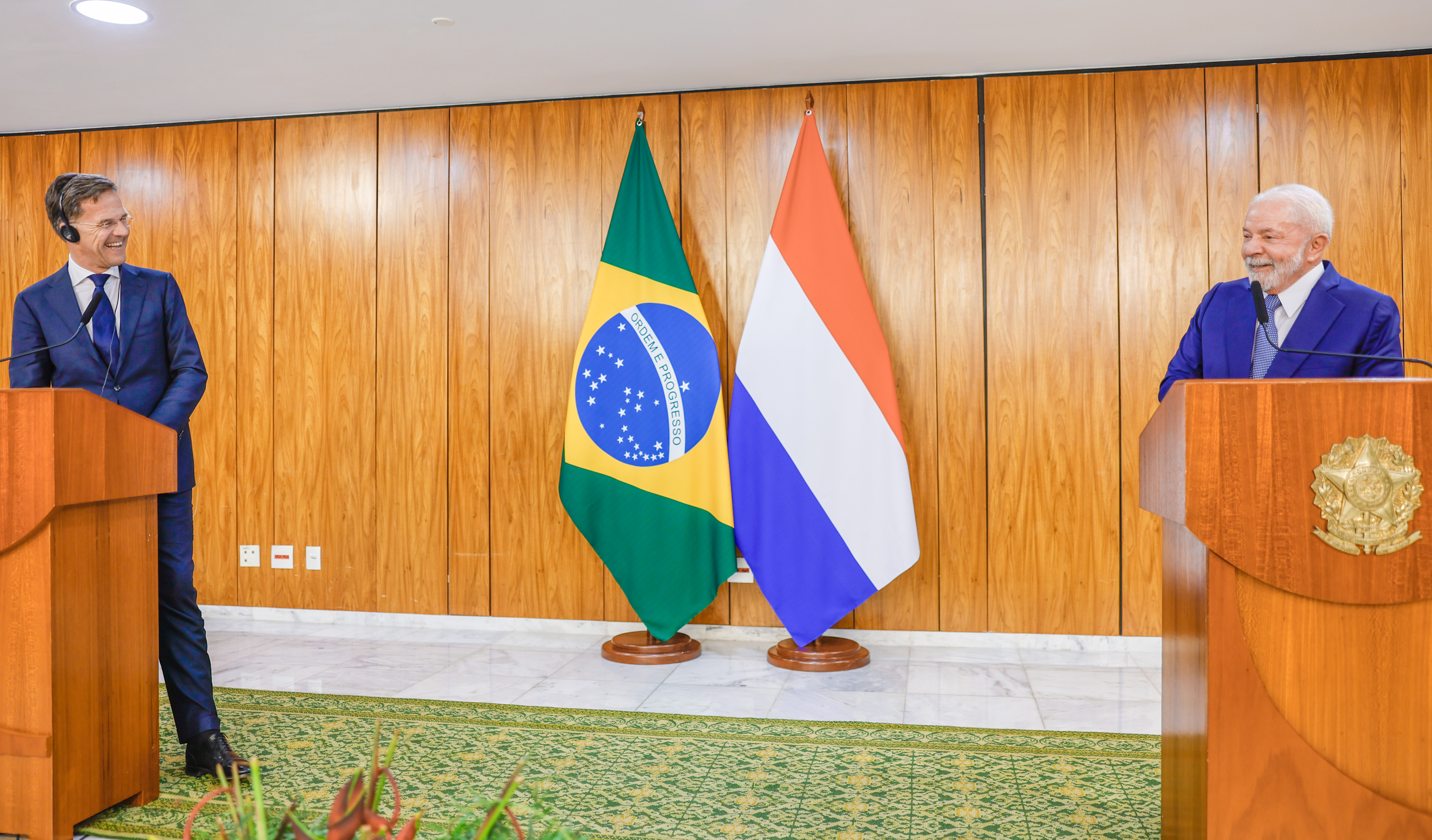
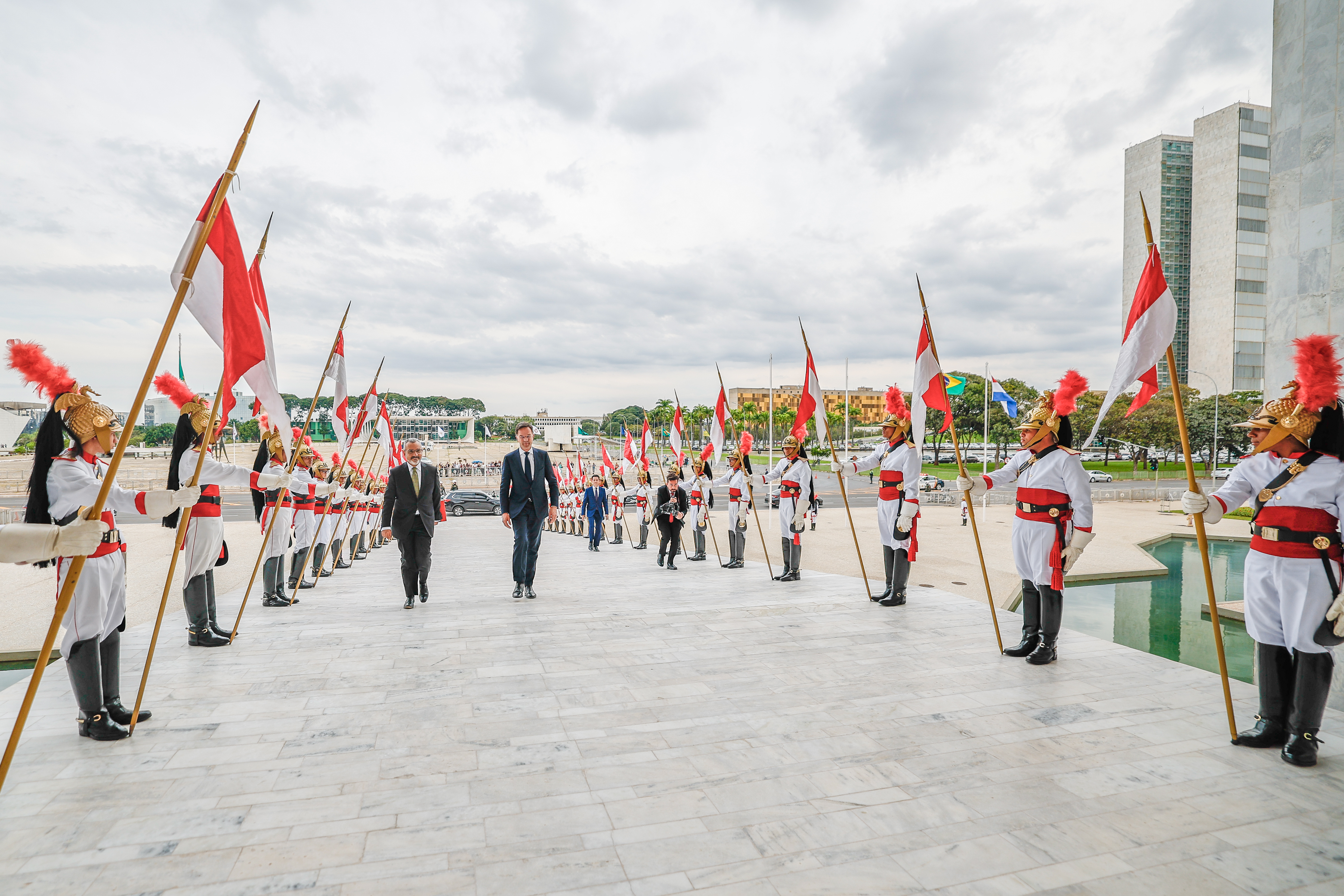
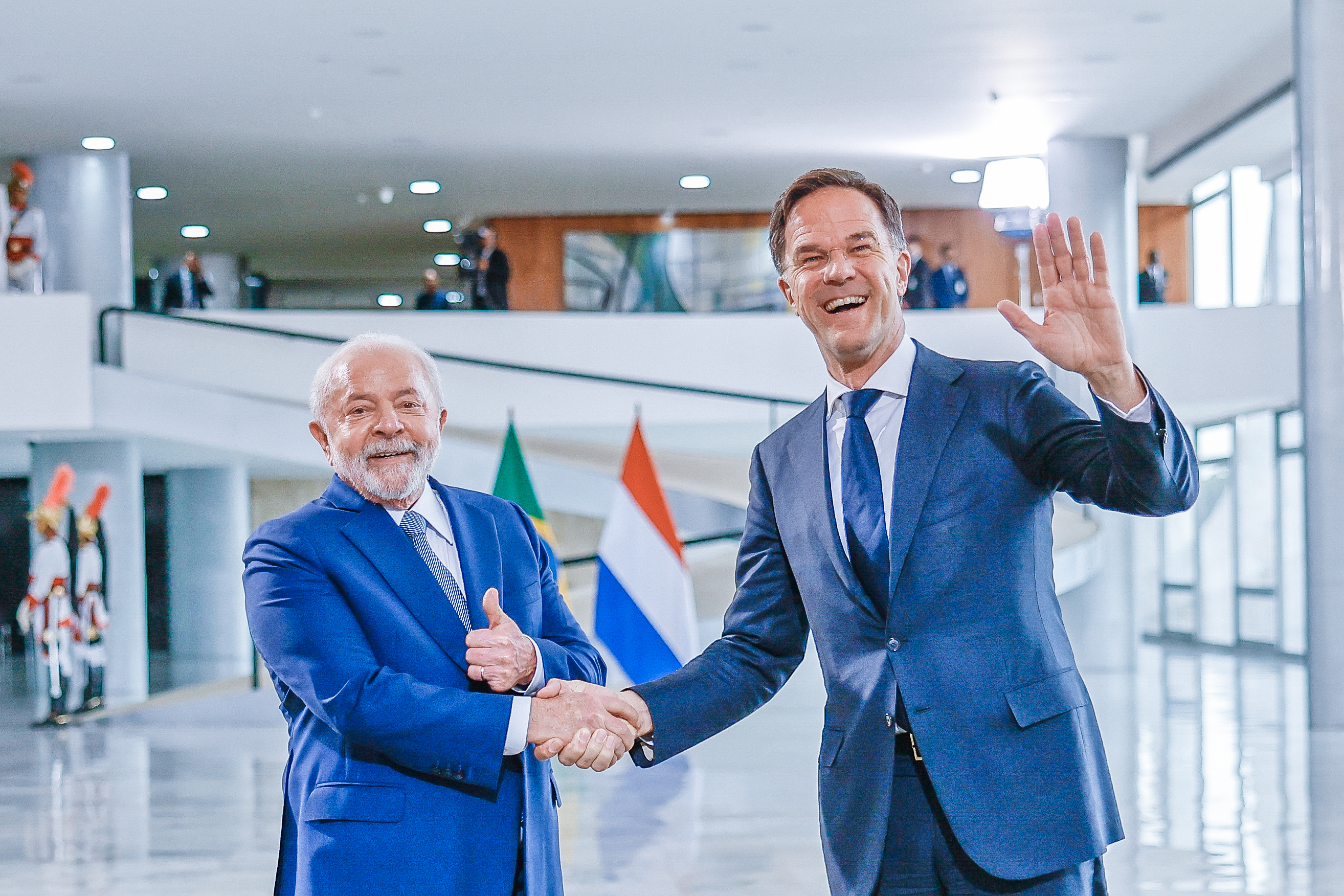
Mark Rutte visiting Brazilian president Lula da Silva (May 2023).
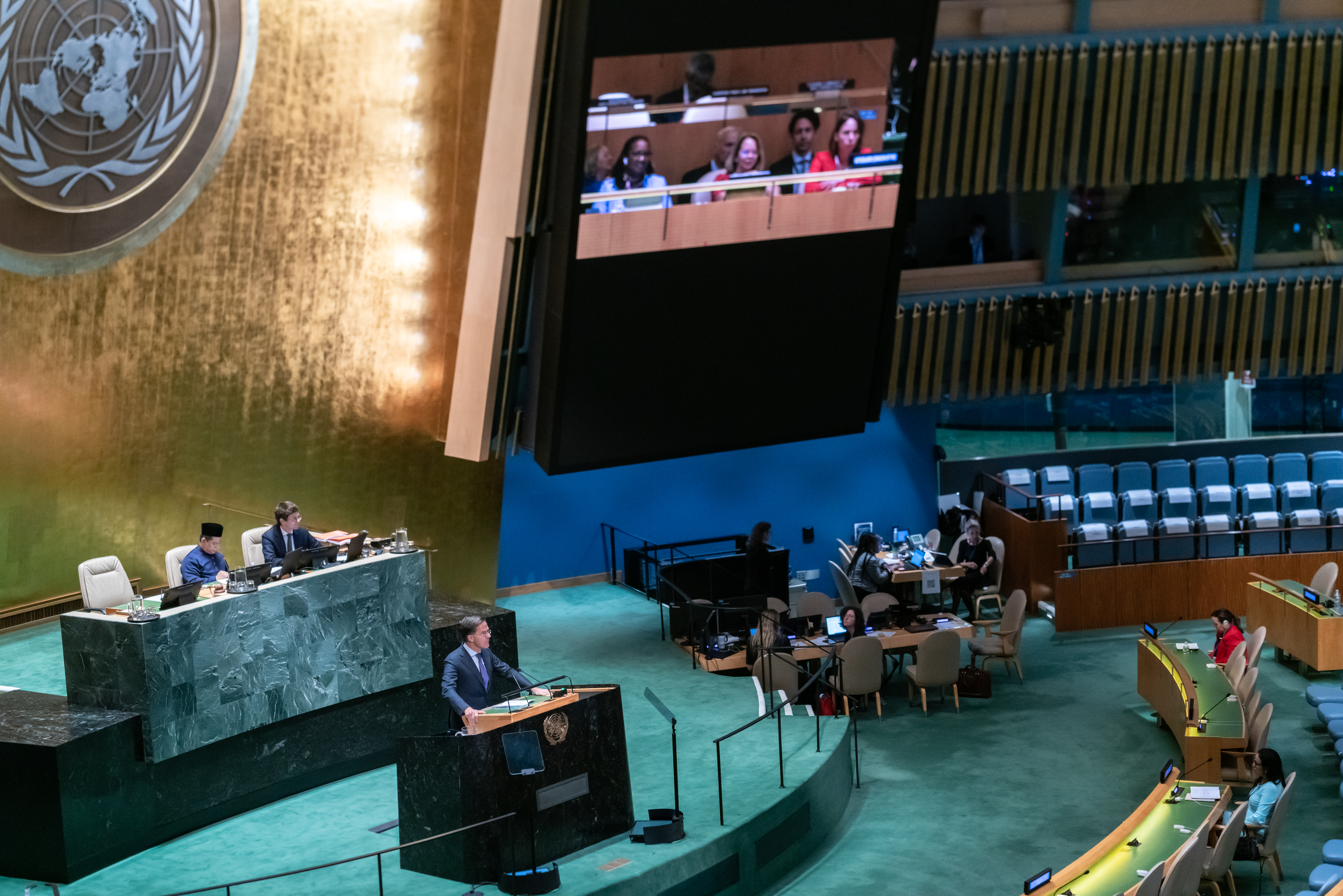
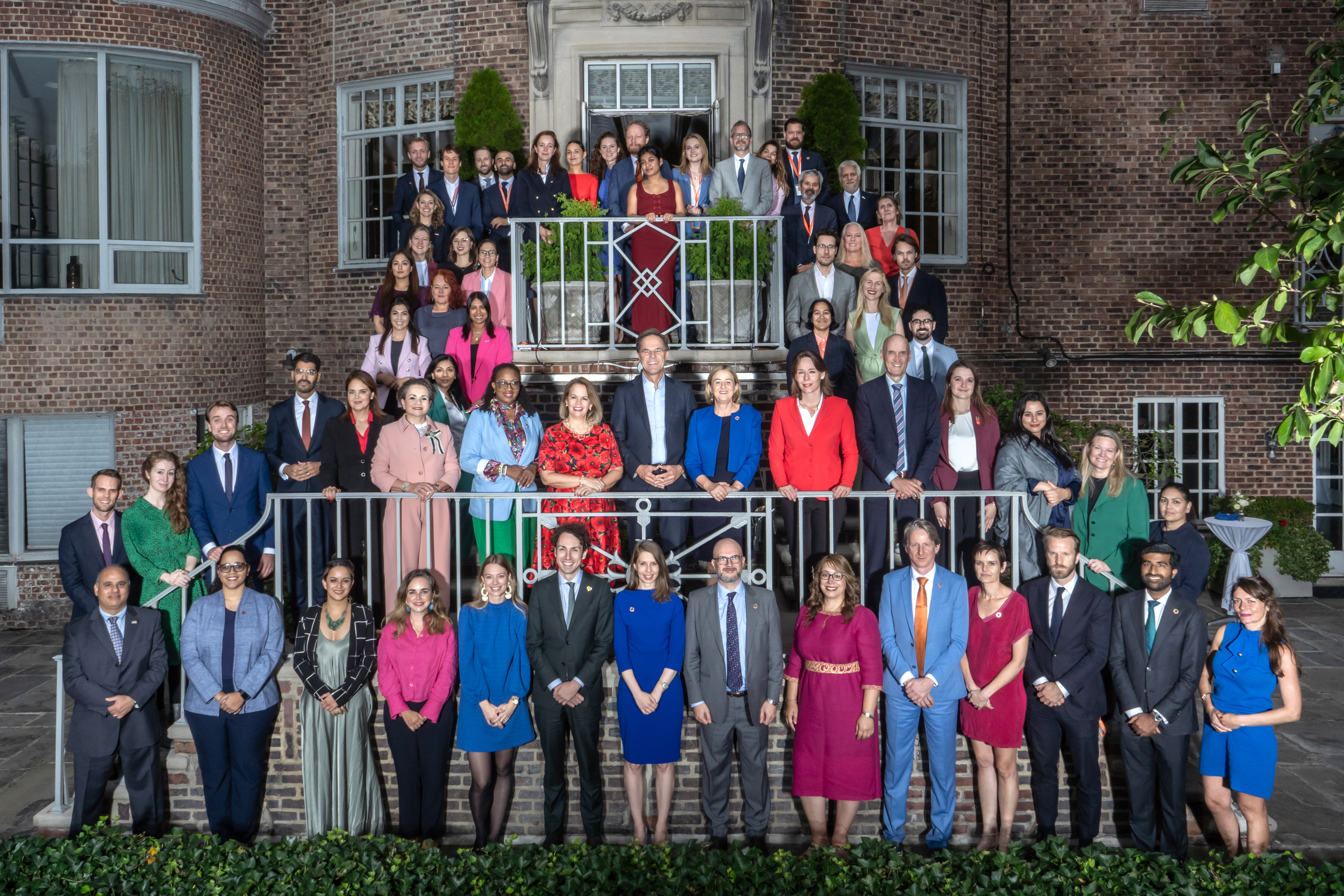
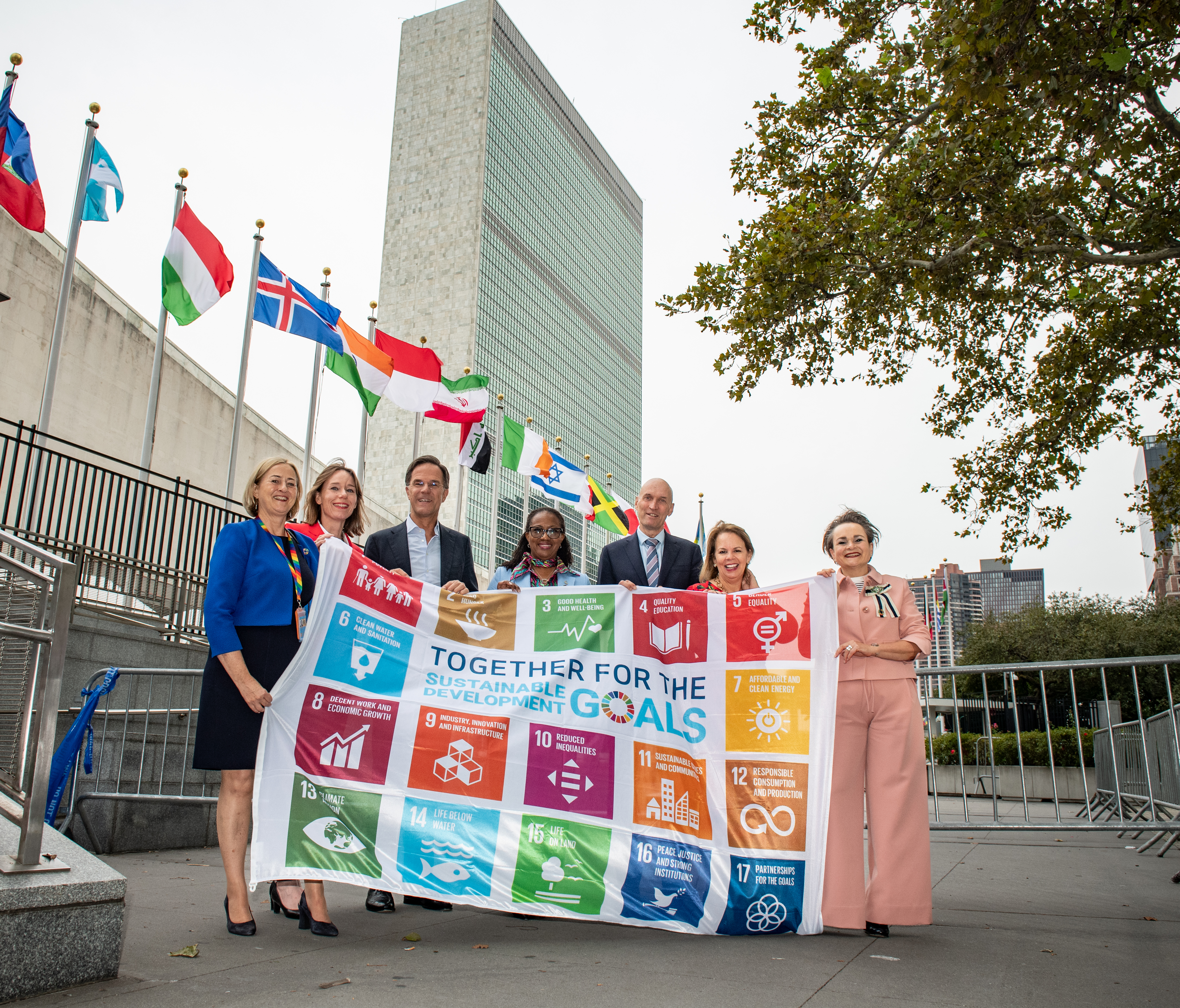
Mark Rutte poses with the Prime Ministers of Dutch overseas territories, and with UNGA staff (September 2023).
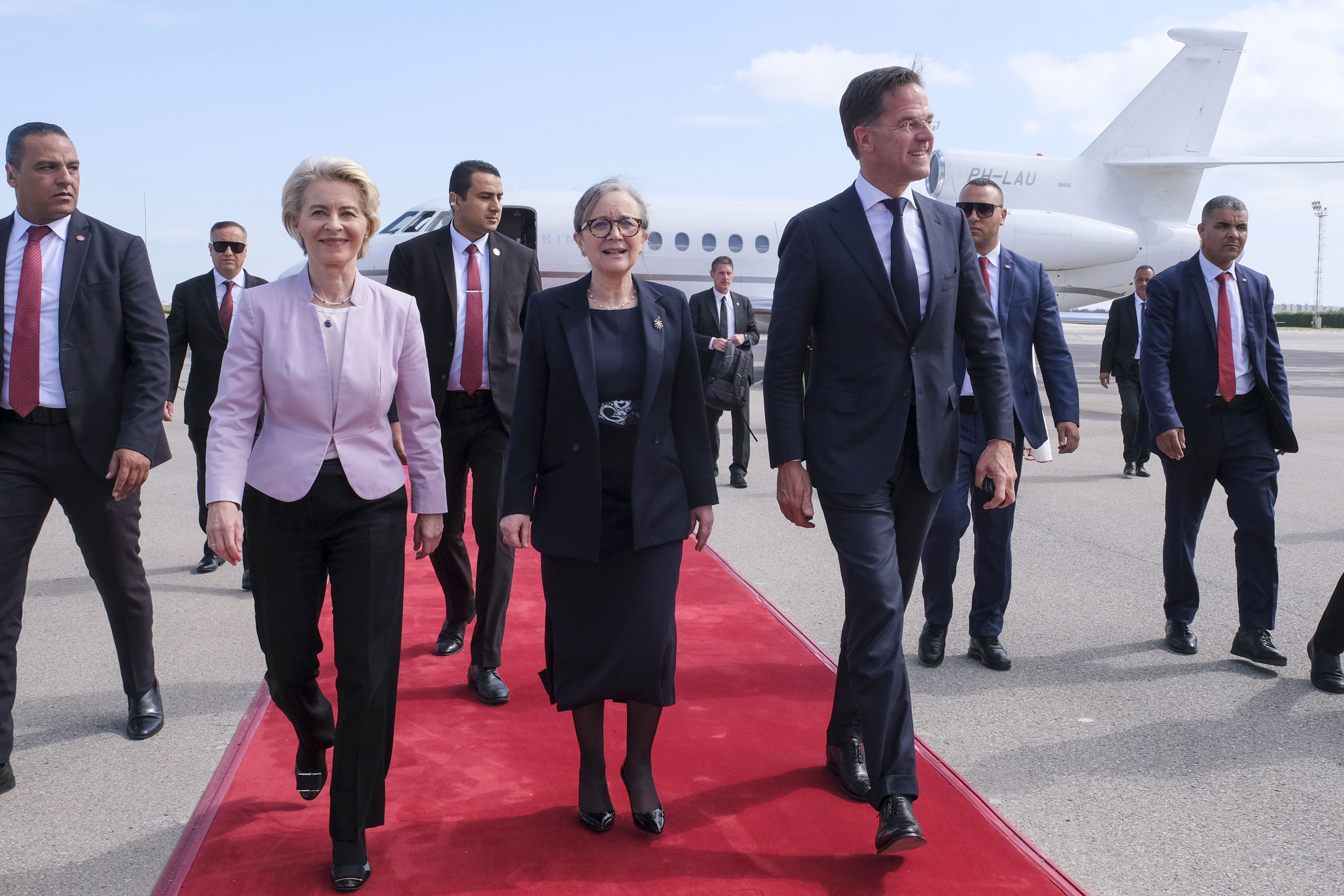
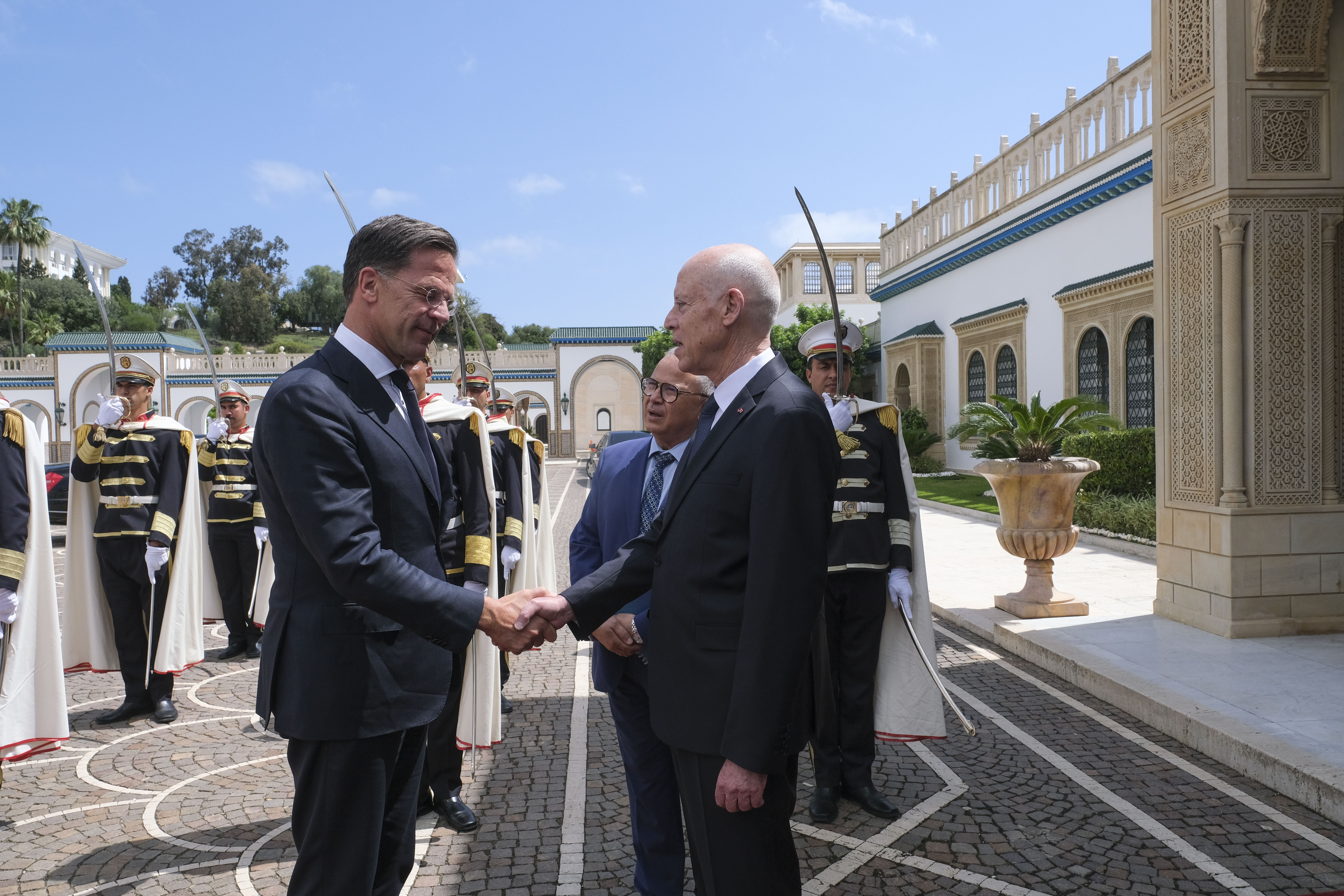
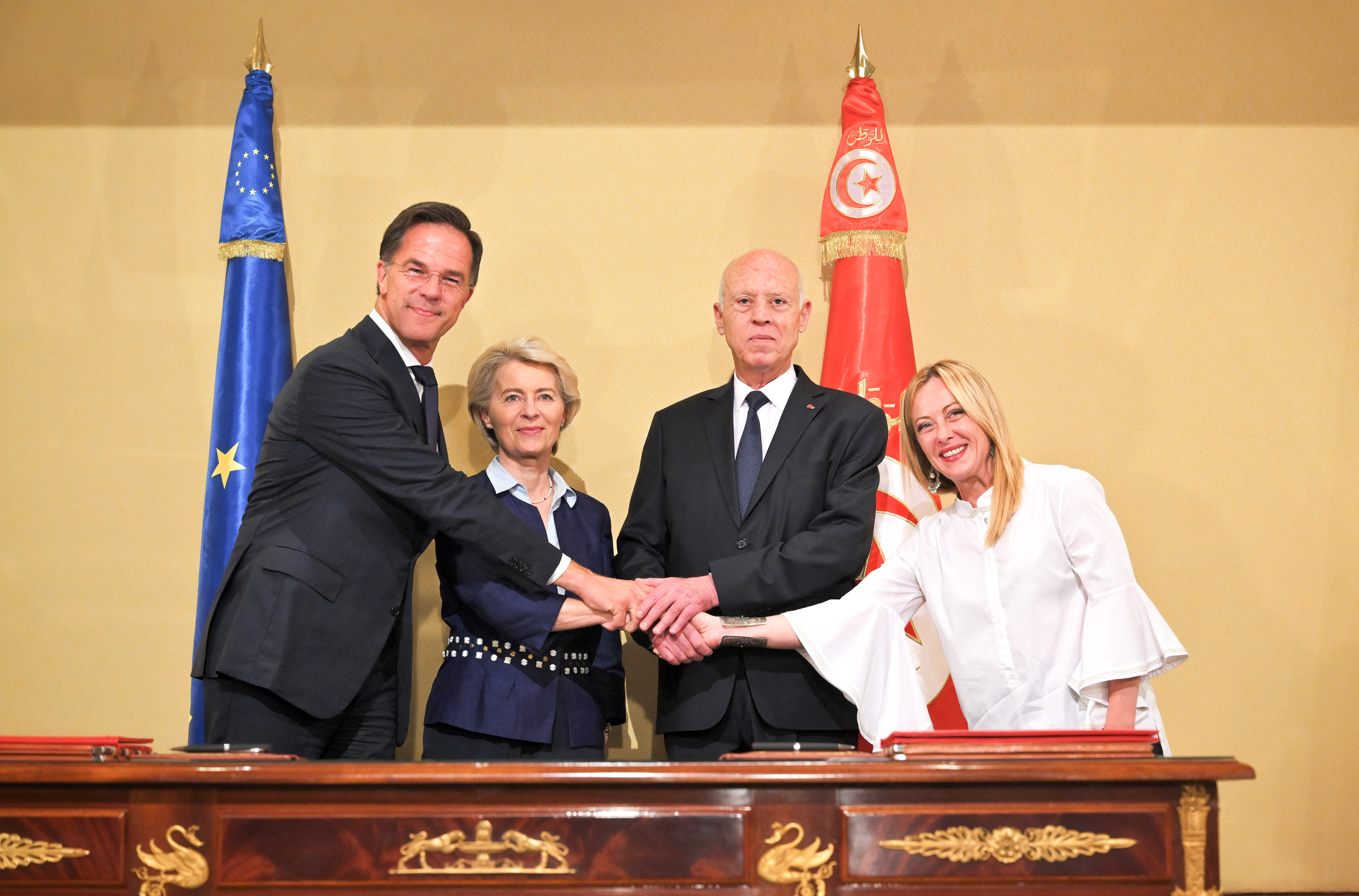
Dutch PM Mark Rutte, President of the European Commission Ursula von der Leyen and Italian PM Giorgia Meloni visited Tunisian president Kais Saied to negotiate and close a migration deal. (June and July 2023).
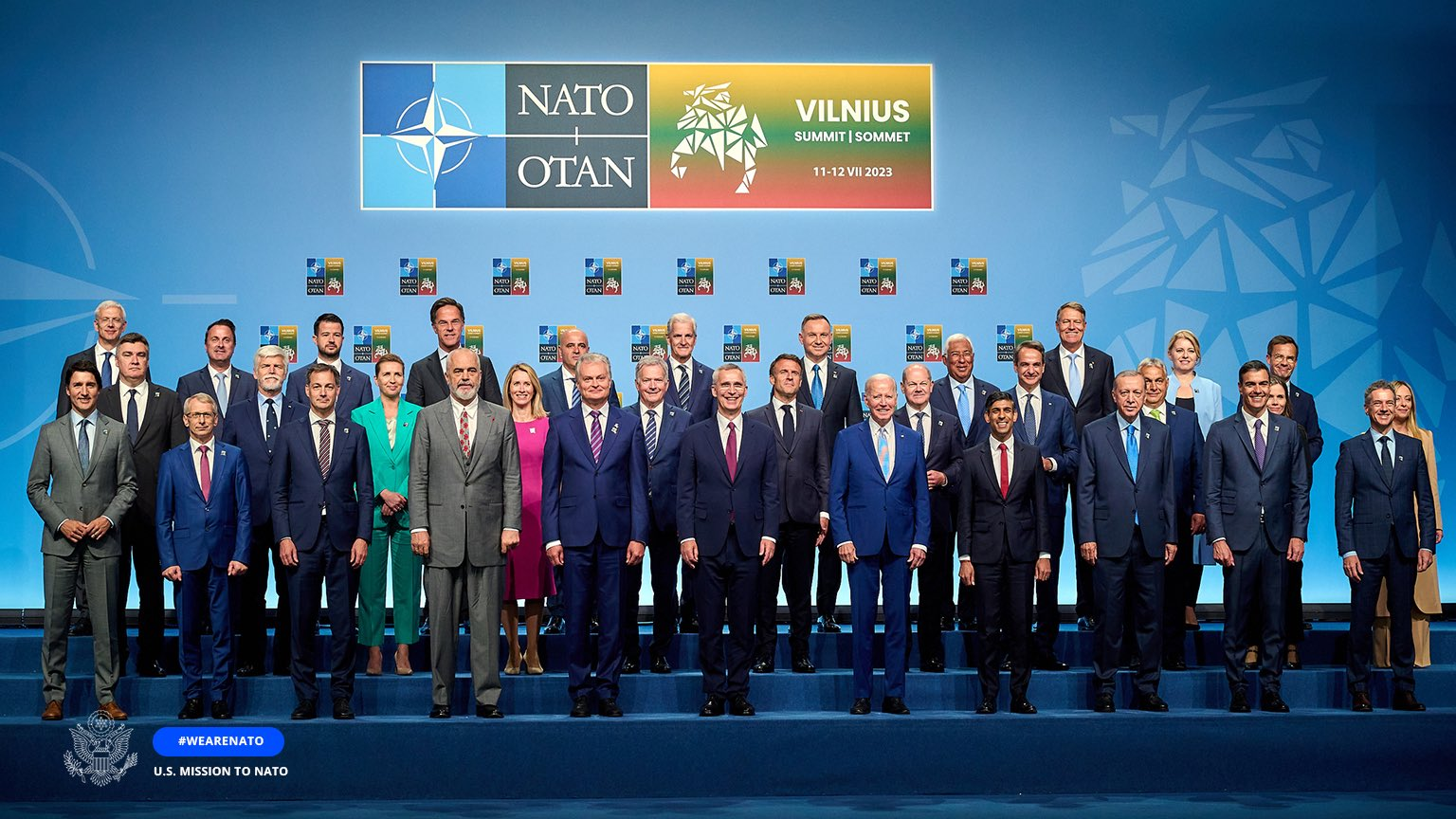
Family photo of the 2023 Vilnius NATO Summit. (July 2023).

| Country | Areas visited | Date(s) | Details |
|---|---|---|---|
| United States | Washington, D.C. | 17 January | Rutte and Minister of Foreign Affairs Hoekstra meet with President Joe Biden. |
| Switzerland | Davos | 18–19 January | Rutte attends the World Economic Forum. |
| Belgium | Brussels | 24 January | Rutte meets with Belgian prime minister Alexander De Croo and the president of the European Commission Ursula von der Leyen in preparation of the European Council meeting in February. |
| Austria | Vienna | 26 January | Rutte meets Austrian chancellor Karl Nehammer in preparation of the European Council meeting in February. |
| Belgium | Brussels | 9 February | Rutte attends the EU council meeting. |
| Ukraine | Kyiv | 17 February | Rutte meets with Ukrainian president Volodymyr Zelenskyy in light of the Russo-Ukrainian War. Rutte was accompanied by minister Liesje Schreinemacher. |
| Italy | Rome | 8 March | Rutte meets with Italian prime minister Giorgia Meloni. |
| Belgium | Brussels | 23–24 March | Rutte attends the European Council meeting. |
| Belgium | Ostend | 24 April | Rutte attends the North Sea Summit 2023. |
| Brazil | São Paulo, Brasília & Pecém | 8–10 May | Rutte accompanied a trade mission to the country, and met with President Lula da Silva. |
| Iceland | Reykjavík | 16–17 May | Rutte attended the Reykjavík Summit of the Council of Europe. |
| Moldova | Chișinău | 2–3 June | Rutte attends the second European Political Community meeting. |
| Tunisia | Tunis | 11 June | Rutte, the president of the European Commission von der Leyen and Italian prime minister Meloni visit Tunisian president Kais Saied and Prime Minister Najla Bouden. |
| Namibia | Windhoek | 19 June | Rutte and Danish prime minister Mette Frederiksen met with Namibian president Hage Geingob. Both countries led a trade mission aimed at building green hydrogen supply chains to Europe. |
| South Africa | Pretoria | 20 June | Rutte and Danish prime minister Mette Frederiksen met with South African president Cyril Ramaphosa. Both countries led a trade mission aimed at building green hydrogen supply chains to Europe. Furthermore the African peace plan initiative to end to ongoing war in Ukraine was discussed. |
| Morocco | Rabat | 21 June | Rutte met with Moroccan Prime Minister Aziz Akhannouch. They discussed migration, the Russo-Ukrainian war and the export of green hydrogen from Morocco to the Netherlands. |
| Belgium | Brussels | 29 - 30 June | Rutte attended the European Council meeting. |
| Serbia | Belgrade | 3 July | Rutte visits Serbian prime minister Aleksandar Vučić together with Luxembourgish prime minister Xavier Bettel in light of the increasing tensions between Serbia and Kosovo |
| Kosovo | Pristina | 4 July | Rutte visits Kosovan president Vjosa Osmani and Kosovan prime minister Albin Kurti together with Luxembourgish prime minister Xavier Bettel in light of the increasing tensions between Serbia and Kosovo |
| Lithuania | Vilnius | 11–12 July | Rutte attended the 33rd NATO summit. |
| Tunisia | Tunis | 16 July | Rutte, the president of the European Commission von der Leyen and Italian prime minister Meloni visit Tunisian president Kais Saied. |
| Belgium | Brussels | 17-18 July | Rutte attends the EU-CELAC Summit. |
| India | New Delhi, Bangalore | 9-11 September | Rutte attended the 2023 G20 New Delhi summit. |
| United States | New York | 22 September | Rutte attended the United Nations General Assembly. |
| United Arab Emirates | Abu Dhabi | 26 September | Rutte met with Sheikh Mohamed bin Zayed Al Nahyan. |
| Spain | Granada | 5–6 October | Rutte attended the 3rd European Political Community Summit. |
| Poland | Sobibór | 12 October | Rutte attended the annual commemoration of the uprising that took place in the extermination camp Sobibór in 1943. |
| Ukraine | Odesa | 13 October | Rutte visited President Zelensky to make a statement that the current escalation of the Gaza war does not distract from the war in Ukraine. |
| Albania | Tirana | 16 October | Rutte attended the Berlin Process Summit. |
| Israel | Tel Aviv | 23 October | Rutte visited Israeli prime minister Benjamin Netanyahu to discuss the latest developments during the Gaza war. |
| Palestine | Ramallah | 23 October | Rutte visited the president of the Palestinian Authority Mahmoud Abbas to discuss the latest developments during the Gaza war. |
| Belgium | Brussels | 26-27 October | Rutte attended the European Council meeting. |
| Malaysia | Kuala Lumpur | 1 November | Rutte accompanied a trade mission to Malaysia and met with Malaysian prime minister Anwar Ibrahim. |
| Vietnam | Hanoi | 2 November | Rutte accompanied a trade mission to Vietnam and met with Vietnamese Prime Minister Pham Minh Chinh. |
| Qatar | Doha | 8 November | Rutte met with Qatari Sheikh Tamim Bin Hamad Al Thani to discuss the latest developments of the Gaza war. |
| Israel | Jerusalem | 8 November | Rutte visited Israeli prime minister Benjamin Netanyahu to discuss the latest developments during the Gaza war. |
| Belgium | Brussels | 10 November | Rutte met with the president of the European Commission Ursula von der Leyen. |
| Belgium | Brussels | 15 November | Rutte met with the secretary general of NATO Jens Stoltenberg. |
| Germany | Berlin | 20 November | Rutte attended a dialogue session where leaders of African countries and G20 partners met to tighten cooperation. |
| France | Paris | 28 November | Rutte met with his European counterparts in preparation of the upcoming European Council meeting. |
| United Arab Emirates | Dubai | 30 November - 1 December | Rutte attended COP28. |
| United States | Phoenix & San Francisco | 4-6 December | Rutte accompanied a trade mission to the United States. |
| United Kingdom | London | 7 December | Rutte met with British prime minister Rishi Sunak. |
| Germany | Berlin | 11 December | Rutte met with German chancellor Olaf Scholz. |
| Belgium | Brussels | 14-15 December | Rutte attended the European Council meeting. |

== 2024 ==
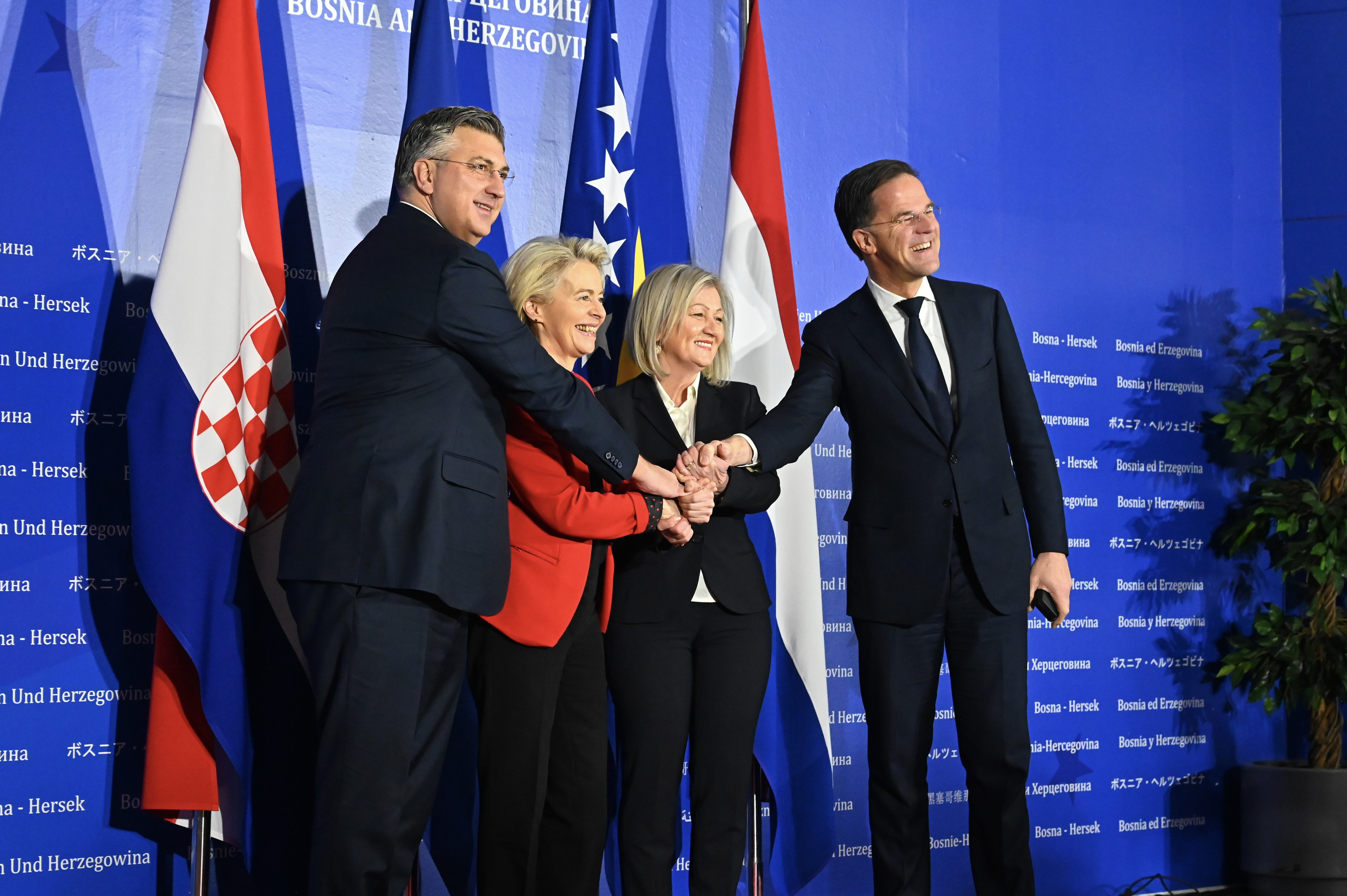
Rutte visited Bosnia and Herzegovina together with the president of the European Commission von der Leyen. Andrej Plenković, Ursula von der Leyen, Borjana Krišto, Mark Rutte, from left to right. (January 2024)
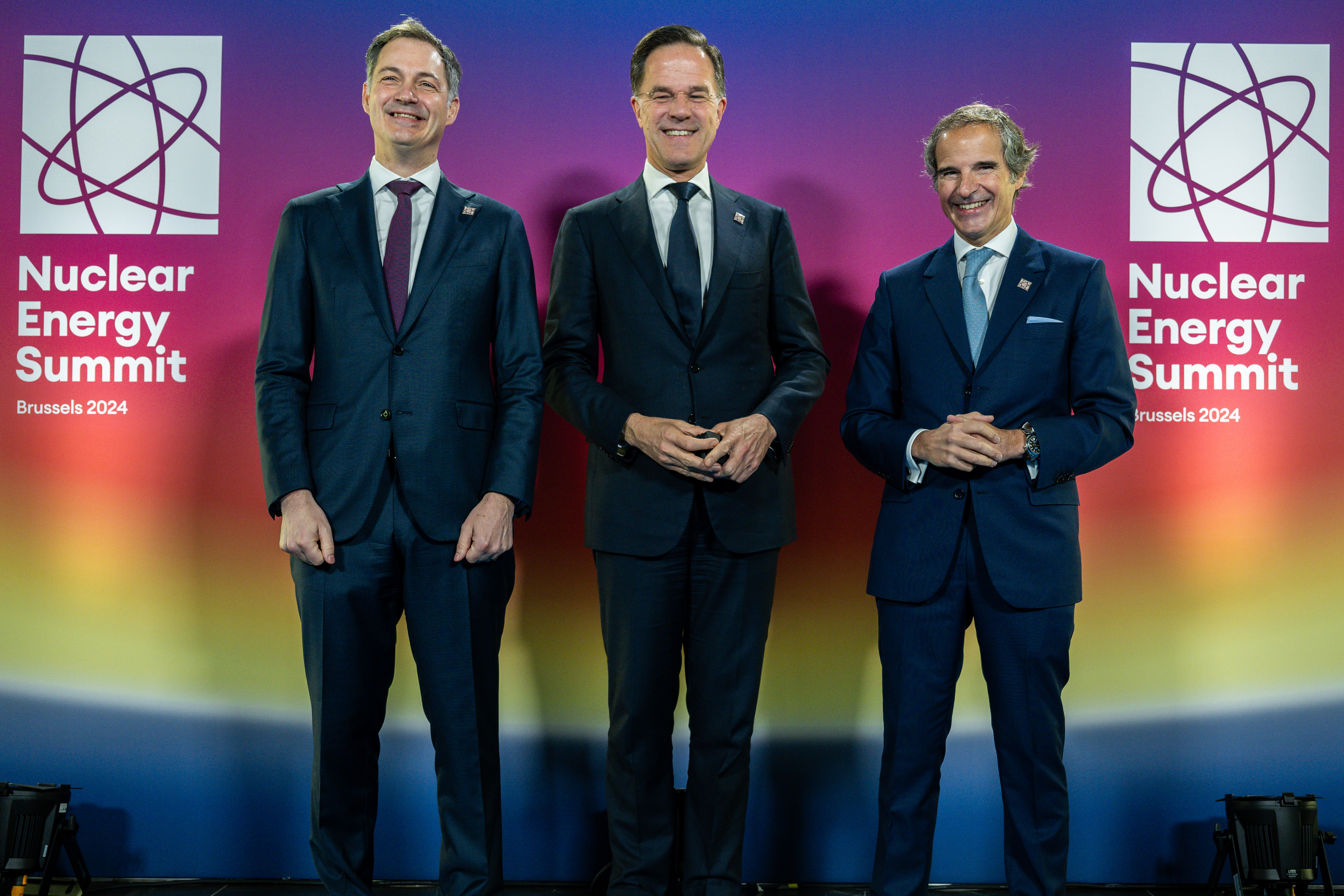
Rutte attending the Nuclear Energy Summit in Brussels. From left to right, Belgian prime minister Alexander De Croo, Mark Rutte and director general of the International Atomic Energy Agency Rafael Grossi (March 2024).

| Country | Areas visited | Date(s) | Details |
|---|---|---|---|
| France | Paris | 5 January | Rutte attended the commemoration ceremony of Jacques Delors. |
| Switzerland | Davos | 16-17 January | Rutte attended the World Economic Forum. |
| Bosnia and Herzegovina | Srebrenica, Sarajevo | 22-23 January | Rutte visited the Srebrenica Memorial Centre and Dutch troops at EUFOR Althea, and met with High Representative for Bosnia and Herzegovina Christian Schmidt (politician) and Croatian Prime Minister Andrej Plenković. |
| Croatia | Zagreb | 23 January | Rutte met with Croatian prime minister Andrej Plenković. |
| Belgium | Brussels | 31 January-1 February | Rutte attended the commemoration ceremony of Jacques Delors and an informal European Council meeting. |
| Israel | Jerusalem | 12 February | Rutte met with Israeli prime minister Benjamin Netanyahu and minister of Defense Benny Gantz to discuss the latest developments revolving around the Gaza war. |
| Palestine | Jerusalem | 12 February | Rutte met with Palestinian prime minister Mohammad Shtayyeh to discuss the latest developments revolving around the Gaza war. |
| Saudi Arabia | Riyadh | 13 February | Rutte met with Saudi crown prince Mohamed bin Salman to discuss the latest developments revolving around the Gaza war. |
| Germany | Munich | 16-17 February | Rutte attended the 2024 Munich Security Conference. |
| France | Paris | 26 February | Rutte attended an international gathering on the continued support for Ukraine. |
| Ukraine | Kharkiv | 1 March | Rutte met with Ukrainian president Zelenskyy. |
| Israel | Jerusalem | 13 March | Rutte met with Israeli prime minister Benjamin Netanyahu to discuss the Gaza war. |
| Egypt | Cairo | 13 March | Rutte met with Egyptian president al-Sisi to discuss the Gaza war. |
| Germany | Leipzig | 20 March | Rutte attends the Leipziger Buchmesse as honorary guest. |
| Belgium | Brussels | 21-22 March | Rutte attends the Nuclear Energy Summit and participates in the European Council meeting. |
| China | Beijing | 26-27 March | Rutte meets with Chinese president Xi Jinping. |
| Lithuania | Rukla, Vilnius | 2 April | Prime Minister Rutte visited the Dutch military personnel participating in NATO forces, a meeting with President Nausėda and a European working dinner at the invitation of the president of the European Council, Charles Michel. |
| Belgium | Brussels | 17-18 April | Rutte attended an extraordinary European Council meeting. |
| Germany | Berlin | 11–12 June | Rutte attended Ukraine Recovery Conference. |
| Finland | Helsinki | 13 June | Rutte meets with Finnish president Alexander Stub. |
| Switzerland | Lucerne | 15-16 June | Rutte attended the June 2024 Ukraine peace summit, interpreting Putin's proposal for peace talks near the end of this summit as a sign of panic. |
| Belgium | Brussels | 17 June | Rutte attended the informal European Council summit. |
| Belgium | Brussels | 27–28 June | Rutte attended the European Council summit. |

== Multilateral meetings ==
Mark Rutte participated in the following summits during his premiership:

| Group | Year | | | | | | | | | | | | | | |
| Group | 2010 | 2011 | 2012 | 2013 | 2014 | 2015 | 2016 | 2017 | 2018 | 2019 | 2020 | 2021 | 2022 | 2023 | 2024 |
|---|---|---|---|---|---|---|---|---|---|---|---|---|---|---|---|
| UNGA | | 22 September, (United States) New York City | 26 September, (United States) New York City | 27 September, (United States) New York City | 23–27 September, (United States) New York City | 25–30 September, (United States) New York City | 19–20 September, (United States) New York City | 19–20 September, (United States) New York City | 25–27 September, (United States) New York City | 23–25 September, (United States) New York City | 26 September, (videoconference) (United States) New York City | 24 September, (United States) New York City | 23 September, (United States) New York City | 22 September, (United States) New York City | |
| ASEM | | None | 5–6 November, (Laos) Vientiane | None | 16–17 October, (Italy) Milan | None | 15–16 July, (Mongolia) Ulaanbaatar | None | 18–19 October, (Belgium) Brussels | None | | 26 November, (videoconference) (Cambodia) Phnom Penh | None | | |
| G20 | Not Invited | | | | | | | 7–8 July (Germany) Hamburg | 30 November – 1 December (Argentina) Buenos Aires | 28–29 June (Japan) Osaka | Not Invited | 30–31 October (Italy) Rome | 15–16 November (Indonesia) Bali | 9–10 September (India) New Delhi | |
| NATO | 19–20 November (Portugal) Lisbon | none | 20–21 May (United States) Chicago | none | 4–5 September, (United Kingdom) Newport | None | 8–9 July, (Poland) Warsaw | 25 May, (Belgium) Brussels | 11–12 July, (Belgium) Brussels | 3–4 December, (United Kingdom) Watford | None | 14 June, (Belgium) Brussels | 24 March, (Belgium) Brussels | 11–12 July, (Lithuania) Vilnius | |
| NATO | 19–20 November (Portugal) Lisbon | none | 20–21 May (United States) Chicago | none | 4–5 September, (United Kingdom) Newport | None | 8–9 July, (Poland) Warsaw | 25 May, (Belgium) Brussels | 11–12 July, (Belgium) Brussels | 3–4 December, (United Kingdom) Watford | None | 14 June, (Belgium) Brussels | 28–30 June, (Spain) Madrid | 11–12 July, (Lithuania) Vilnius | |
| NSS | | none | 26–27 March, (South Korea) Seoul | none | 24–25 March, (Netherlands) The Hague | None | 31 March – 1 April, (United States) Washington, D.C. | None | | | | | | | |
| EU–CELAC | none | | | 26–27 January, (Chile) Santiago | None | 10 June, (Belgium) Brussels | None | 26–27 October, (El Salvador) San Salvador | None | | | | | 17–18 July, (Belgium) Brussels | None |
| JEF | Didn't exist | | | | None | | | | | | | | 14–15 March (United Kingdom) London | 12–13 October (Sweden) Visby | |
| JEF | Didn't exist | | | | None | | | | | | | | 19 December (Latvia) Riga | 12–13 October (Sweden) Visby | |
| EPC | Didn't exist | | | | | | | | | | | | 6 October, (Czech Republic) Prague | 1 June, (Moldova) Bulboaca | |
| EPC | Didn't exist | | | | | | | | | | | | 6 October, (Czech Republic) Prague | 5 October, (Spain) Granada | |
| Others | None | | | | | UNCCC; 30 November, (France) Paris | None | | UNCCC; 3 December, (Poland) Katowice | UNCCC; 2 December, (Spain) Madrid | None | UNCCC; 1–2 November, (United Kingdom) Glasgow | North Sea Summit; 18 May, (Denmark) Esbjerg | North Sea Summit; 24 April, (Belgium) Ostend | Ukraine Recovery Conference; 11–12 June, (Germany) Berlin |
| Others | None | | | | | UNCCC; 30 November, (France) Paris | None | | UNCCC; 3 December, (Poland) Katowice | UNCCC; 2 December, (Spain) Madrid | None | UNCCC; 1–2 November, (United Kingdom) Glasgow | UNCCC; 7 November, (Egypt) Sharm el-Sheikh | UNCCC; 30 November–1 December, (United Arab Emirates) Dubai | Global Peace Summit; 15–16 June, (Switzerland) Lucerne |
██ = Did not attend

== See also ==
- Foreign relations of the Netherlands
- List of international prime ministerial trips made by Dick Schoof, his successor
