= Teofil Noniewicz =

Lithuanian-Polish doctor (1851–1928)

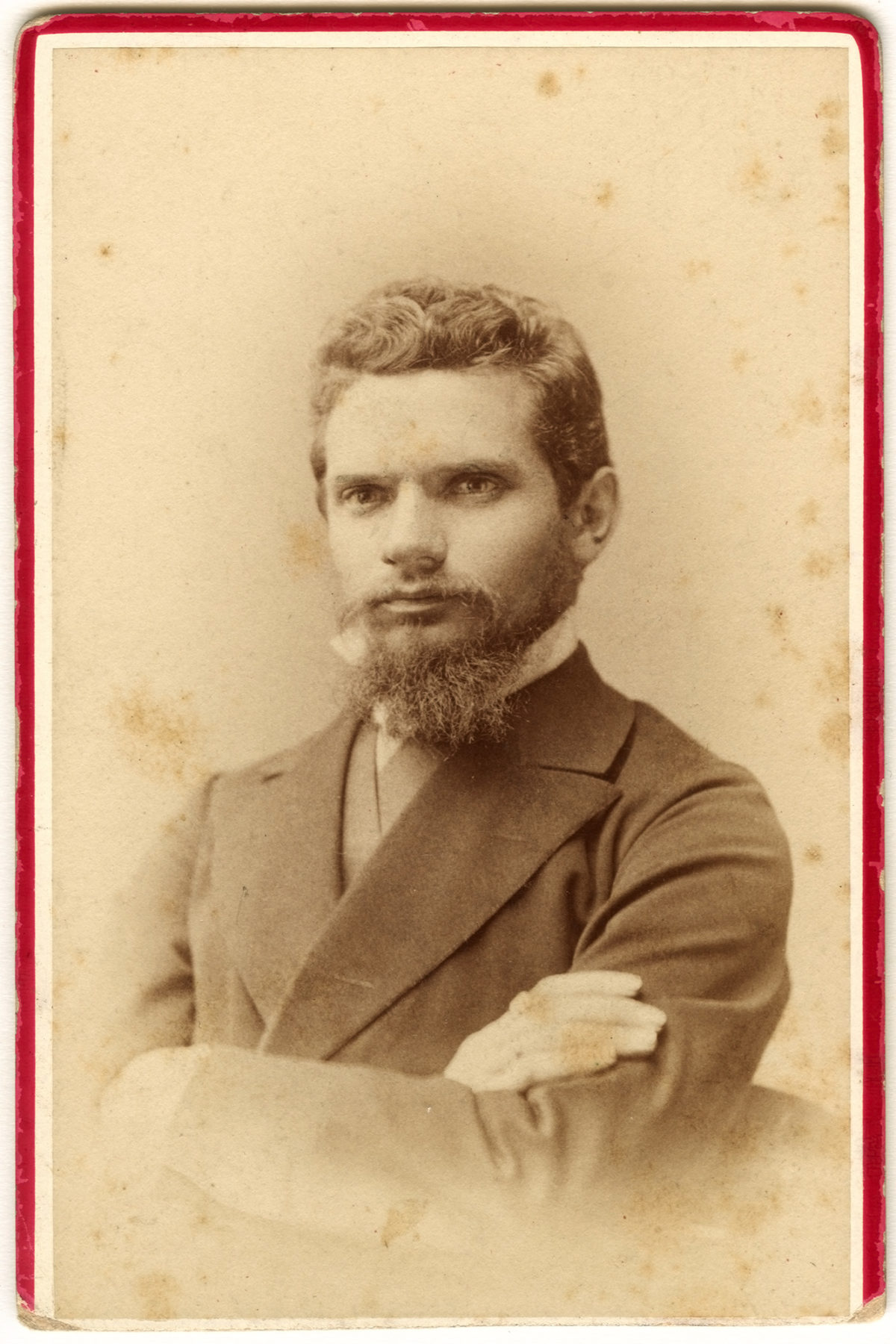
- Photograph c. 1870 (from the collection of the District Museum in Suwałki)
- Born: 27 April 1851; Antonosz, Kovno Governorate, Russian Empire
- Died: 30 September 1928 (aged 77); Suwałki, Second Polish Republic
- Resting place: Bakałarzewska Street parish cemetery
- Education: Main School of Warsaw University of Warsaw
- Occupation: Doctor
- Children: 6
- Awards: Order of Polonia Restituta

Teofil Noniewicz (27 April 1851 – 30 September 1928) was a Lithuanian-born Polish doctor and social activist.

== Biography ==
He was the son of Ignacy and Marianna, née Pavlovich. The Noniewicz family came from the Vilnius Region tracing their lineage to the Lithuanian noble Prus family. They moved to Suwałki in the late 1850s, possibly in connection with the family's difficult material situation after Ignacy's death. Maria and Ignacy's older sons, Edward and Kallistas, were already working as doctors in Suwałki.

In Suwałki, Teofil began his education at the local secondary school. After passing his secondary school-leaving examinations, he enrolled at the Faculty of Medicine of the Main School of Warsaw in 1868. As a result of repressions after the January Uprising, the school was closed down in November 1869 and replaced by the Warsaw University (then called the Imperial Warsaw University). In December 1874, he received his medical degree from the same university. Noniewicz practiced in the town of Augustów, then in Suwałki, where he settled permanently. In April 1876, he took up the post of doctor at St Peter and Paul's Hospital. From 1876 to 1879, he was a military physician in the 3rd Horse Artillery Battery.

After leaving the army, he worked at the St Peter and Paul City Hospital in Suwałki, initially as second doctor, then from 1892 to 1915 as first (chief) doctor. From 1883 to 1892, he was a doctor at the Jewish hospital. After the outbreak of the First World War, he and the Suwałki hospital were evacuated to Russia, where he was senior physician at the military hospital in Gomel, and in 1918 he acted as physician to the Central Civic Committee in Babruysk. On his return to Suwałki, he continued to work at St Peter and Paul's Hospital.

== Public work ==
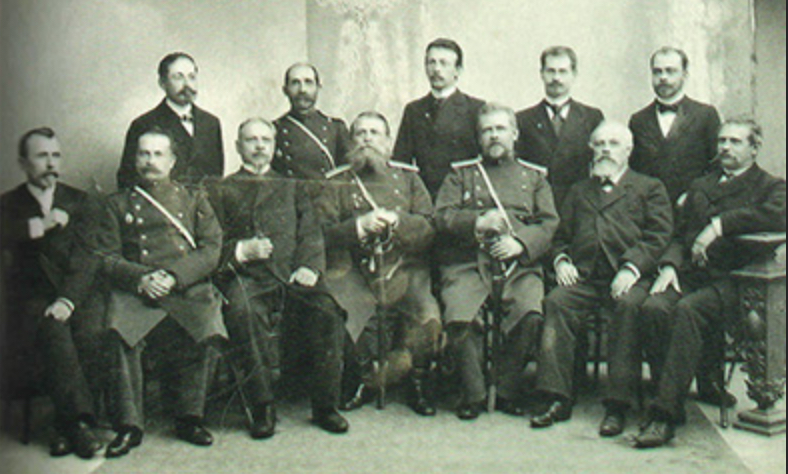
A group of Suwałki doctors and pharmacists from around 1910, first from the right is Teofil Noniewicz

Tedofil Noniewicz worked socially, he was one of the co-founders of the Suwałki Volunteer Fire Brigade Association, co-founder and for many years vice-president of the Christian Charity Association, and a member of the Suwałki branch of the Polish Landscape Society. He was also active in the Mutual Credit Society. He was vice-president of the Society of Physicians of the Suwałki Governorate and co-founder of the Scientific and Medical Society of the Suwałki region. From November 1918, he was active in the Provisional Civic Council of the Suwałki District, and also supported the formation of the 1st Suwałki Rifle Regiment (later the 41st Suwałki Infantry Regiment named after Marshal Józef Piłsudski). He was elected chairman of the first Suwałki Town Council, and after the end of the First World War served as a juror of the District Court. He was president and co-founder of the Suwałki Scientific Reading Room and a member of the board of the Riflemen's Association. He performed on the local amateur theatre stage, declaiming the works of the bards and contemporary Polish prose.

On 2 May 1923, he was awarded the Officer's Cross of the Order of Polonia Restituta for ‘recognition of meritorious service to the Republic of Poland in the field of national and social work’.

== Personal life and death ==
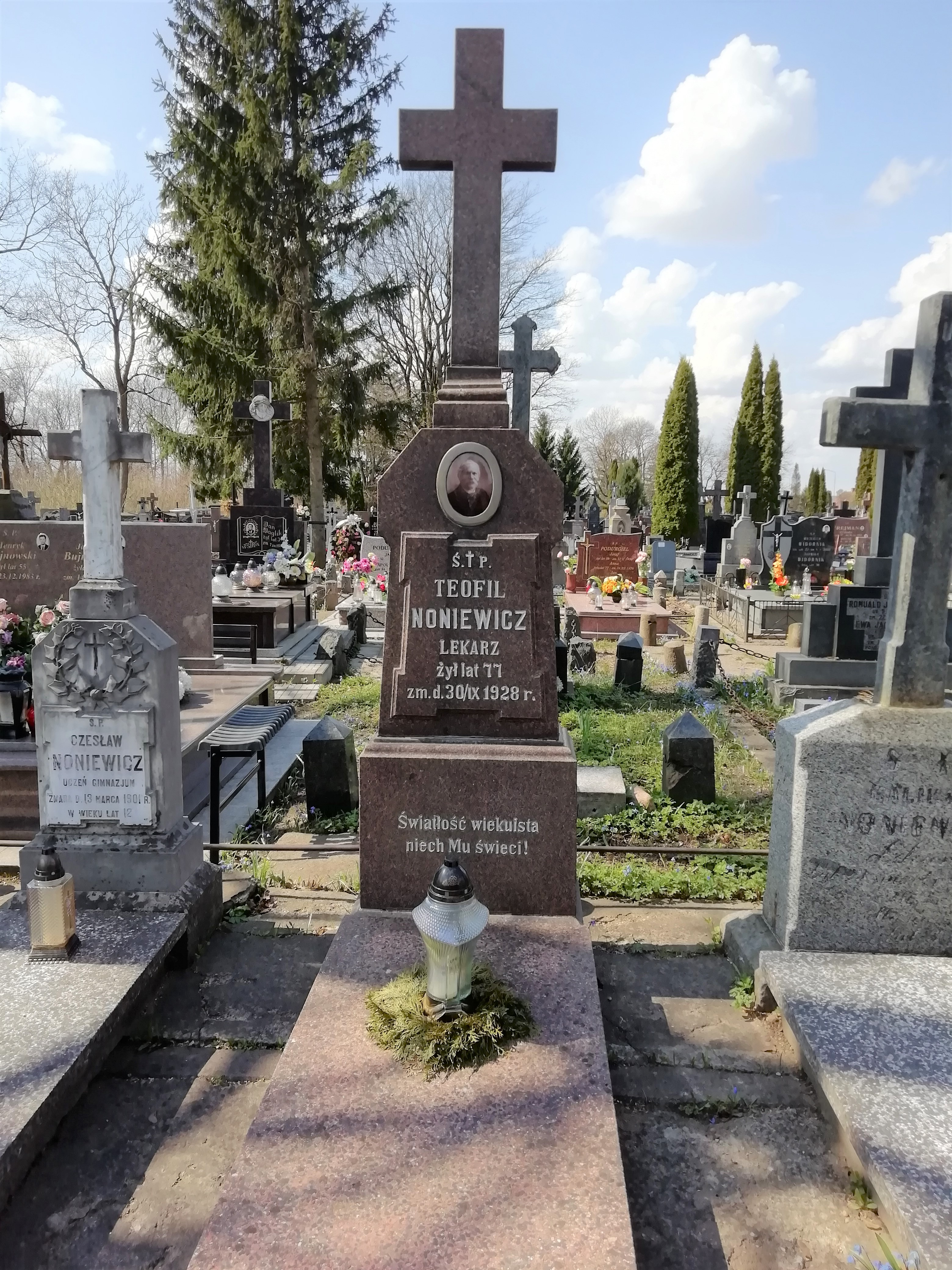
Grave of Teofil Noniewicz in the Bakałarzewska Street parish cemetery

On 11 May 1878, he married Zofia Eleonora Guziewicz. They had daughters Sylwia, Amelia, and Zofia, and sons Bogdan and Czesław.

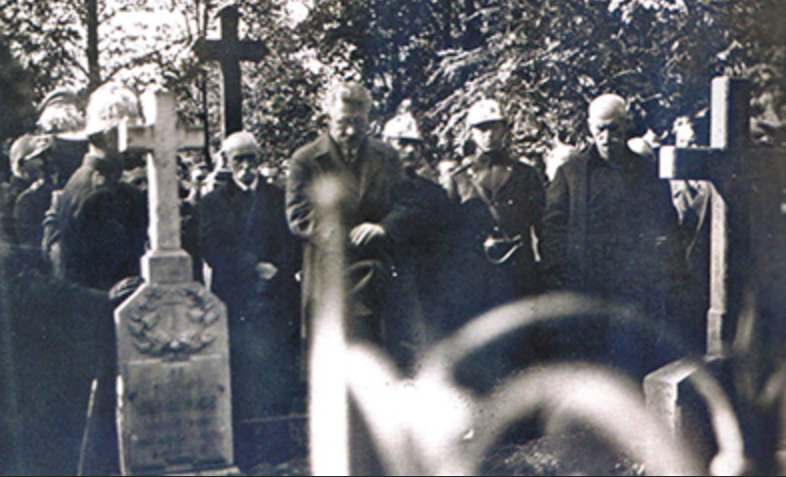
Funeral of Teofil Noniewicz

He died on 30 September 1928. The funeral ceremony was attended by representatives of the local authorities, the clergy, and a large number of Suwałki residents. He was buried in the oldest part of the cemetery, near the neo-Gothic chapel on Bakałarzewska Street. On his funeral procession he was accompanied by the honour company of the 41st Suwałki Infantry Regiment together with a military orchestra and the Fire Brigade orchestra during the procession, Suwałki mayor at the time Wawrzyniec Gałaj said:

"Dr Teofil Noniewicz was a man who broke the chains of bondage, and socially he was there wherever the duty called him. Honour to his noble ashes."

In the Suwałki cemetery on Bakałarzewska Street there are graves of the Noniewicz family, including the brothers and sister of Teofil Noniewicz, i.e. Edward, Kallistas and Justina.

== Legacy ==
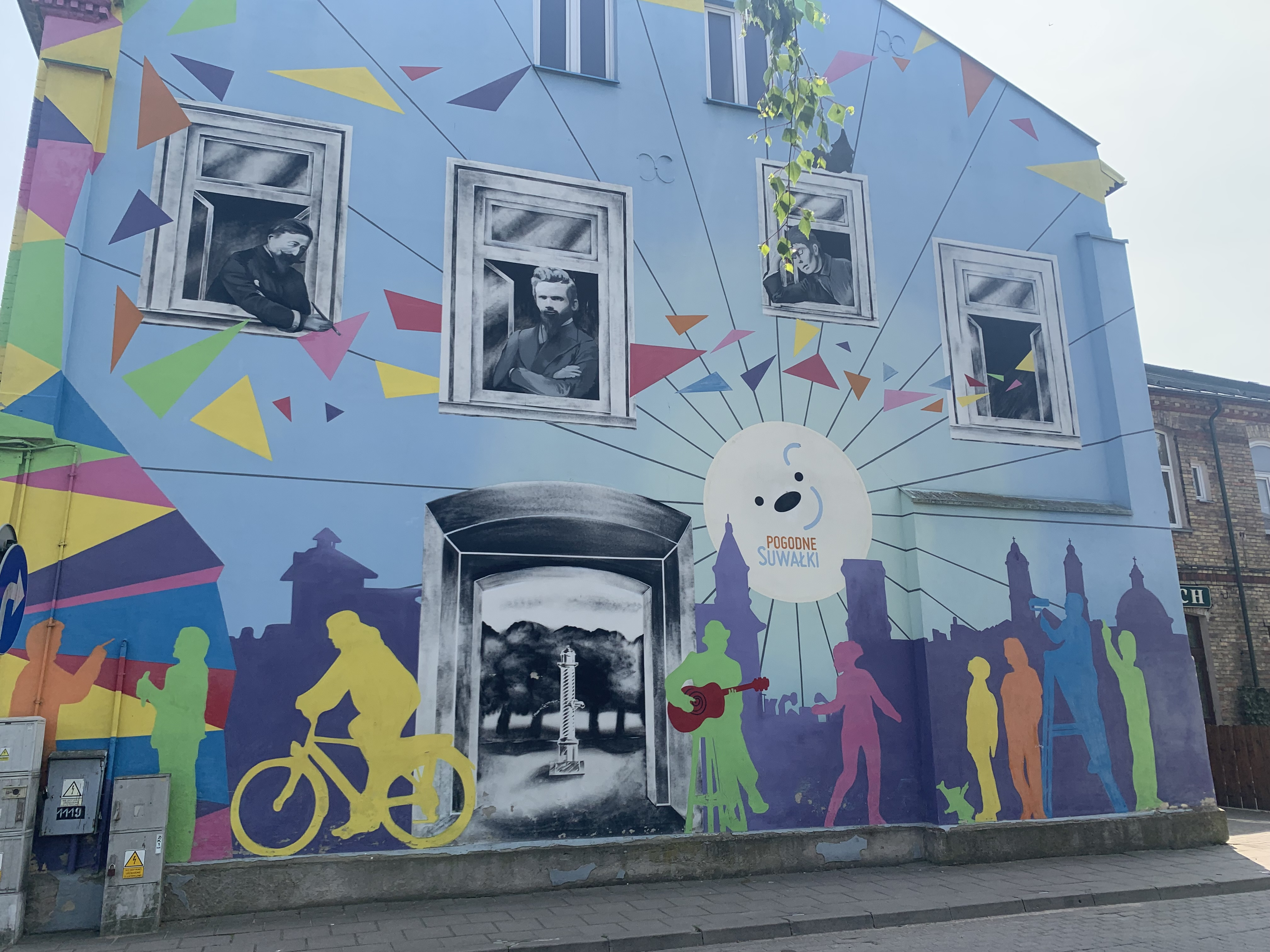
A mural in Suwałki depicting Teofil Noniewicz (centre) alongside Maria Konopnicka (right) and Alfred Kowalski (left)

- While Noniewicz was still alive (probably in 1922), one of Suwałki's streets was named after him.
- Already after Noniewicz's death, a plaque in his honour was hung in the hospital's operating theatre (destroyed during a later renovation).
- At a meeting of the Suwałki City Council on 27 January 2021, the city proclaimed 2021 as the Year of Teofil Noniewicz.

== Awards ==
Officers cross of the Order of Polonia Restituta.
