= Suwałki =

City in Podlaskie Voivodeship, Poland

- City county
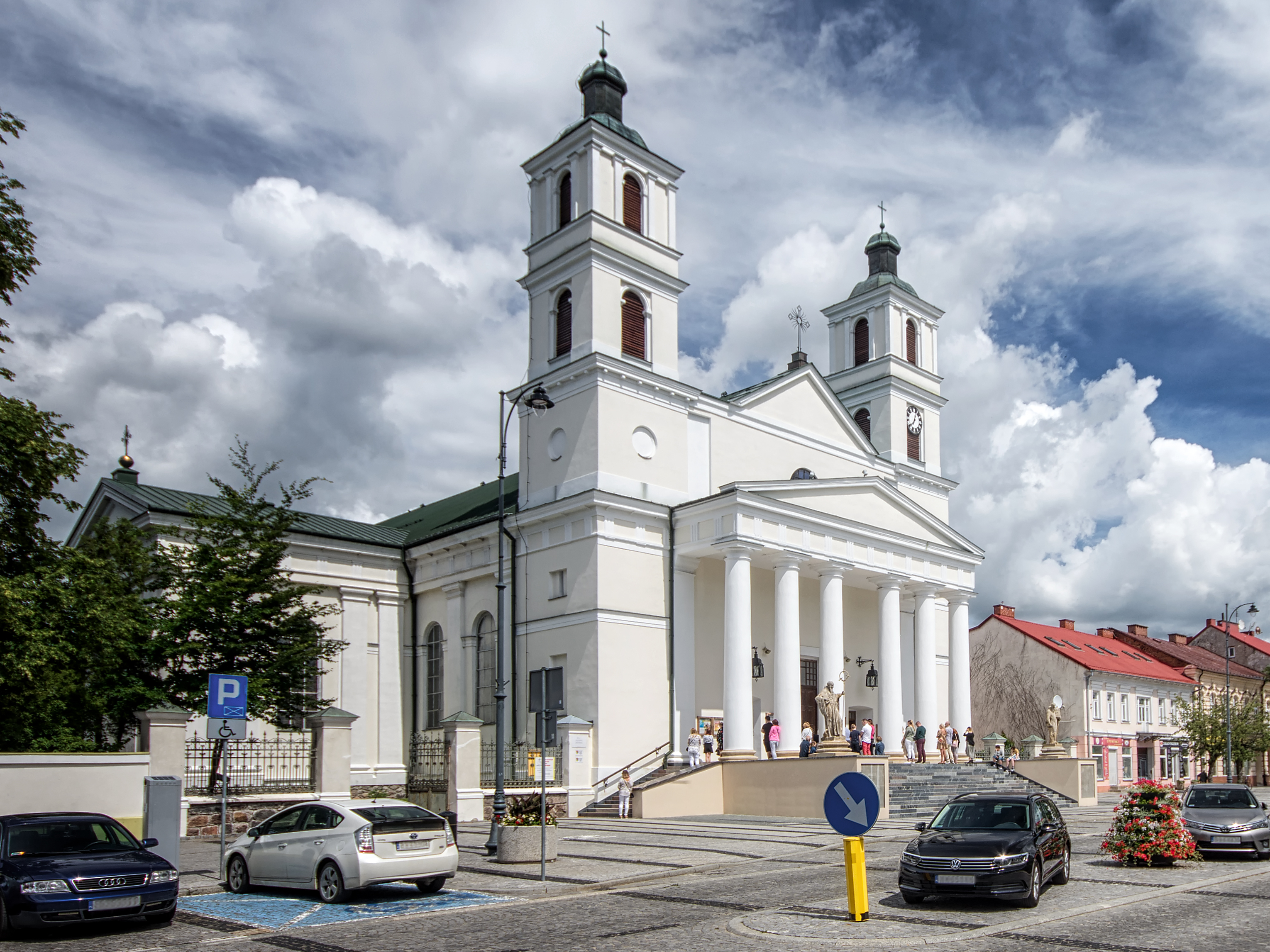
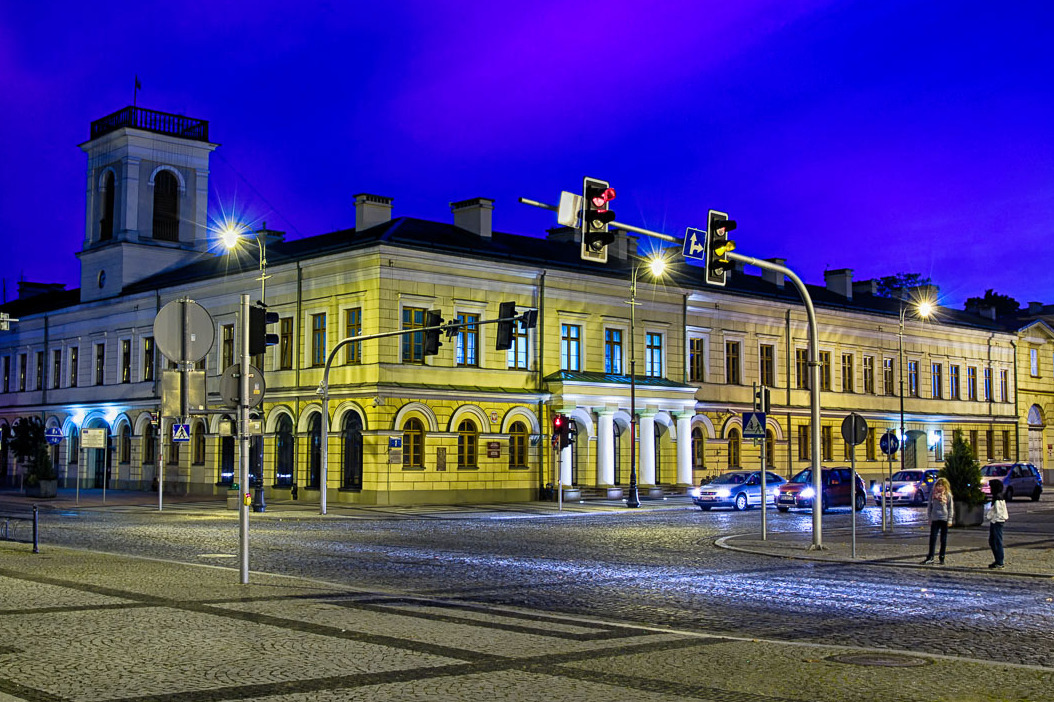
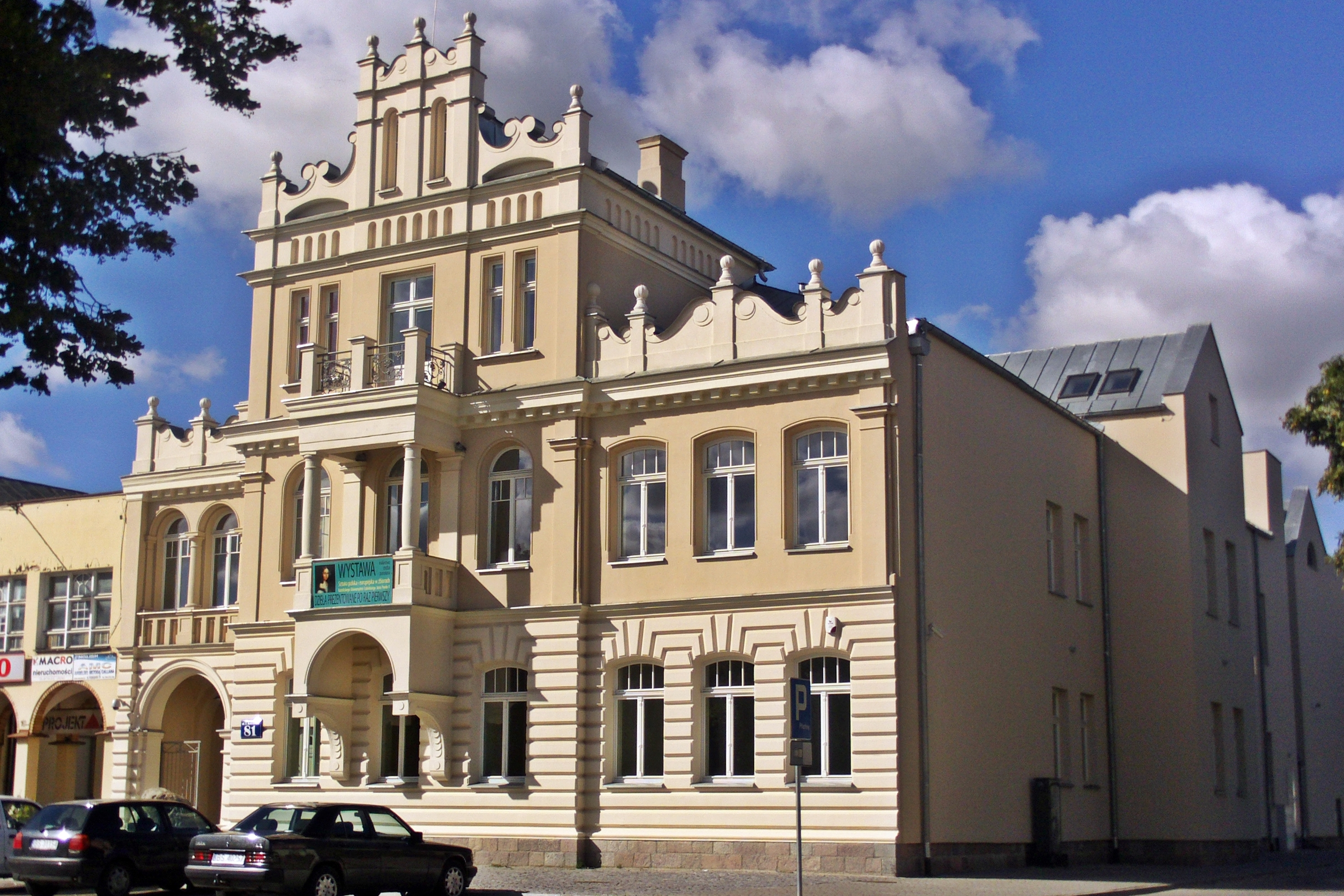
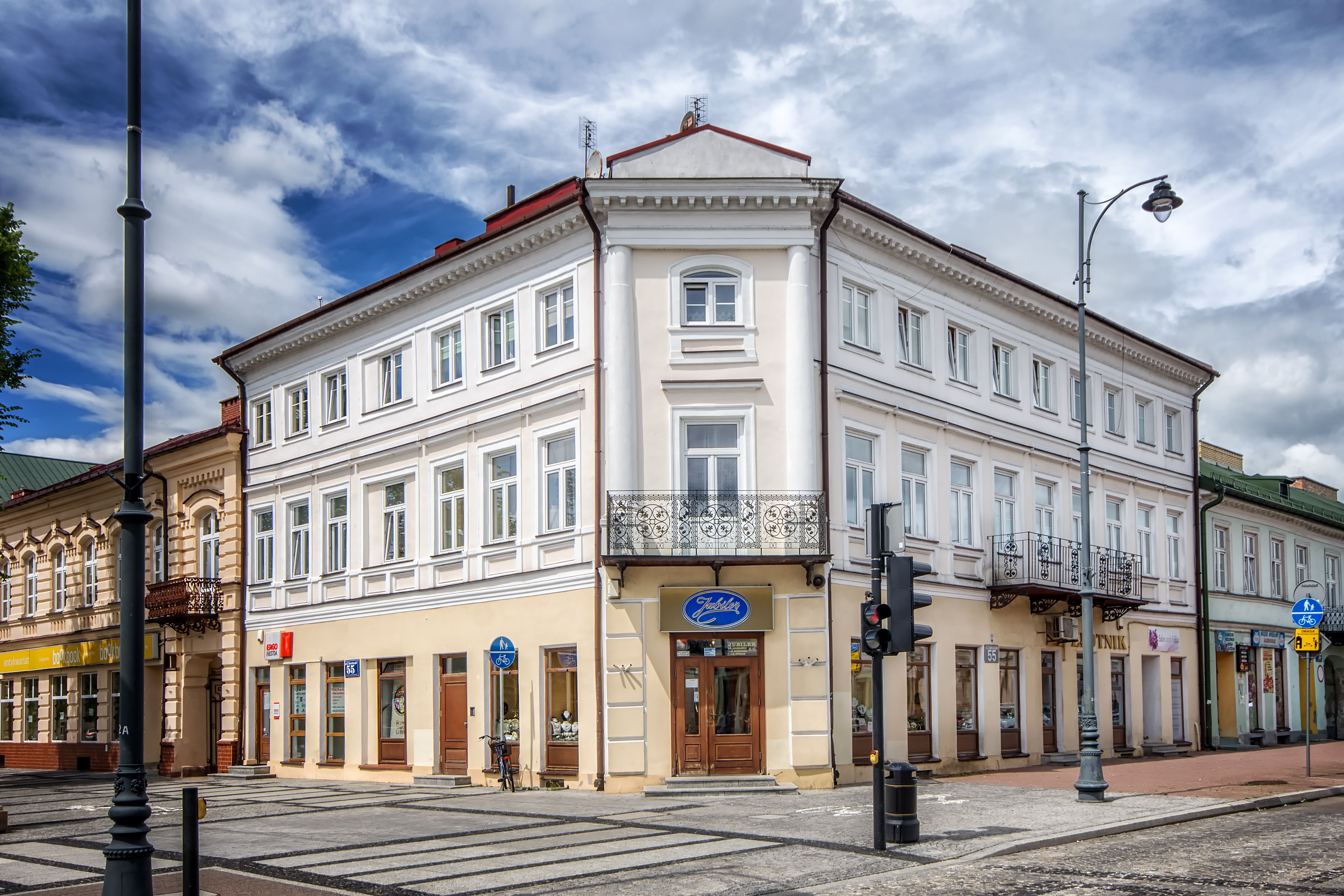
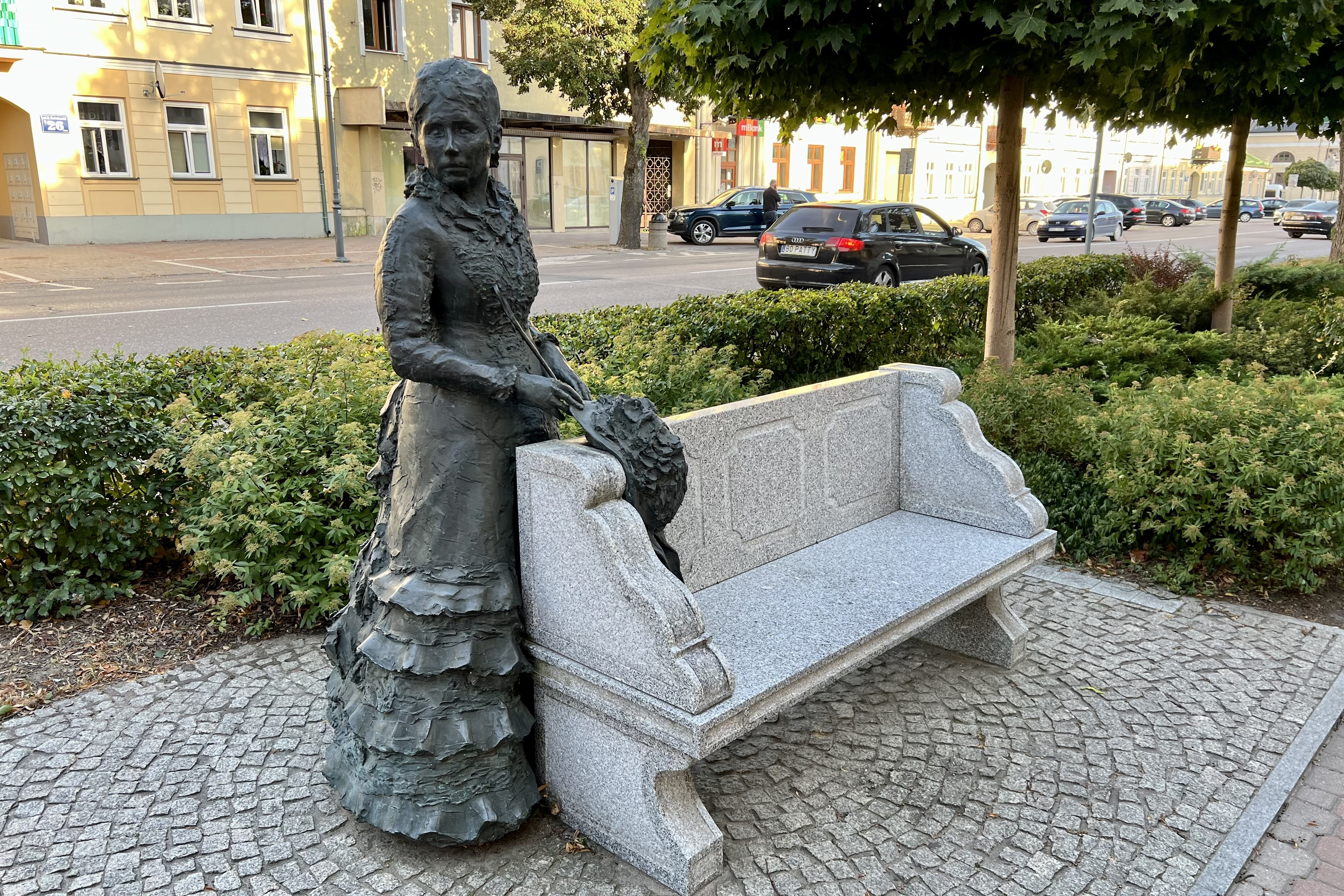
- Saint Alexander Co-Cathedral Town hall Resursa Kościuszki Street Maria Konopnicka monument

- Flag Coat of arms
- Interactive map of Suwałki
- Location within Poland
- Coordinates: 54°05′56″N 22°55′43″E
- Country: Poland
- Voivodeship: Podlaskie
- County: city county
- Established: 1690
- City rights: 1720

Government
  - City mayor: Czesław Renkiewicz

Area
  - Total: 65.24 km^{2} (25.19 sq mi)
- Elevation: 170 m (560 ft)

Population (31 December 2021)
  - Total: 69,206 ▼
  - Density: 1,061/km^{2} (2,747/sq mi)
- Time zone: UTC+1 (CET)
  - Summer (DST): UTC+2 (CEST)
- Postal code: 16-400 to 16-403
- Area code: +48 87
- Car plates: BS
- Website: http://www.um.suwalki.pl/

Suwałki (Note: Polish pronunciation: [suˈvau̯kʲi]; Lithuanian: Suvalkai; Yiddish: סואוואַלק or סוּוואַלק) is a city in northeastern Poland with a population of 69,206 (2021). It is the capital of Suwałki County and one of the most important centers of commerce in the Podlaskie Voivodeship.

A relatively young city, Suwałki is one of the largest cities and economic and cultural centers of north-eastern Poland, and the largest city and the capital of the historical Suwałki Region. The city owed its past growth to its administrative role and location on important trade routes. It escaped major destruction in each of the world wars preserving the historic city centre. It is a tourist destination thanks to favourable location near the Suwałki Landscape Park and Wigry National Park. Suwałki is located next to the strategically important Via Baltica road connecting Warsaw with Kaunas, Riga, Tallinn and Helsinki, about 30 km (19 mi) from the southwestern Lithuanian border. The Czarna Hańcza river flows through the city.

== Etymology ==
The name derives from Lithuanian su- (near) and valka (creek, marsh), with the combined meaning "place near a small river or swampy area".

== History ==
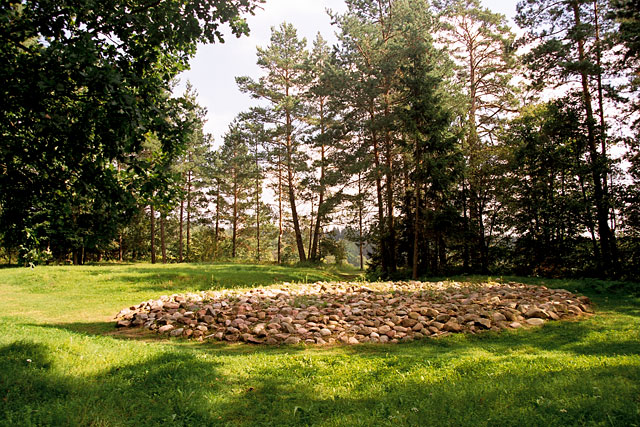
Yotvingian kurgan

The area of Suwałki had been populated by local Yotvingian and Prussian tribes since the early Middle Ages. However, with the arrival of the Teutonic Order to Yotvingia, their lands were conquered and remained largely depopulated in the following centuries.

=== 17th century ===
The village was founded by Camaldolese monks, who in 1667 were granted the area surrounding the future town by the Grand Duke of Lithuania and the King of Poland John II Casimir. Soon afterwards the monastic order built its headquarters in Wigry, where a monastery and a church were built.

The new owners of the area started rapid economic exploitation and development of the forests; they brought enough settlers (mainly from an overpopulated Masovia) to build several new villages in the area. Also, production of wood, lumber, tar and iron ore was started. The village was first mentioned in 1688; two years later it was reported to have just two houses.

=== 18th century ===
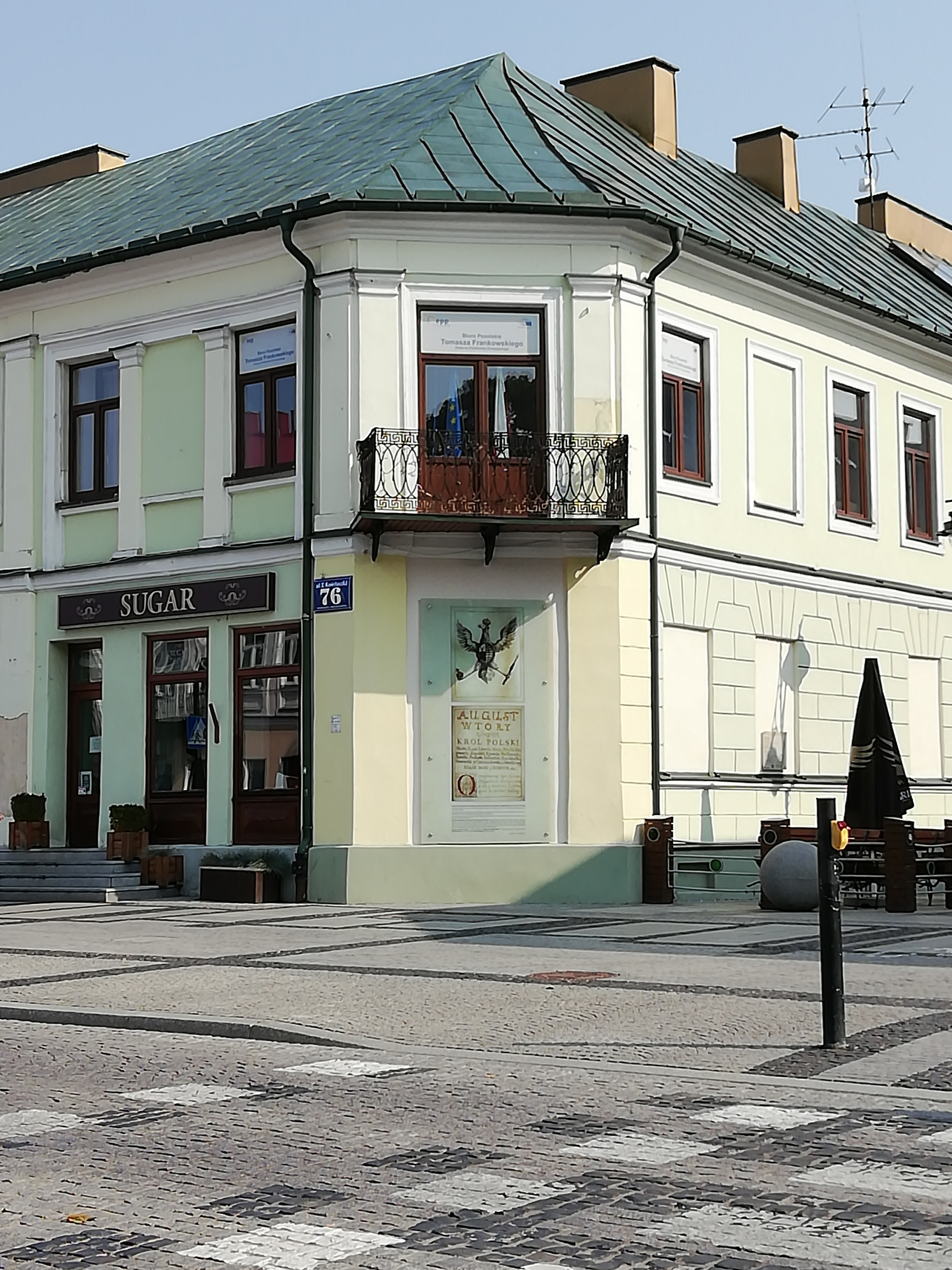
Townhouse with a plaque commemorating the granting of city rights by King Augustus II

However, the growth of the village was fast and by 1700 it was split into Lesser and Greater Suwałki. The village was located almost exactly in the center of Camaldolese estates and lay on the main trade route linking Grodno and Merkinė with Königsberg.

In 1710 King Augustus II the Strong granted the village a privilege to organize fairs and markets. Five years later, in 1715, the village was granted town rights by the grand master of the order, Ildefons. The town was divided into 300 lots for future houses and its inhabitants were granted civil rights and exempted from taxes for seven years. In addition, the town was granted 18.03 km^{2} (6.96 sq mi) of forest that was to be turned into arable land. On 2 May 1720 the town rights were approved by King August II, and the town was allowed to organize one fair a week and four markets a year. In addition, a coat of arms was approved, depicting Saint Roch and Saint Romuald.

After the Partitions of Poland in 1795, the area was annexed by Prussia. In 1796 the monastery in Wigry was dissolved and its property confiscated by the Prussian government. The following year a seat of local powiat authorities was moved to the town, as well as a military garrison. By the end of the 18th century, Suwałki had 1,184 inhabitants and 216 houses. A large part of the population was Jewish.

=== 19th century ===
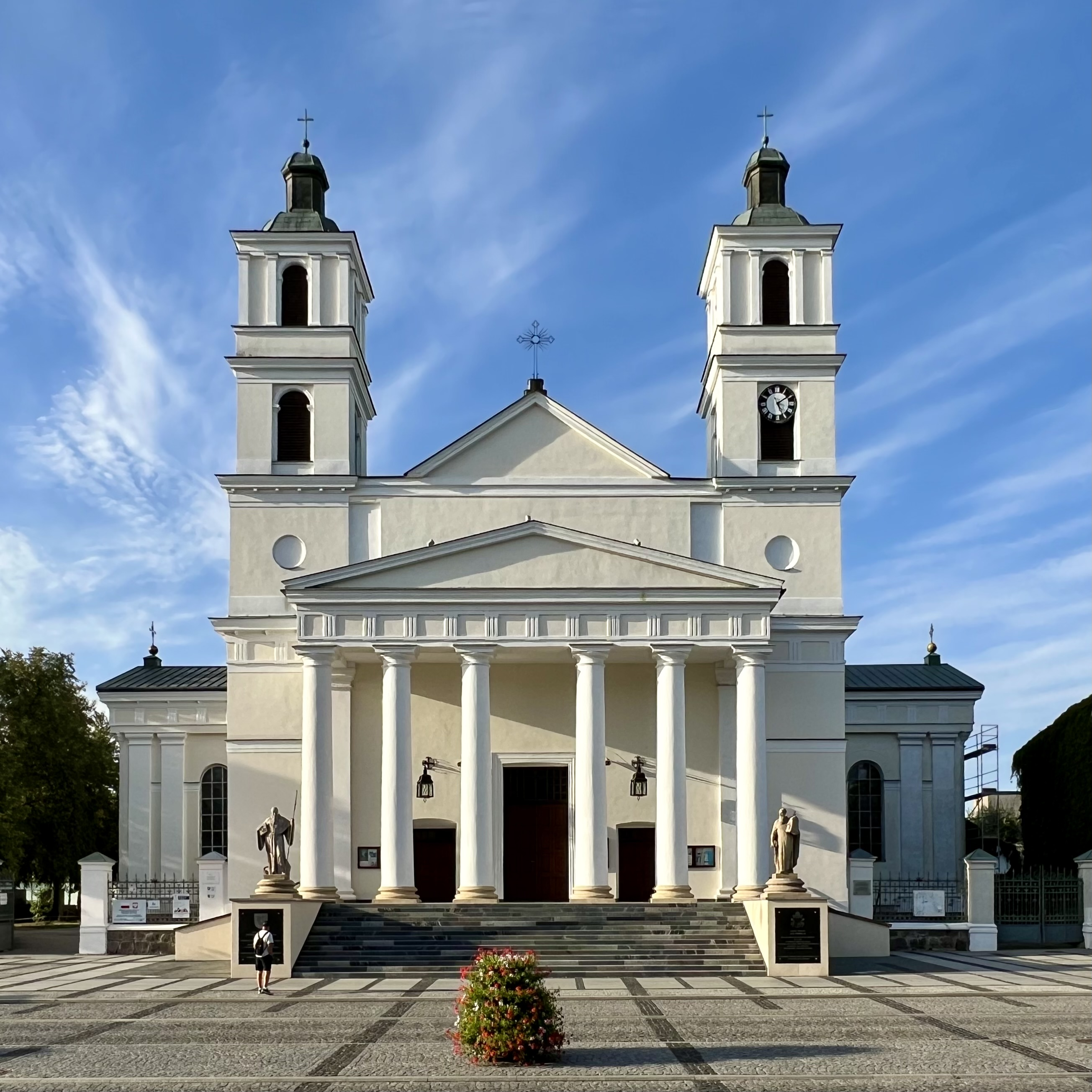
St Alexander Church, built in the 19th century

In 1807 Suwałki became a salient of the newly formed Duchy of Warsaw and one of the centres of the Łomża Department. After the defeat of Napoleon I and the Congress of Vienna, the area was incorporated into the Congress Poland ("Russian Poland"), as a part of the Russian Empire (Russian partition). The status of a powiat capital was briefly withdrawn, but it was reintroduced on 16 January 1816, when the Augustów Voivodeship was created and its government was gradually moved to Suwałki. Soon afterwards the older town hall was demolished and replaced with a new one, and General Józef Zajączek financed the paving of most of the town's streets. The cemetery was moved to the outskirts from the town centre, and that area became a town park. Also, the Russian authorities built the Saint Petersburg–Warsaw Railway, which added to the town's prosperity.

In 1820 a new church was built. In 1821 the first synagogue was opened. In 1829 a permanent post office was opened in Suwałki. Between 1806 and 1827 the town's population almost tripled and reached 3,753 people living in 357 houses. During the November Uprising of 1831, the town's population took part in the struggles against Russia, but the town was pacified by the Russian army on 11 February 1830. In 1835 the government of Tsar Nicholas I decided not to move the capital of the voivodeship to Augustów. Two years later the Voivodeships of Poland were re-designated as gubernias, and the town became the capital of the Augustów Gubernia.

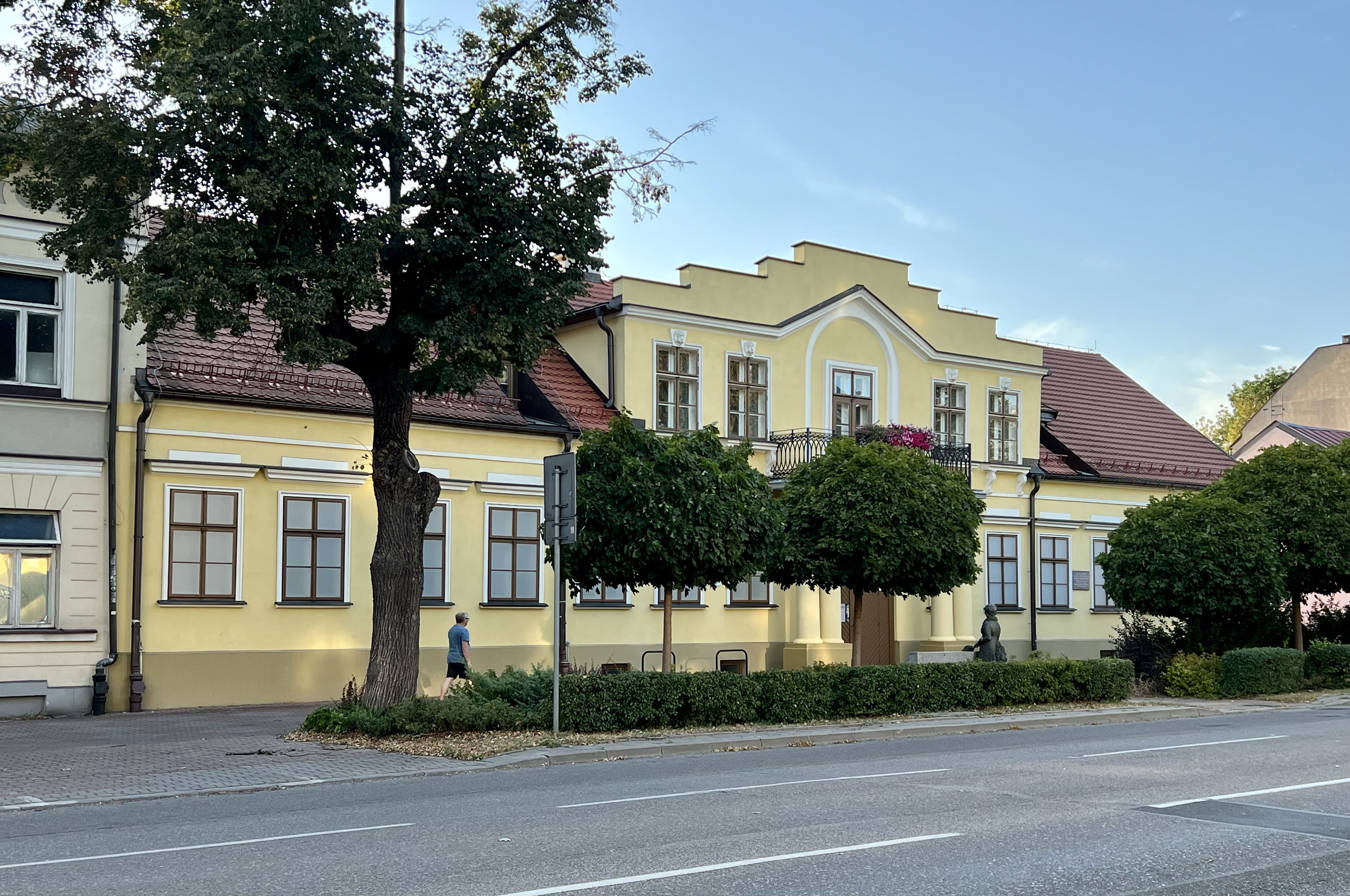
Childhood home of poet Maria Konopnicka (1842–1910)

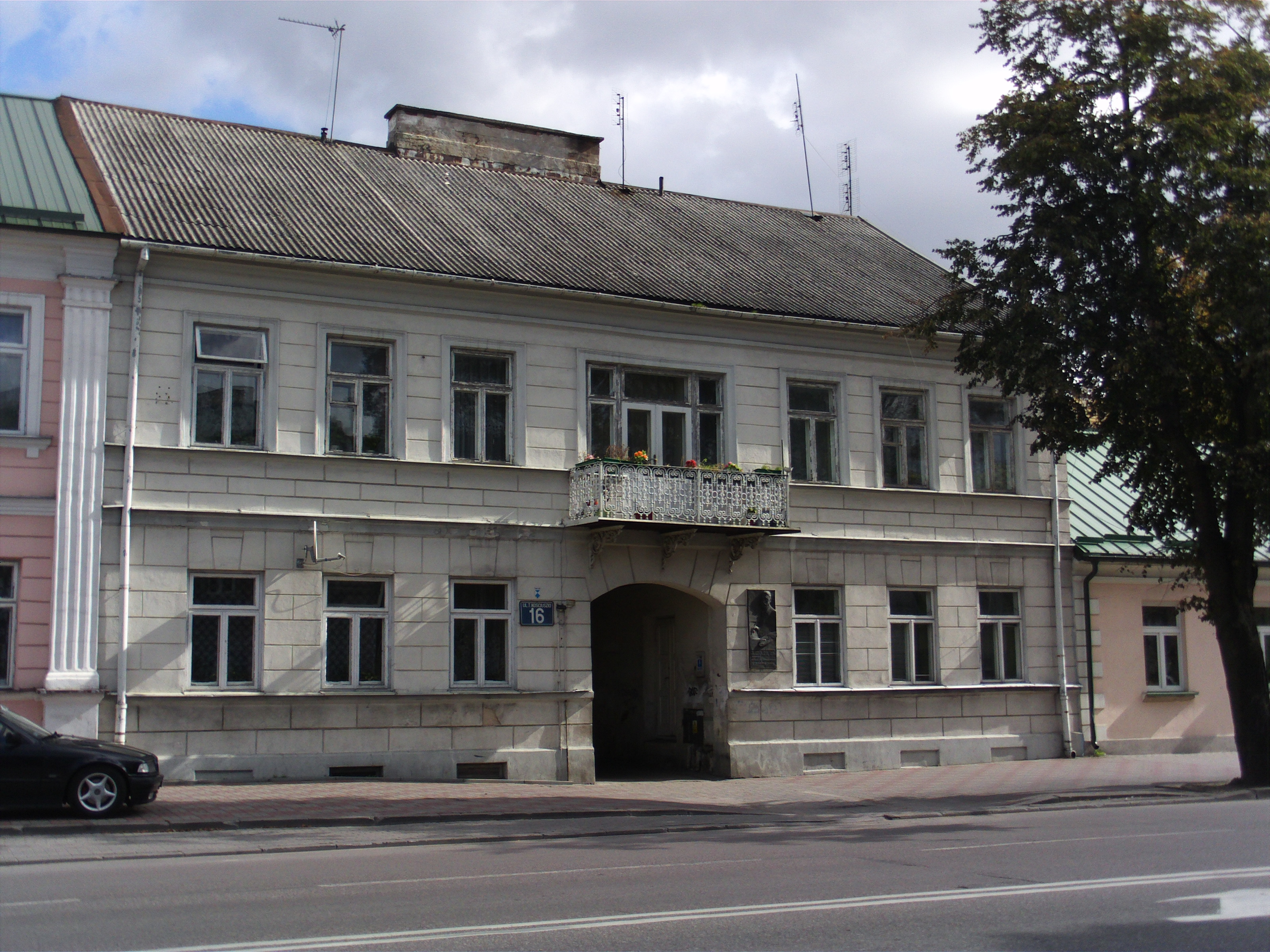
Childhood home of painter Alfred Kowalski (1849–1915)

In 1826 the Russians passed an investment plan and authorities initiated the construction of new public buildings. In 1835 a police station was built, in 1844 a new town hall and Orthodox and Protestant churches were completed. Soon afterwards a new marketplace was opened, as well as St. Peter's and Paul's hospital and a gymnasium. In addition, between 1840 and 1849 the main Catholic church was refurbished by many of Poland's most notable architects of the era, including Piotr Aigner, Antonio Corazzi and Enrico Marconi. To change the town's architecture and break with its rural past, in 1847 the town council passed a decree banning the construction of new wooden houses.

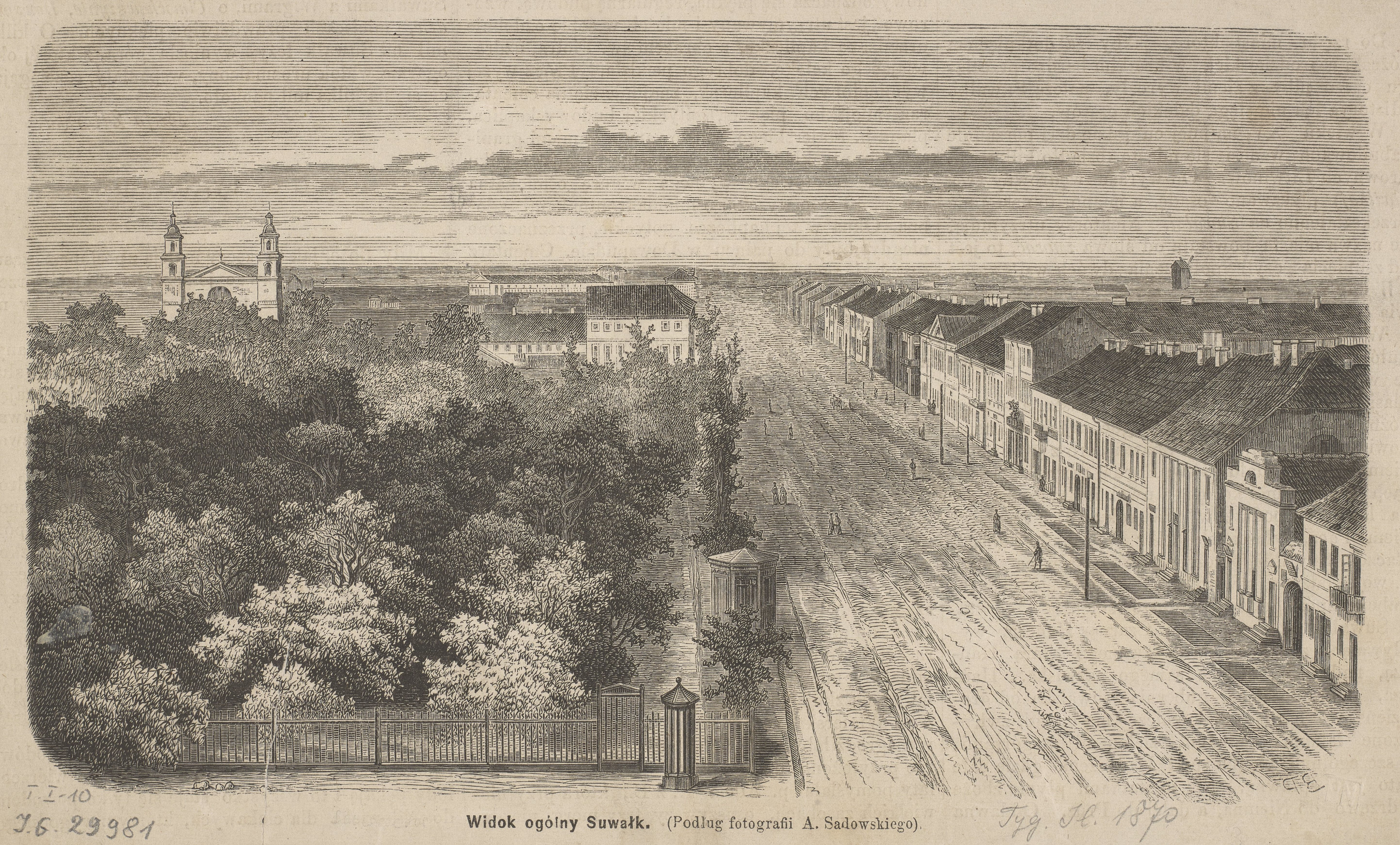
Suwałki in 1870

The town's population continued to grow rapidly. In 1857 it had 11,273 inhabitants and in 1872 almost 20,000. Newly built factories needed workers and these were brought from workers recruited widely in Europe. The mixed Polish-Jewish-Lithuanian population was soon joined by people of almost all denominations that worshipped in the Russian Empire.

Soon Suwałki became the fourth-most populous town in Congress Poland. After the January Uprising of 1863, administration reform was passed to unify the Polish lands with Russia completely. In 1866 the gubernia of Augustów was renamed to Suwałki Gubernia. However, the route of the newly built Saint Petersburg-Warsaw railway bypassed Suwałki, adversely affecting its prosperity. It was not until the early 20th century that the establishment of a new Russian army garrison revived the economy. Also, a railway line linking Suwałki with Grodno was finally completed.

=== 20th century to present ===
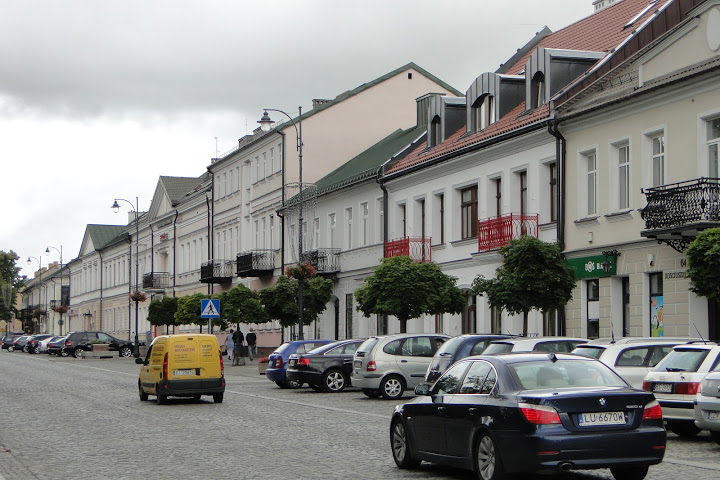
Kosciuszko street with historic tenements

After the spring of 1905, when the Russians were forced to accept a limited liberalization, the period of Polish cultural revival started. Although the Polish language was still banned from official use, new Polish schools were opened, as well as a Polish-language Tygodnik Suwalski weekly and a library. After World War I broke out, heavy fights for the area erupted. Finally in 1915, the Germans broke the Russian front and Suwałki was under German occupation. The town and surrounding areas were detached from the rest of the Polish lands and were directly administered by the German military commander of the Ober-Ost Army. Severe laws imposed by the German military command and the tragic economic situation of the civilians led to the creation of various secret social organisations. Finally, in 1917, local branches of the Polska Organizacja Wojskowa were created.

After the collapse of the Central Powers in November 1918, the local commander of the Ober-Ost signed an agreement with the Temporary Council of the Suwałki Region and de facto allowed for the region to be incorporated into Poland. However, the German army remained in the area and continued its economic exploitation. In February 1919 the local inhabitants took part in the first free elections to the Polish Sejm, but soon afterwards the German commanders changed their mind. They expelled the Polish military units from the area and in May passed the territory to Lithuanian authority.

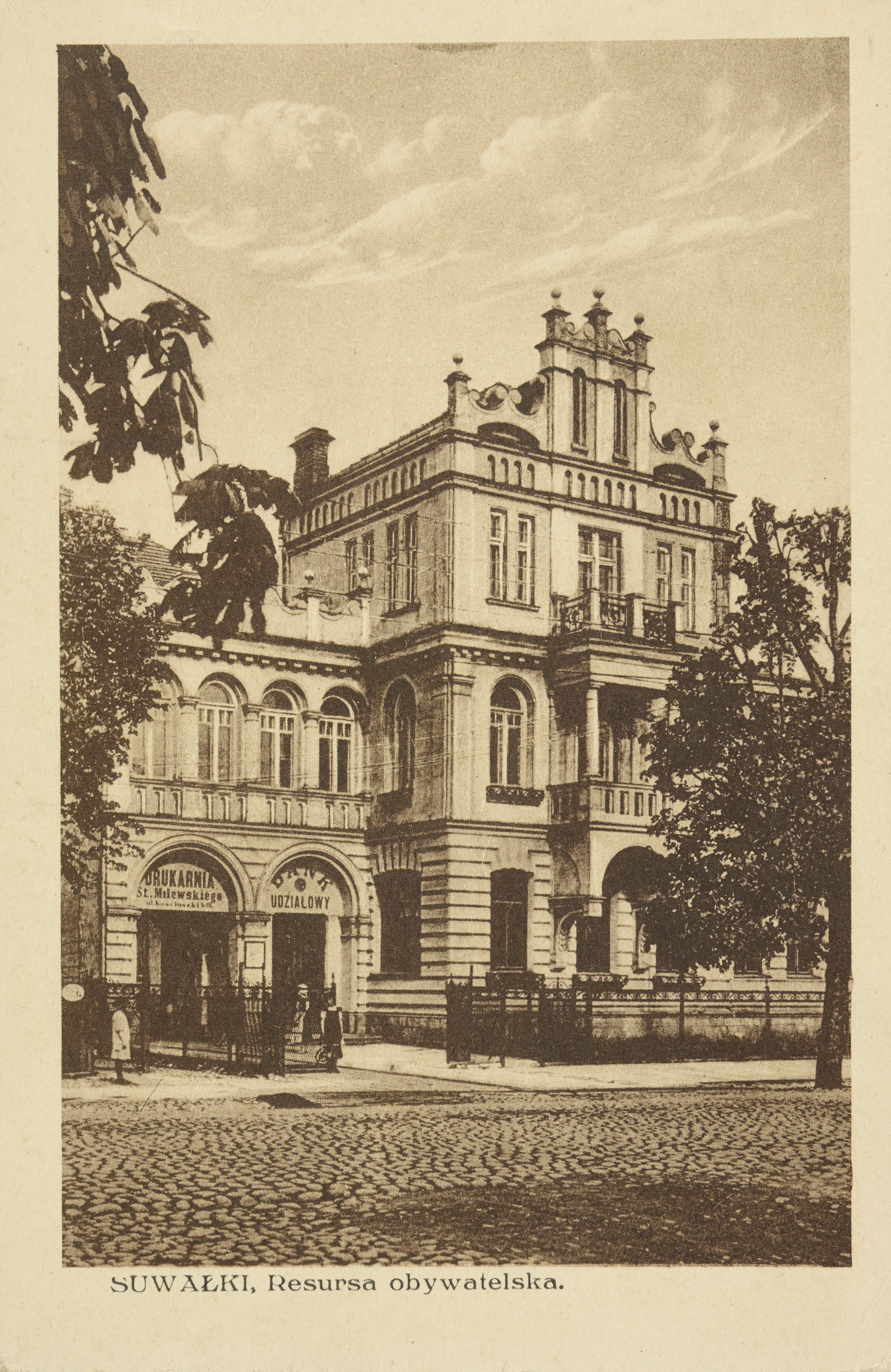
Resursa - once a trading point, now a museum

==== Independent Poland ====
By the end of July 1919, the Paris Peace Conference granted the town to Poland. As the newly-established border was disapproved of by the Polish government, it organised the Sejny Uprising on 23 August 1919. The Polish-Lithuanian War erupted and for several days fighting for control over Suwałki, Sejny and other towns in the area took place. The war ended on the insistence of the Entente in mid-September. Negotiations took place in Suwałki in early October. During the Polish-Bolshevik War, the town was captured by the Communists and, after the Battle of Warsaw, it was again passed to the Lithuanians. It was retaken by the Polish Army.

In the inter-war period, Suwałki became an autonomous town within the Białystok Voivodeship. This resulted in another period of prosperity, with the town's population rising from 16,780 in 1921 to almost 25,000 in 1935. The main source of income shifted from agriculture to trade and commerce. Also, in 1931 the new water works and a power plant were built. Also, Suwałki continued to serve as one of the biggest garrisons in Poland, with two regiments of the Polish 29th Infantry Division and almost an entire Suwałki Cavalry Brigade stationed there. Beginning in 1928, Suwałki was established as the headquarters of one of the battalions of the Border Defence Corps.

==== Second World War ====
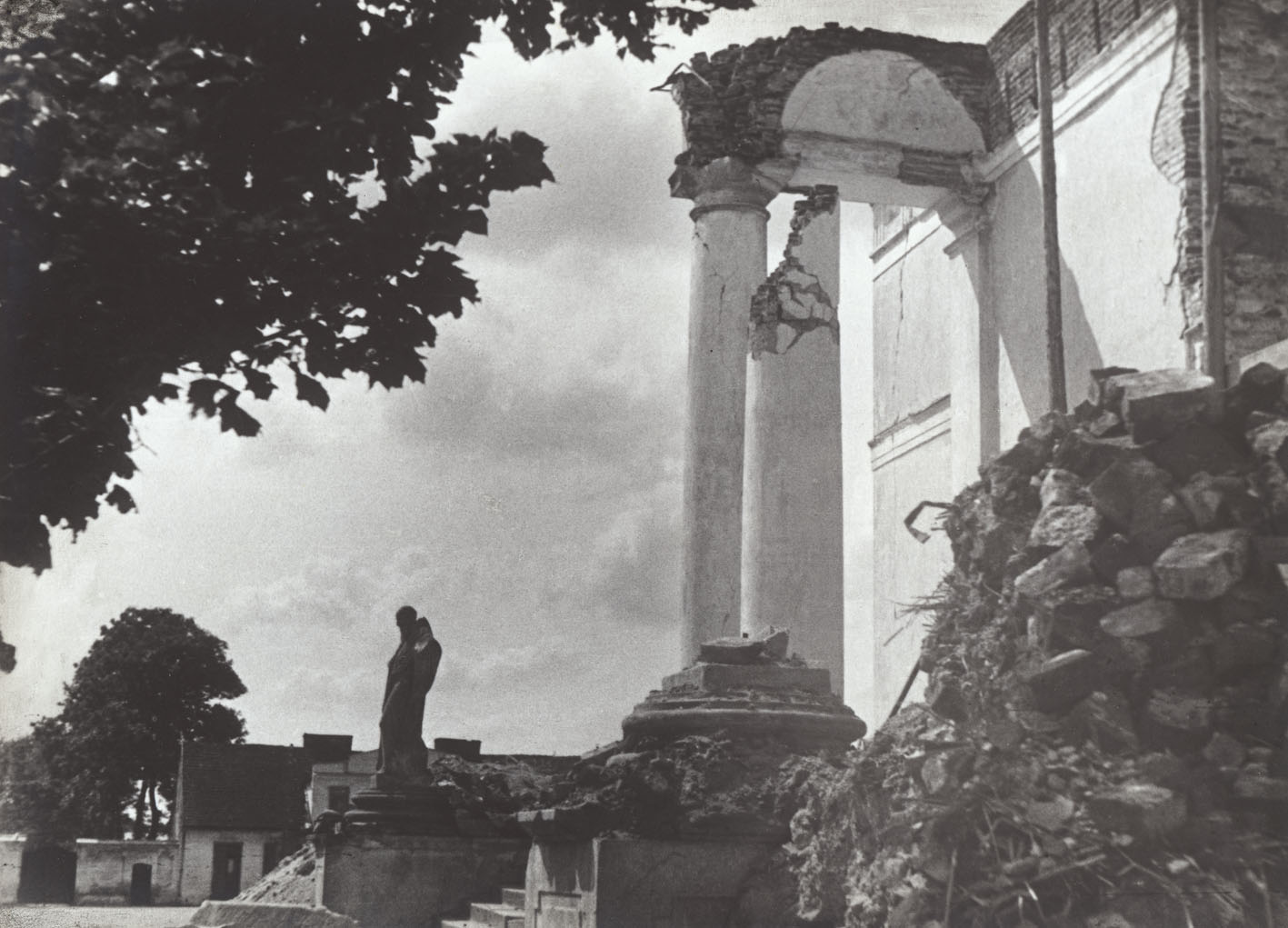
World War II destruction in Suwałki, although the destruction was quite minor

During the later stages of the Polish Defensive War of 1939, the town was briefly captured by the Red Army. However, on 12 October that year, the Soviets withdrew and transferred the area to the Germans, in accordance with the Molotov–Ribbentrop Pact. The city was renamed Sudauen and annexed directly into Nazi Germany's province of East Prussia. Germans carried out mass arrests of Poles as part of Intelligenzaktion in the fall of 1939 and spring of 1940. Arrested Poles were deported to a transit camp in Działdowo or murdered on the spot. Nazi German severe laws and terrorism led to the creation of several resistance organisations in response. Although most initially destroyed by the Gestapo, by 1942 the area had one of the strongest ZWZ and AK networks. In the Szwajcaria district there are mass graves of members of the Polish resistance movement murdered by the Germans on 26 April 1940 and 1 April 1944.

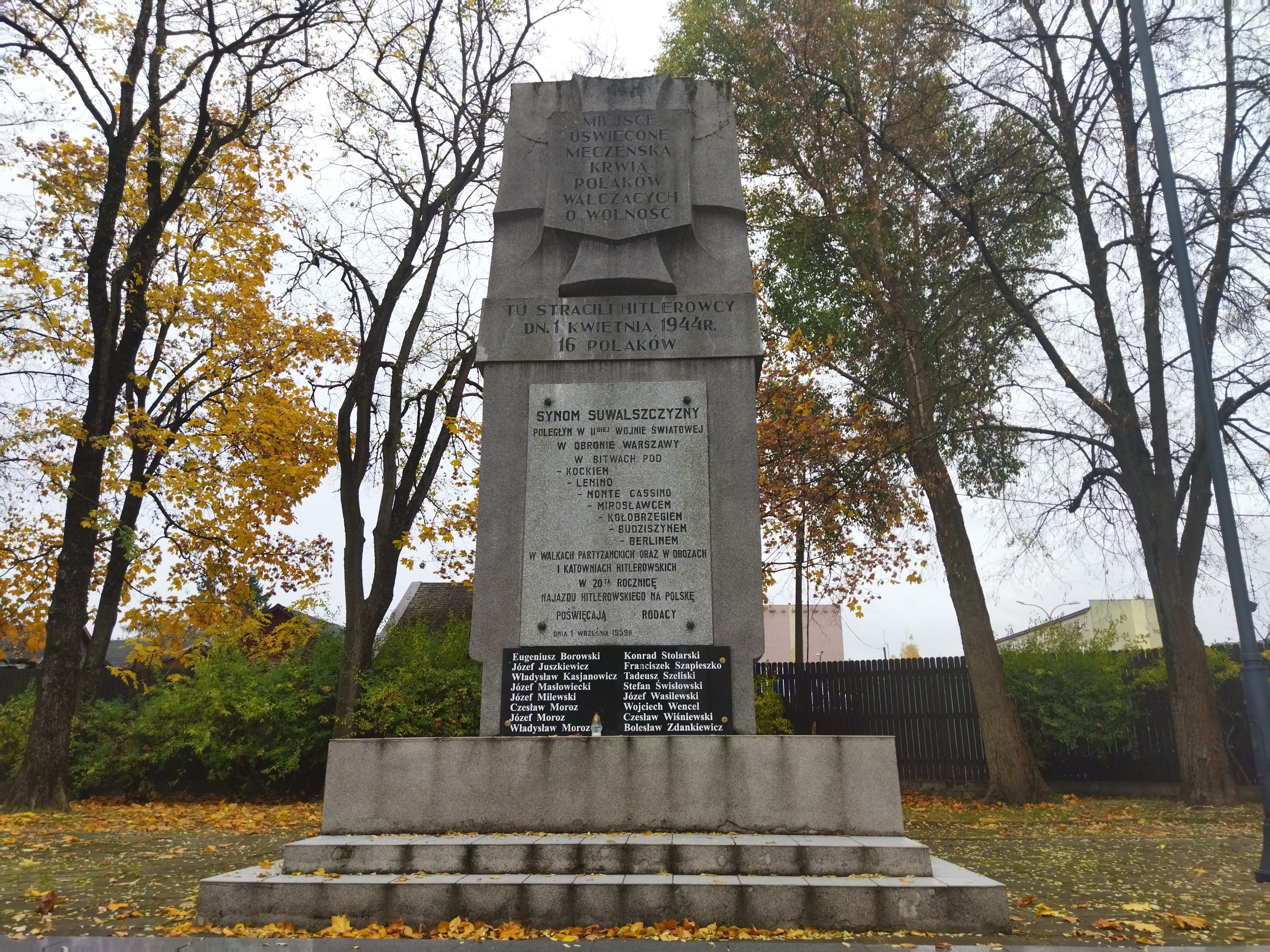
Memorial at the site of a German execution of 16 Poles carried out on 1 April 1944

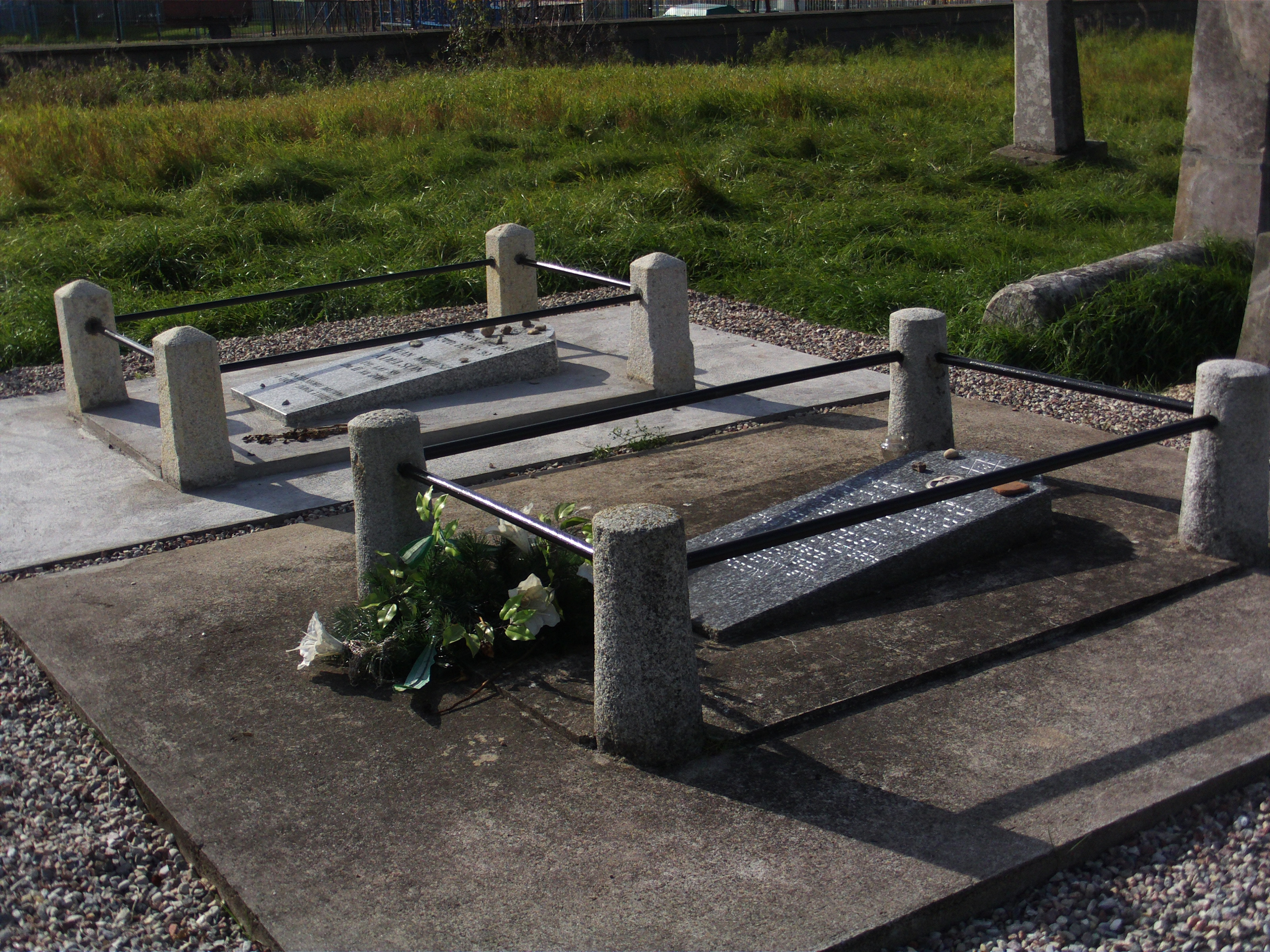
Memorial at the Jewish cemetery desecrated and destroyed by Nazi Germany; only fragments of gravestones remain today

Despite the resistance, almost all of the town's once 7,000-strong Jewish community was deported and murdered, beginning in December 1939, when German troops brought the elderly, sick, and disabled into a nearby forest and machine-gunned them en masse. The Germans, with help from local collaborators, deported the community's surviving Jews to ghettos in other towns. Nearly all either perished there or were murdered in Nazi concentration camps. The occupying Germans also systematically destroyed all traces of Jewish history and culture in the town, demolishing synagogues and desecrating Suwałki's Jewish cemetery, where a memorial and wall of gravestone fragments stand today. Also, in Suwałki's suburb of Krzywólka, the Germans established the Stalag I-F POW camp for almost 120,000 Soviet prisoners of war.

On 23 October 1944 the town was captured by the forces of the Soviet 3rd Belarusian Front. The fights for the town and its environs lasted for several days and took the lives of almost 5,000 Soviet soldiers before they defeated the Germans. The anti-Soviet resistance of former Armia Krajowa members lasted in the forests surrounding the town until the early 1950s.

Suwałki did not suffer much damage during World War II, most of the historic buildings survived the war, and the damage to the city was estimated at only 5-10%, which was quickly rebuilt.

==== Polish People's Republic ====
The apparatus subordinate to the Polish Committee of National Liberation took power in Suwałki without major problems. Immediately after the city's liberation by units of the Red Army, on 23 October 1944, Stanisław Łapot, a member of the former Communist Party of Poland, one of the organizers of the Polish Workers' Party in Białystok, came from Sejny to Suwałki. He was accompanied by several officials previously organized in Sejny with the deputy head Edmund Przybylski, as well as Tadeusz Sobolewski - the president of the interim Powiat Council. On the same day, at Mickiewicz Square, supposedly spontaneously organized, so with the participation of new authorities and over five thousand inhabitants of the city, and then in the "Rusałka" cinema hall a meeting of representatives of the population with the envoys of the Polish Committee of National Rebirth. Actions aimed at organizing the Suwałki authorities were taken shortly after the liberation. The Starosta handed over the power in the city to the temporary mayor Tadeusz Sobolewski on 24 October 1944. The commissariat of Suwałki was established. In turn, on 7 November, a conference of representatives of provincial authorities with local authorities was held. As agreed, the first meeting of the Suwałki City Council took place the next day. On 20 November 1944 the board decided to locate its office in a private, Jewish building, partly abandoned, at 62/64 Kościuszki street, as the town hall building was severely damaged. In December 1944, the City Board did not gather, and its functions were performed by Sobolewski.

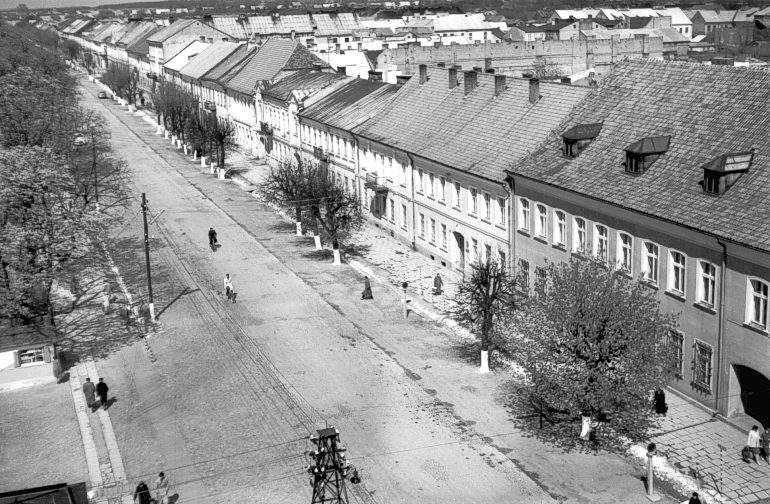
Historic townhouses at Kościuszki Street in 1957

The transitional state in the organization and functioning of the Suwałki authorities was properly completed in January 1945. Most probably then or at the beginning of February, the staroste S. Łapot issued an oral but very important order to subordinate Suwałki to the administration of the poviat level. In this way, he deprived them of the status they had until September 1939, a city separated from the poviat municipal association. Over the next few years, this matter was dealt with by various authorities, from municipal to central. This controversial problem appeared on 27 March 1945, on the initiative of the mayor Sobolewski, at the third meeting of the City National Council. The governor Wacław Kraśko, who was present at it, was rather reluctant to propose separating the city from the poviat and pointed to the need to improve, first and foremost, the situation and condition of municipal enterprises. The Council decided to postpone the case.

Another politician calling for restoring Suwałki to the legal status of before 1 September 1939 was mayor Wacław Rudzki. At the Municipal National Council meeting on 25 March 1946 he submitted the first motion to separate the city from the poviat, which was motivated by prestigious, historical and financial considerations. The Council shared the submitted arguments and decided, through the Poviat National Council, to apply to the Voivodeship National Council in Bialystok with a request to include the city separated from poviat self-government associations. Much more radical decisions, undoubtedly also under the influence of W. Rudzki, MRN made at its meeting on 27 May 1946. She decided that the rescript of the Ministry of Internal Affairs of December 1919 about the separation of Suwałki from the poviat remains in force, therefore she is the council of the separated city and reports to the Provincial National Council in Bialystok. The Council also elected, without discussion and by acclamation, the incumbent mayor of the city, Rudzki.

After this revolt, the reaction of the superior authorities was swift. Already in mid-June 1946, the voivode demanded that the chairman of the Suwałki Poviat Department (starosta) suspend the implementation of the Municipal National Council resolutions of 27 May, while informing that in the matter of restoring Suwałki's rights as a separate city, he turned to the Ministry of Public Administration. And indeed the voivode, writing favorably about Suwałki, their development and the achievements of the authorities, mainly Rudzki, asked the ministry for guidelines and a suggestion of a positive resolution of the case, although the relevant regulations did not allow it, mainly because the number of inhabitants of the city did not reach 25,000. After the lapse of the month, Rudzki not only did not become president, but also resigned from the position of mayor. Nevertheless, on 25 July 1946, the MRN decided to send a delegation of councilors composed of Leon Bracławski, Józef Wiszniewski and Antoni Zalewski to the Ministry of the Interior to support current activities and accelerate the restoration of Suwałki's rights of a separated city.

Following the end of the war and the establishment of a communist regime, the new authorities of Poland began establishing territorial branches of the security services, most notably the Ministry of Public Security, in the whole country and in Suwałki as well: The seat of the PUBP was located at 5 Kościuszki street in 1944, and at the same year it was transferred to building no. 78 in the same street where it was located up until 1956.

After the war, Suwałki was retained as the capital of the powiat. However, the heavily damaged town recovered very slowly, and the Communist economic system could not support the reinvestment needed. In 1975 new administrative reform was implemented: Suwałki was designated as the capital of a separate Suwałki Voivodeship. The number of inhabitants rose rapidly, and by the end of the 1970s, the population was over 36,000. Large factories were built in the town, and it became one of the important industrial and commercial centres of Eastern Poland.

During the period of martial law in Poland and rise of Solidarność in the early 1980s, Solidarność demanded that the buildings of the Polish United Workers' Party and the Citizens' Militia be handed over to be used for social infrastructure, primarily schools, kindergartens and hospitals. This position was taken by the Inter-Enterprise Founding Committee of the Solidarity Independent Trade Union in Giżycko and Suwałki in regards to the party complex in 83 Noniewicza street. The first round of talks on this matter with representatives of authorities (including central authorities) took place on 28 January 1981. Solidarność emphasized that the new buildings could be turned into medical clinics, a community center for youth and a music school. It strengthened its position with over 18 thousand signatures from the inhabitants of the region. No agreement was reached, because the authorities did not want to hand over the building. Before the next round of talks on the night of 14–15 February, under the cover of the Citizens' Militia and Security Service, the PZPR KW was moved to new buildings. This action caused widespread indignation in the whole province, not only among the members of Solidarity.

==== Post-communist Poland ====
Following the end of Communist rule in 1989, Suwałki had a difficult period in transitioning to a new economic system. Most of the town's major factories were inefficient and went bankrupt. Creation of the Suwałki Special Economic Zone and the proximity of the Russian and Lithuanian borders opened new possibilities for local trade and commerce. In addition, the region began to attract many tourists from all around the world. In the 21st century, residents of Suwałki frequently travel across the Russian and Lithuanian borders for shopping trips as well as to make use of the various attractions both countries offer.

To the military planners of NATO, an area of the Lithuania–Poland border area is known as the Suwałki Gap because it represents a military difficulty. It is a flat narrow piece of land, a gap, that is between Belarus and Russia's Kaliningrad exclave and that connects the three NATO-member Baltic States to Poland and the rest of NATO.

== Demographics ==
2002 – 68,923 inhabitants,
by nationality:

- Poles – 98.0% (67,556);
- Lithuanians – 0.5% (326);
- Romani people – 0.2% (104);
- Russians – 0.1% (80);
- Other – 1.2% (857).

1931 – 21,826 inhabitants,
by language:

- Polish – 71.0% (15,489);
- Yiddish – 21.4% (4,660);
- Hebrew – 4.9% (1,078);
- Russian – 1.8% (386);
- German – 0.5% (102);
- Ukrainian – 0.3% (63);
- Lithuanian – 0.1% (20);
- Belarusian – 0.04% (8);
- Other – 13;
- Unspecified – 7.

1921 – 16,780 inhabitants,
by nationality:

- Poles – 69.8% (11,719);
- Jews – 28.6% (4,804);
- Russians – 0.9% (159);
- Germans – 0.3% (54);
- Lithuanians – 0.1% (21);
- Belarusians – 0.1% (15);
- Other – 8.

1897 – 22,648 inhabitants,
by language:

- Polish – 38.7% (8,768);
- Jewish – 32.9% (7,454);
- Russian – 21.6% (4,894);
- German – 3.0% (670);
- Belarusian – 1.0% (221);
- Tatar – 0.8% (180);
- Ukrainian – 0.6% (147);
- Chuvash – 0.5% (118)
- Lithuanian – 0.5% (110);
- Mari – 0.1% (14);
- Other – 0.3% (72).

== Climate ==
Suwałki has a climate that is characterised by changeable weather patterns. The city has a warm-summer humid continental climate (Köppen: Dfb) and, relatively to the rest of Poland, the city's climate has markedly continental characteristics even though there is some moderation from the Baltic Sea. Suwałki has among the greatest record temperature amplitudes in Poland: the lowest temperature was recorded on 12 January 1950 (−35.5 °C (−32 °F)), while the highest was 37 °C (99 °F), on 11 July 1946. It also holds the record for the highest atmospheric pressure ever registered in the country, at 1,064.8 hPa (31.44 inHg) on 23 January 1907.

The weather changes are common due to the fact that, like in the rest of Poland, weather fronts generated by low-pressure areas come along frequently. Due to its northerly location and the relatively little moderation of the Baltic, the growing season around the city is the shortest in Poland; according to the data from 1995-2019, the period of sustained average daily temperatures exceeding 5 °C (41 °F) was only 200 days long, about 20–30 days shorter than in central and southern Poland. Suwałki is often called the "Polish pole of cold" (polski biegun zimna) because it has the lowest average temperature of the major cities in Poland, excepting mountainous areas (the actual "pole of cold" is located about 25 km (16 mi) north of the city, in the village of Wiżajny).

Winters are just cold enough, if the −3 °C (27 °F) isotherm is accepted, not to be classified as oceanic (Köppen: Cfb). The skies are often overcast and snow is frequent in the season, but there is much less precipitation in the winter months than in the sunnier summer months. Nights with temperatures below −15 °C (5 °F) sometimes occur, and temperatures below −25 °C (−13 °F) are not unheard of. According to the Institute of Meteorology and Water Management (IMGW), the snow stays there for the longest time in non-mountainous areas of Poland. The city is so cold that before 2015, Suwałki was only one of the four cities in Poland to have experienced winter conditions in every period from December to February (defined as the daily mean temperature of the month going below 0 °C (32 °F)); the extremely anomalous winter of 2019/2020 was the first in which Suwałki did not experience such conditions.

Summers are pleasant, warm and often sunny, with the maximum daily temperatures sometimes exceeding 30 °C (86 °F), though the season is still somewhat cooler in the city, as compared to the rest of Poland.

Climate data for Suwałki (1991-2020 normals, 1951-present extremes)
Month	Jan	Feb	Mar	Apr	May	Jun	Jul	Aug	Sep	Oct	Nov	Dec	Year
Record high °C (°F)	11.9 (53.4)	14.8 (58.6)	20.4 (68.7)	28.5 (83.3)	30.9 (87.6)	33.0 (91.4)	35.3 (95.5)	34.8 (94.6)	33.3 (91.9)	24.0 (75.2)	15.7 (60.3)	11.4 (52.5)	35.3 (95.5)
Mean daily maximum °C (°F)	−1.0 (30.2)	0.2 (32.4)	4.9 (40.8)	12.7 (54.9)	18.4 (65.1)	21.5 (70.7)	23.8 (74.8)	23.3 (73.9)	17.7 (63.9)	10.9 (51.6)	4.5 (40.1)	0.5 (32.9)	11.5 (52.7)
Daily mean °C (°F)	−3.3 (26.1)	−2.6 (27.3)	0.9 (33.6)	7.3 (45.1)	12.6 (54.7)	15.9 (60.6)	18.1 (64.6)	17.4 (63.3)	12.5 (54.5)	7.0 (44.6)	2.3 (36.1)	−1.6 (29.1)	7.2 (45.0)
Mean daily minimum °C (°F)	−5.7 (21.7)	−5.4 (22.3)	−2.8 (27.0)	2.0 (35.6)	6.7 (44.1)	10.3 (50.5)	12.7 (54.9)	11.9 (53.4)	8.0 (46.4)	3.7 (38.7)	0.2 (32.4)	−3.9 (25.0)	3.1 (37.6)
Record low °C (°F)	−32.0 (−25.6)	−32.0 (−25.6)	−29.7 (−21.5)	−10.0 (14.0)	−4.6 (23.7)	−0.9 (30.4)	3.2 (37.8)	0.9 (33.6)	−4.3 (24.3)	−14.2 (6.4)	−20.7 (−5.3)	−29.6 (−21.3)	−32.0 (−25.6)
Average precipitation mm (inches)	38.1 (1.50)	31.5 (1.24)	36.8 (1.45)	34.8 (1.37)	53.8 (2.12)	66.9 (2.63)	85.6 (3.37)	70.9 (2.79)	52.3 (2.06)	52.4 (2.06)	42.8 (1.69)	41.0 (1.61)	607.1 (23.90)
Average extreme snow depth cm (inches)	11.9 (4.7)	13.3 (5.2)	10.3 (4.1)	2.9 (1.1)	0.3 (0.1)	0.0 (0.0)	0.0 (0.0)	0.0 (0.0)	0.0 (0.0)	0.6 (0.2)	2.7 (1.1)	7.2 (2.8)	13.3 (5.2)
Average precipitation days (≥ 0.1 mm)	17.27	15.61	14.27	11.30	13.37	13.63	14.13	13.17	11.83	13.90	15.53	17.23	171.24
Average snowy days (≥ 0,0 cm)	20.7	19.8	11.7	1.7	0.1	0.0	0.0	0.0	0.0	0.8	5.5	15.6	75.9
Average relative humidity (%)	90.2	87.7	81.0	71.7	71.3	73.6	75.3	75.8	81.5	86.9	91.8	91.9	81.6
Mean monthly sunshine hours	35.8	54.2	119.9	182.2	249.7	252.4	252.3	233.3	155.3	90.8	29.7	23.3	1,678.9
Source 1: Institute of Meteorology and Water Management
Source 2: meteomodel.pl (humidity and extremes)

Climate data for Suwałki (Szwajcaria), elevation: 184 m or 604 ft, 1961-1990 normals and extremes
Month	Jan	Feb	Mar	Apr	May	Jun	Jul	Aug	Sep	Oct	Nov	Dec	Year
Record high °C (°F)	8.3 (46.9)	14.8 (58.6)	20.4 (68.7)	26.9 (80.4)	30.3 (86.5)	31.9 (89.4)	34.5 (94.1)	34.6 (94.3)	29.7 (85.5)	24.0 (75.2)	15.7 (60.3)	11.4 (52.5)	34.6 (94.3)
Mean daily maximum °C (°F)	−2.9 (26.8)	−1.7 (28.9)	3.1 (37.6)	10.5 (50.9)	17.4 (63.3)	20.4 (68.7)	21.6 (70.9)	21.4 (70.5)	16.6 (61.9)	10.6 (51.1)	3.8 (38.8)	−0.6 (30.9)	10.0 (50.0)
Daily mean °C (°F)	−5.3 (22.5)	−4.6 (23.7)	−0.6 (30.9)	5.6 (42.1)	12.2 (54.0)	15.4 (59.7)	16.6 (61.9)	16.0 (60.8)	11.6 (52.9)	6.8 (44.2)	1.7 (35.1)	−2.7 (27.1)	6.1 (42.9)
Mean daily minimum °C (°F)	−8.2 (17.2)	−7.7 (18.1)	−4.0 (24.8)	1.4 (34.5)	6.7 (44.1)	10.0 (50.0)	11.4 (52.5)	10.9 (51.6)	7.4 (45.3)	3.5 (38.3)	−0.5 (31.1)	−5.2 (22.6)	2.1 (35.8)
Record low °C (°F)	−30.7 (−23.3)	−29.0 (−20.2)	−29.7 (−21.5)	−10.0 (14.0)	−4.3 (24.3)	−0.9 (30.4)	3.2 (37.8)	0.9 (33.6)	−4.3 (24.3)	−8.6 (16.5)	−19.7 (−3.5)	−27.8 (−18.0)	−30.7 (−23.3)
Average precipitation mm (inches)	32 (1.3)	24 (0.9)	32 (1.3)	35 (1.4)	57 (2.2)	75 (3.0)	77 (3.0)	68 (2.7)	54 (2.1)	49 (1.9)	52 (2.0)	39 (1.5)	594 (23.3)
Average precipitation days (≥ 1.0 mm)	8.5	6.9	8.3	8.0	9.0	10.5	10.3	9.3	9.9	8.7	10.5	10.1	110
Mean monthly sunshine hours	37.0	62.0	115.0	156.0	226.0	239.0	232.0	216.0	143.0	90.0	33.0	27.0	1,576
Source: NOAA

== Sights ==
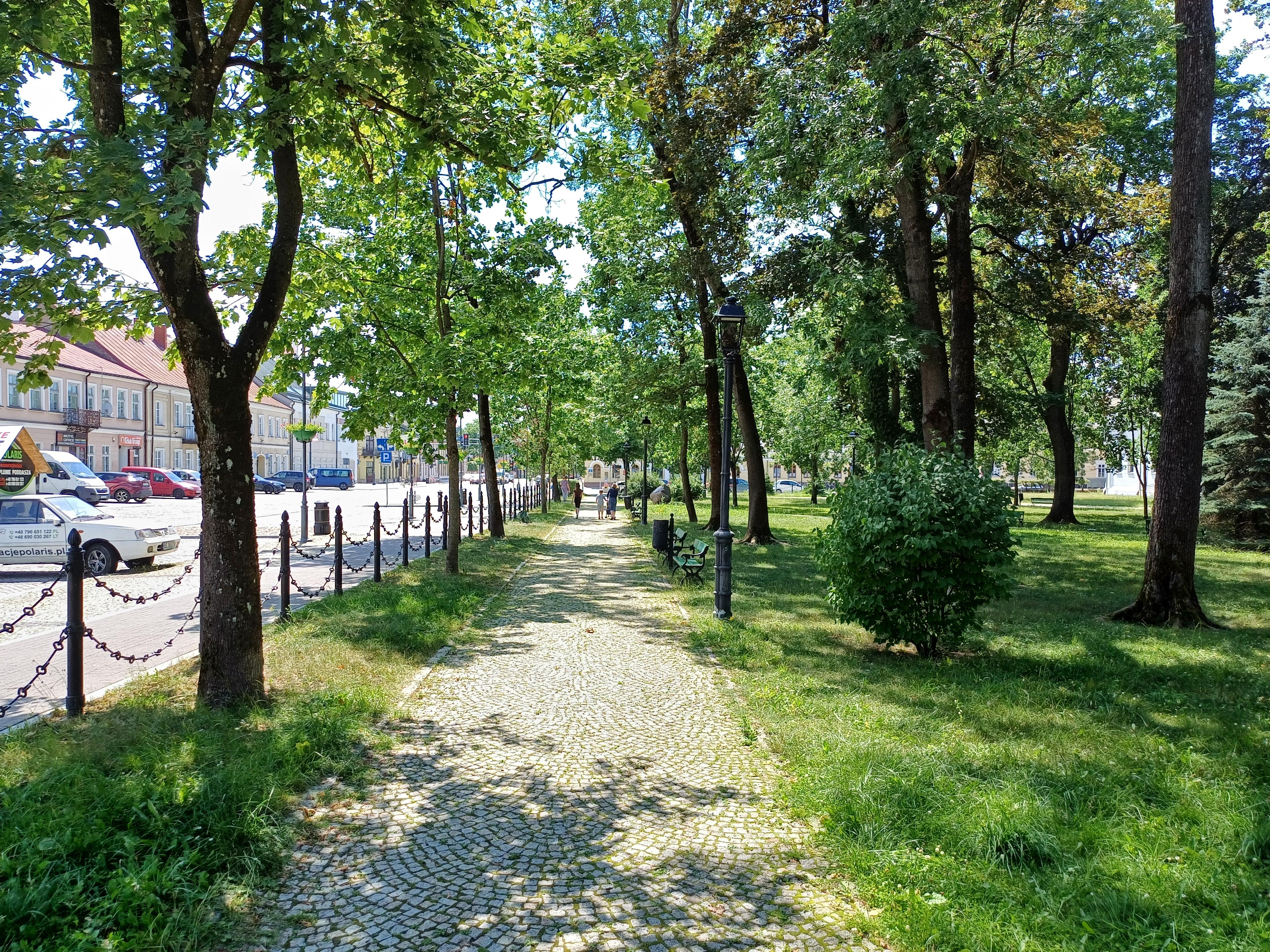
Park of the 3rd May Constitution

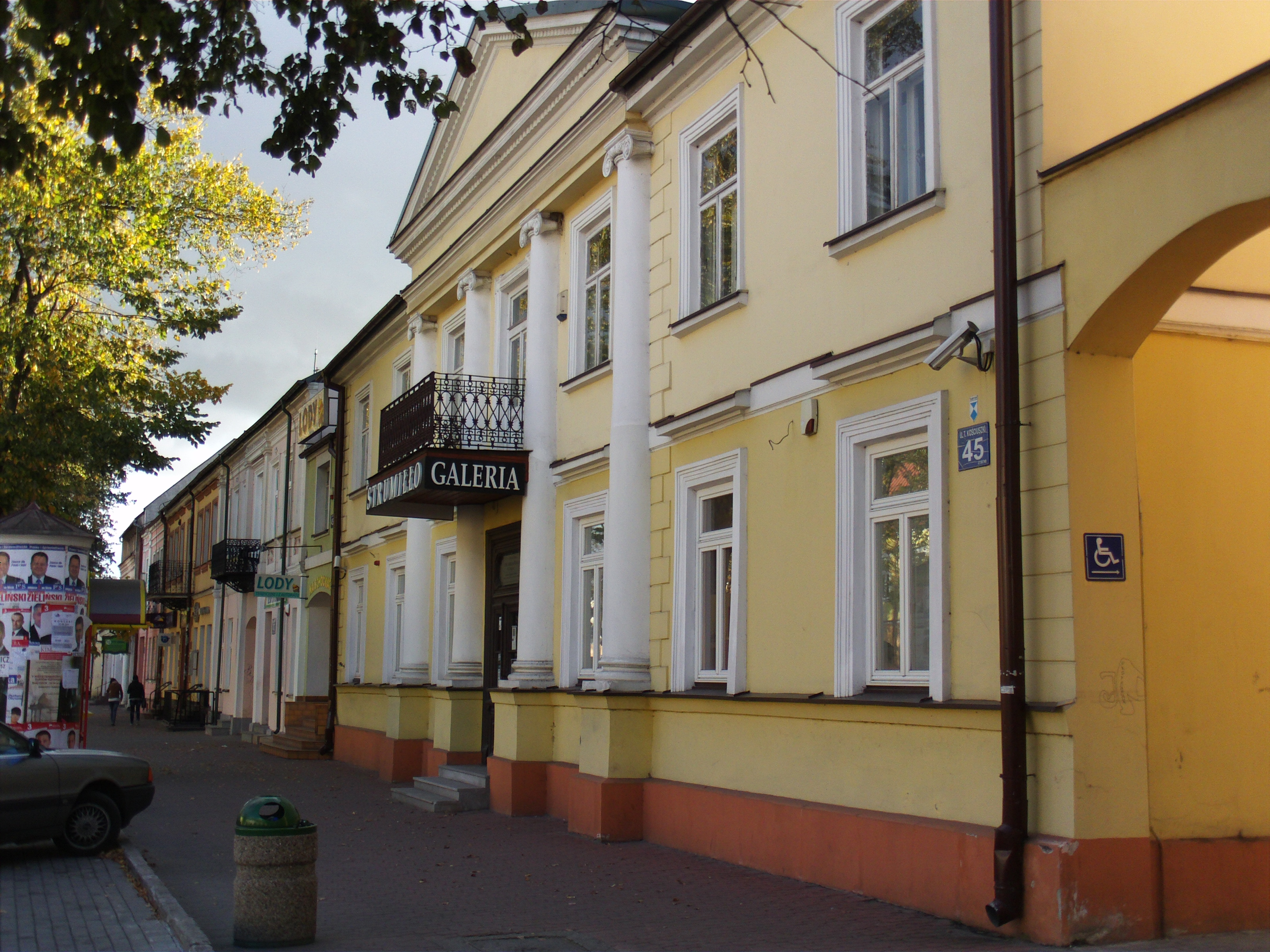
Andrzej Strumiłło Gallery

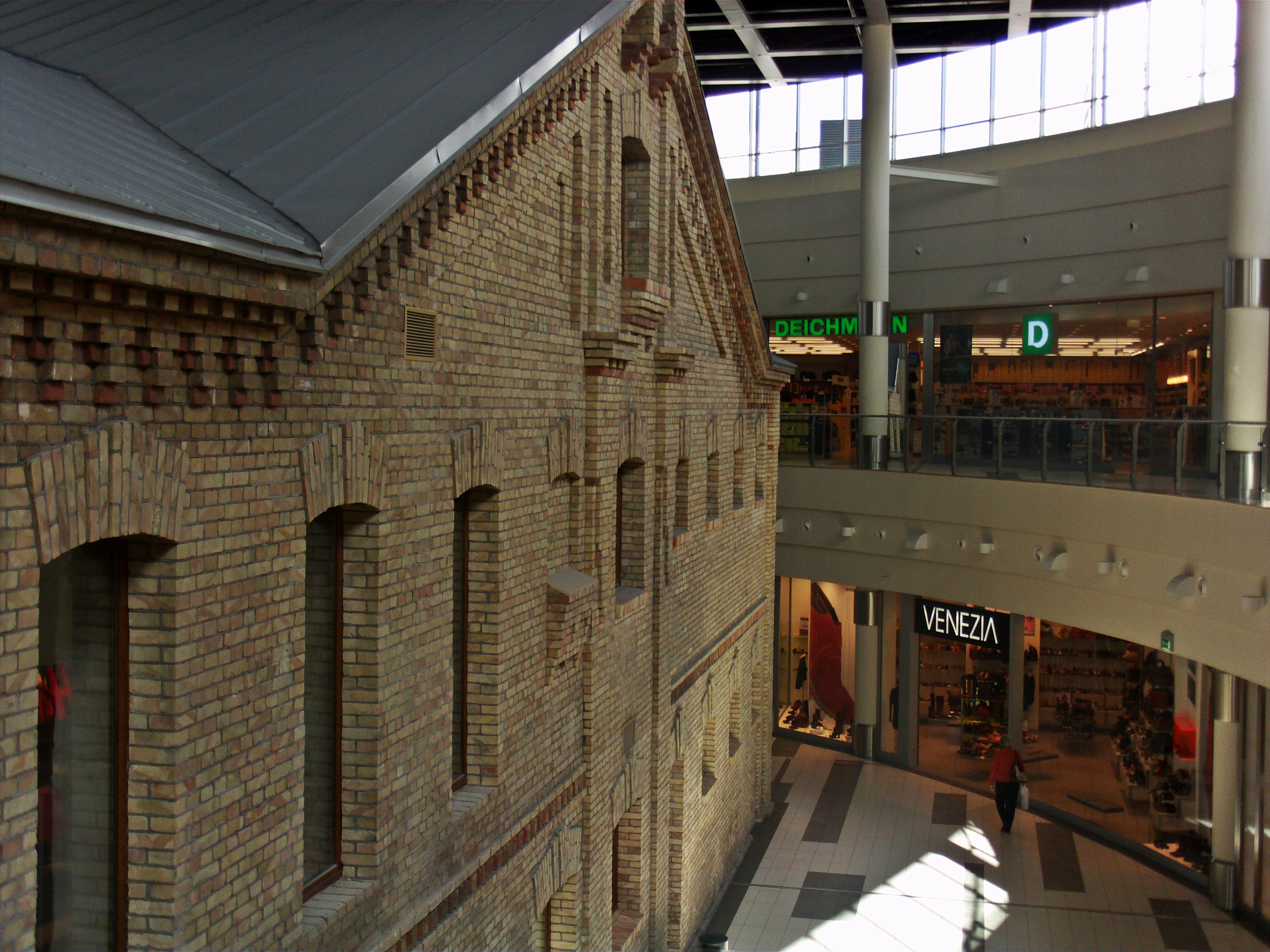
Suwałki Plaza shopping mall

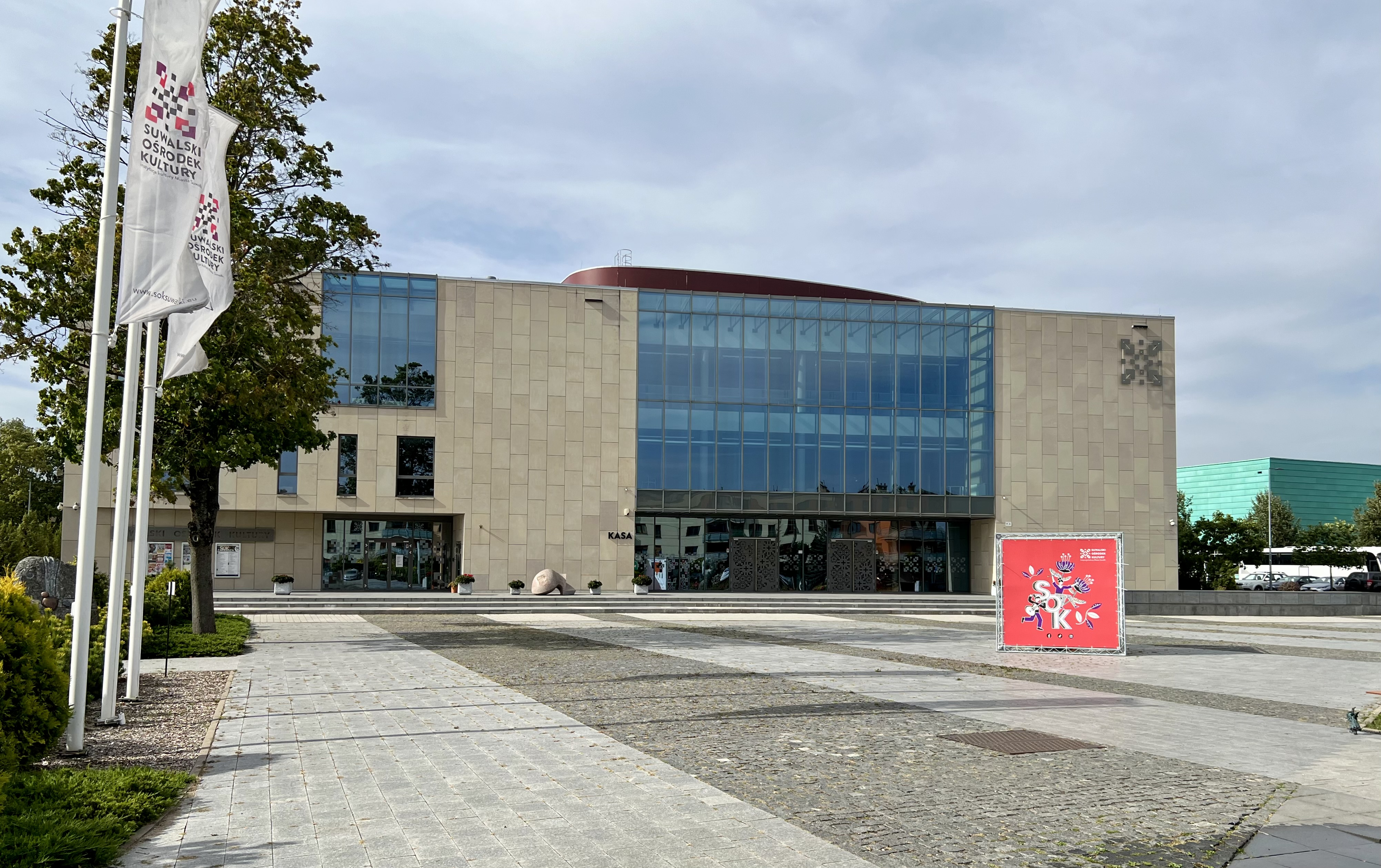
Suwałki Culture Centre

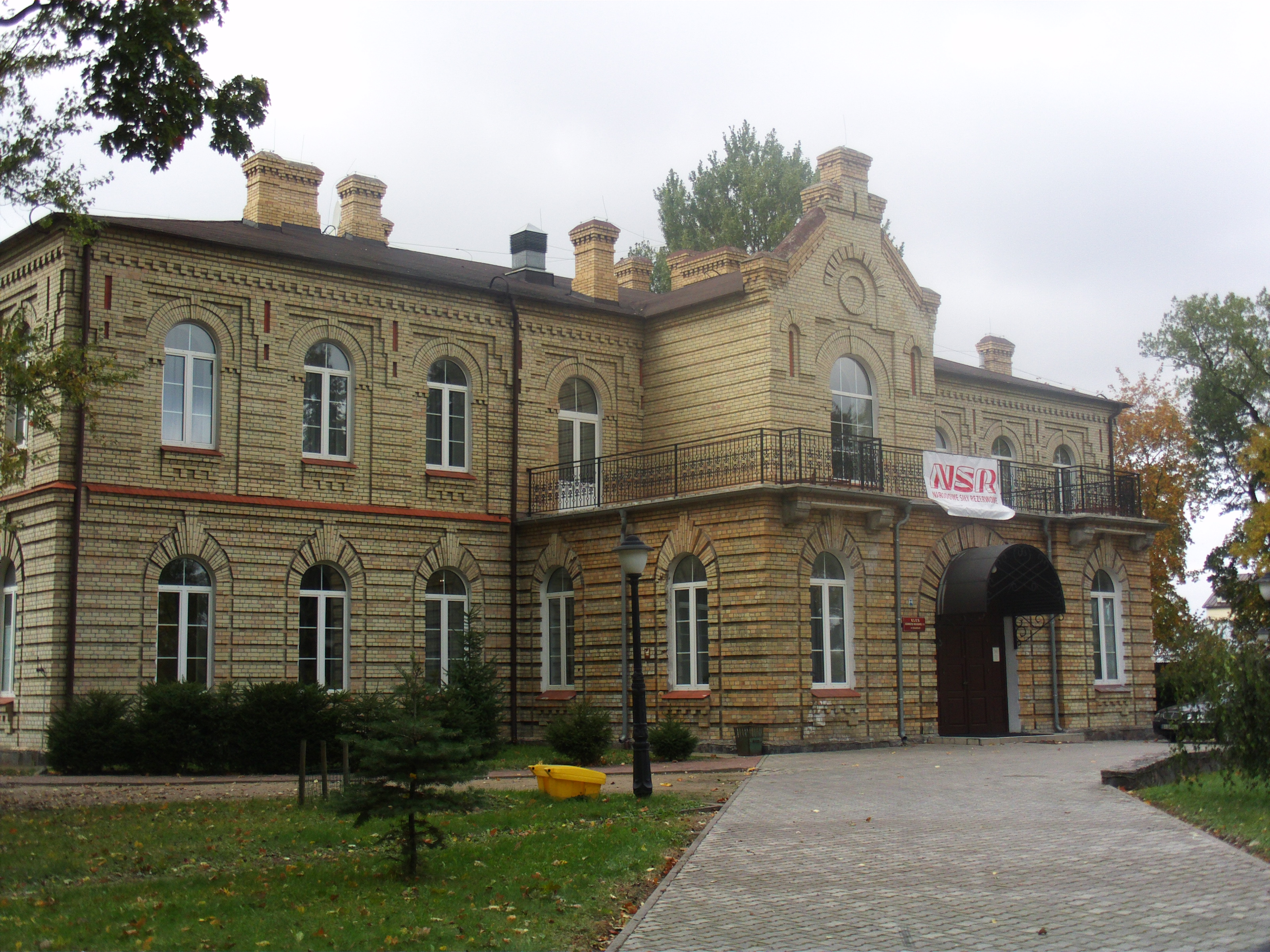
Museum of the History and Tradition of Soldiers of the Suwałki Region

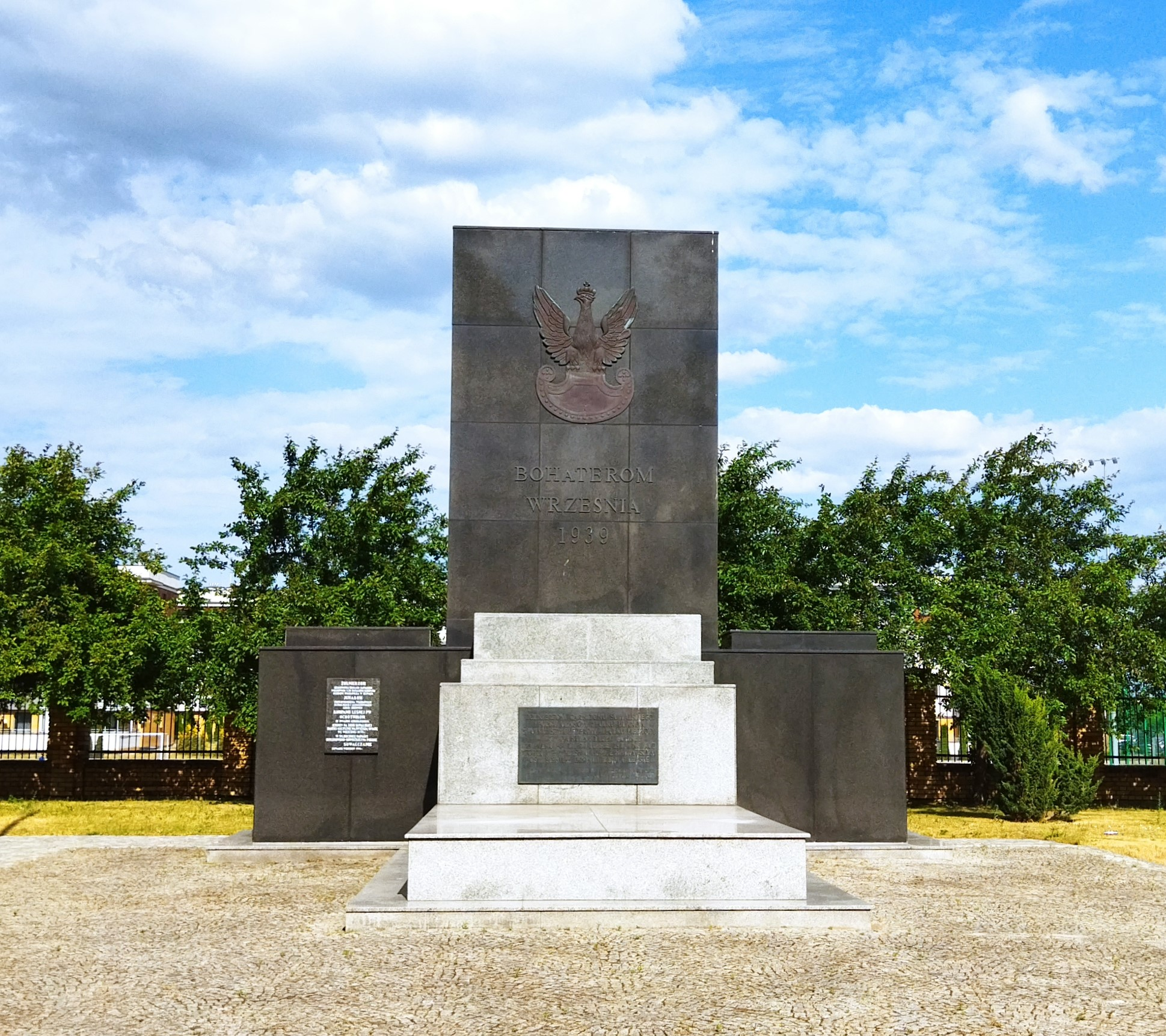
Monument to the Heroes of September 1939

- Aquapark Suwałki
- Kościuszko street with Neoclassical architecture
- Romantic 19th-century Park of the 3 May Constitution
- Saint Alexander Co-Cathedral
- St. Peter's and Paul's Church
- Chłodna Street pedestrian zone
- District Museum at the former Resursa (trading point)
- Museum of Polish poet Maria Konopnicka at her childhood home
- Monument to Maria Konopnicka
- Andrzej Strumiłło Gallery
- Town Hall (Ratusz)
- Former gymnasium building
- Childhood home of Polish painter Alfred Kowalski
- 19th century brewery of Wacław Kunc
- Cemetery complex on Bakałarzewska street (Roman Catholic, Orthodox, Protestant, Jewish and Muslim)
- Suwałki Plaza, a shopping mall and cinema complex that opened in 2010. The mall contains stores with various products such as groceries, books, clothing, shoes and accessories
- Museum of the History and Tradition of Soldiers of the Suwałki Region (Muzeum Historii i Tradycji Żołnierzy Suwalszczyzny) in historical barracks
- Suwałki Culture Centre
- Monument to the Heroes of September 1939
- Memorials at the site of German massacres of Poles from World War II
- Soviet Soldiers Cemetery

== Transport ==
The S61 expressway bypasses the town to the west. Exits 19, 17 and 18 of the expressway provide for a fast connection to Kaunas in Lithuania to the north-east and to Warsaw to the south-west.

Direct trains from Suwałki to Warsaw (Warszawa Centralna) are operated by PKP Intercity, typically taking around 4 to 5 hours for the journey.

There is one direct train to Kaunas in the afternoon. The journey takes 2 hr 40 minutes. The service is operated as part of the international service between Poland and Lithuania (e.g., Warsaw–Vilnius).

There are up to 10 daily buses from Suwałki to Kaunas (one of them is overnight). There are 7 daily coaches to Warsaw. They are operated by Flixbus. The journey takes around 4 hours.

The closest major international airports are Kaunas (KUN) in Lithuania (approx. 100–120 km) or Vilnius (VNO) in Lithuania (approx. 150–170 km), however Suwałki also has its own local domestic airport, Suwałki Airport.

== Education ==
- Wyższa Szkoła Służby Społecznej im. Ks. Franciszka Blachnickiego
- Wyższa Szkoła Suwalsko-Mazurska im. Papieża Jana Pawła II
- Państwowa Wyższa Szkoła Zawodowa w Suwałkach

== Sport ==
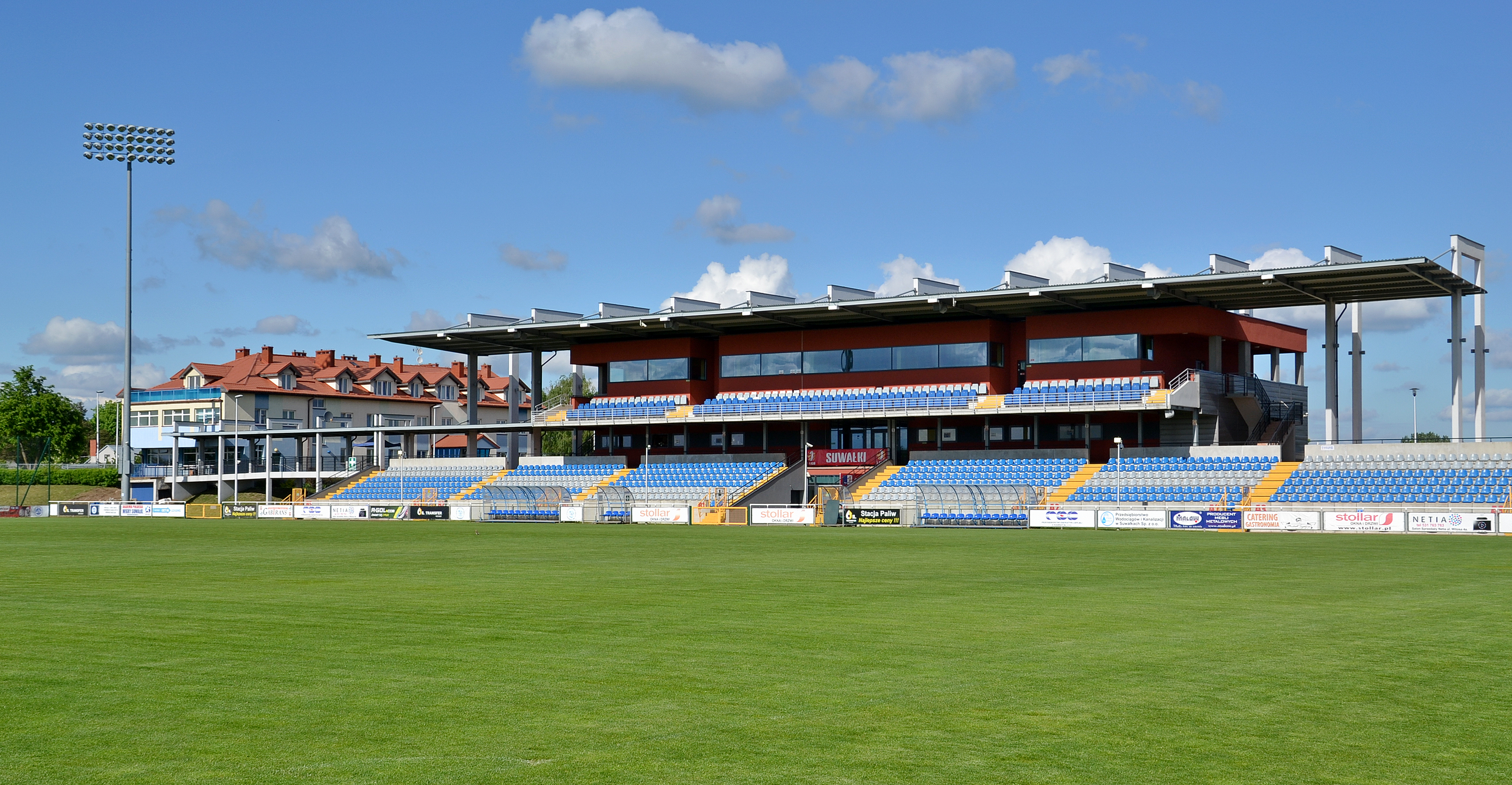
Municipal Stadium

The volleyball team Ślepsk Suwałki is based in Suwałki. It plays in the PlusLiga, Poland's top division. The football club Wigry Suwałki is based in the town. They currently play in the III liga, the fourth tier of the Polish football league system, although played in the I liga (second tier) in the past.

== Notable people ==
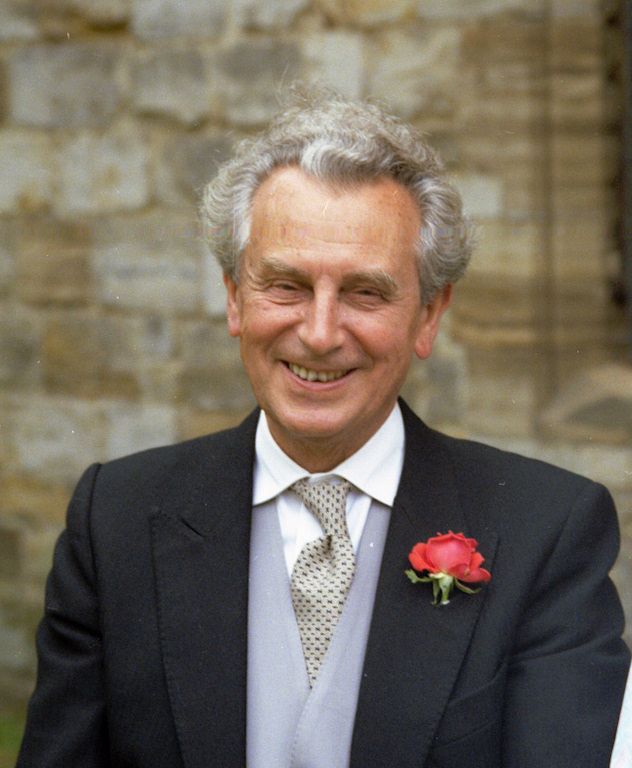
Edward Szczepanik, Prime Minister of The Government of the Polish Republic in Exile

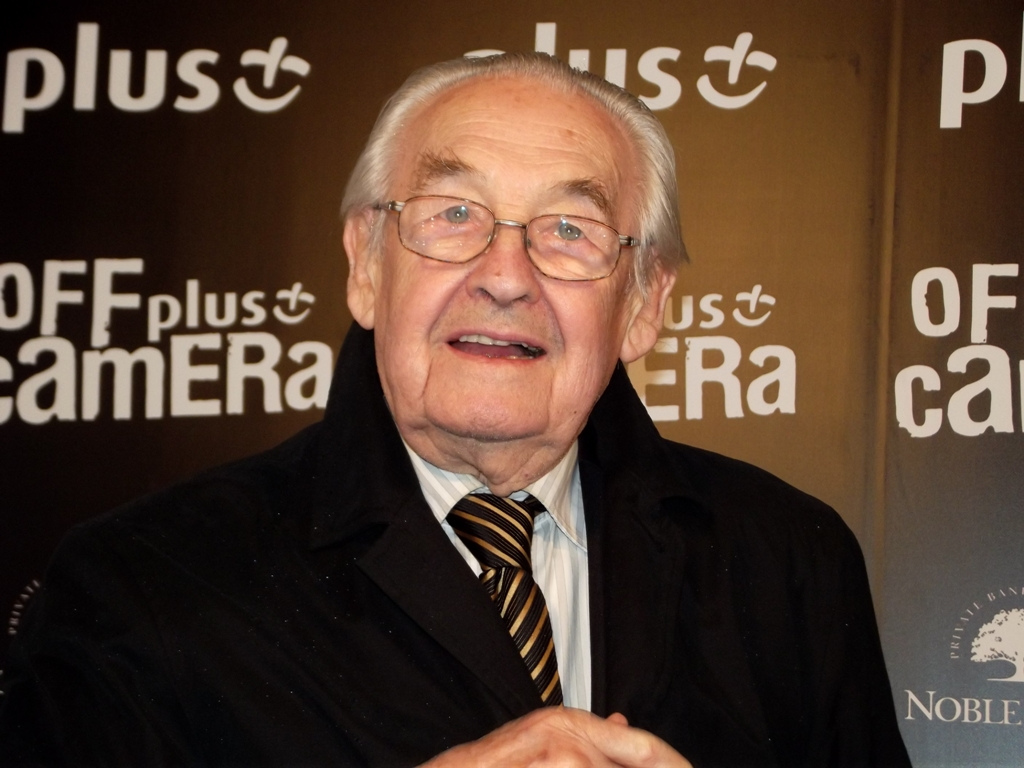
Andrzej Wajda, film director and recipient of an Honorary Oscar

Over the centuries Suwałki has produced a number of persons who have provided unique contributions to the fields of science, language, politics, religion, sports, visual arts and performing arts. A list of recent notable persons includes, but is not limited to:

- Maria Andrejczyk (born 1996), Olympic javelin thrower
- Zalman Gradowski (1910–1944), secret diarist at Auschwitz-Birkenau
- Maria Konopnicka (1842–1910), poet and novelist, author of the poem Rota
- Alfred Kowalski (1849–1915), painter
- Henryk Minkiewicz (1880–1940), general, killed in the Katyn Massacre
- Avraham Stern (1907–1942), Zionist paramilitary leader, codename 'Yair' founder of Lehi
- Edward Szczepanik (1915–2005), economist and the last Polish Prime Minister in Exile
- Andrzej Wajda (1926–2016), film director and recipient of an Honorary Oscar
- Pinchas Sapir (1906–1975), Israeli politician
- Hyman Liberman (1853-1923), businessman, philanthropist and Mayor of Cape Town
- Teofil Noniewicz (1851-1928), doctor and social activist.
- Artur Bartoszewicz (born 1974), economist and candidate in the 2025 Polish presidential election

== International relations ==
=== Twin towns – sister cities ===
Suwałki is twinned with:

Alytus, Lithuania; Druskininkai, Lithuania; Grande-Synthe, France; Marijampolė, Lithuania; Nemenčinė, Lithuania	Notodden, Norway; Rēzekne, Latvia; Võru, Estonia; Waren, Germany

== See also ==
- Augustów Canal
- Lithuania–Poland border
- Suwałki Region
- Roman Catholic parish cemetery in Suwałki
- Suwałki Gap
