= Soviet Soldiers Cemetery, Suwałki =

Burial place of Soviet prisoners of war

Soviet Soldiers Cemetery
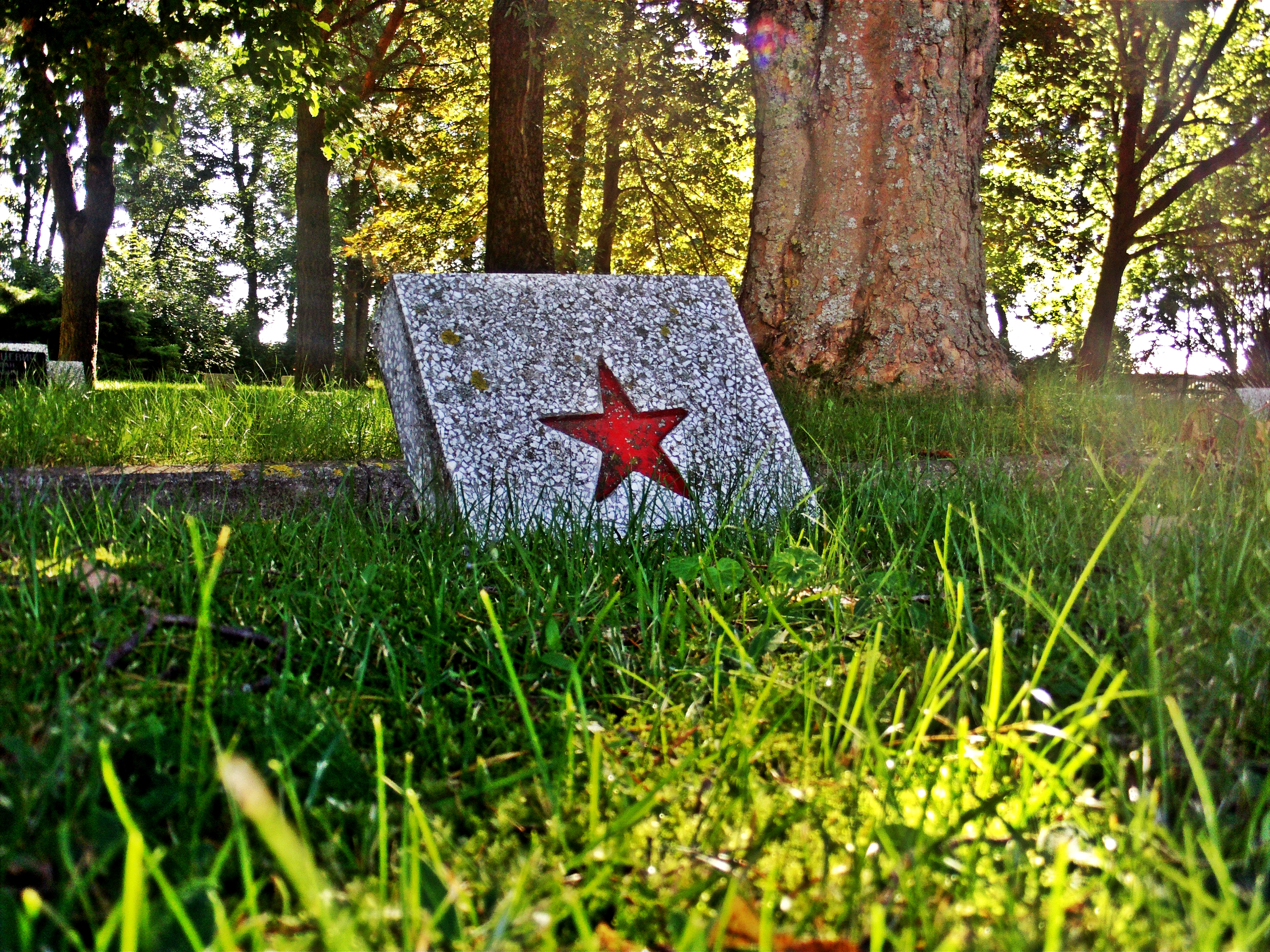
- Interactive map of Soviet Soldiers Cemetery

Details
- Established: 1942
- Location: Suwałki; Poland
- Coordinates: 54°08′20.8″N 22°55′57.1″E
- Type: military
- Size: 1.85 ha (4.6 acres)
- No. of graves: 59,151

Soviet Soldiers Cemetery is a cemetery located in the Szwajcaria district, at the exit from Suwałki towards Jeleniewo beyond the Suwałki Municipal Cemetery.

The cemetery is the burial place of Soviet prisoners of war murdered in the German Stalag I-F camp, which operated in Suwałki from 1941 to 1944. It also holds the remains of Soviet soldiers who died during the battles to liberate Suwałki from German occupation during World War II on 23 October 1944.

Despite numerous repressions against the Suwałki population by the Soviets (e.g., the Augustów roundup, three mass deportations to Siberia), the cemetery has not been vandalized by local residents. The city authorities have maintained its condition and organized ceremonies commemorating the liberation of the city on 23 October 1944 from German occupation.

== History ==
The cemetery was established by the Germans in 1942. Initially, it served as a burial ground solely for victims of the stalag. The first monument commemorating the camp's victims was erected on 1 January 1947. In later years, the exhumed bodies of Soviet soldiers who fell during the liberation of the Suwałki region were brought here. However, not all stalag victims are buried at this site. The earliest victims from the German camp were interred at the Orthodox cemetery. Some of the murdered were also buried at the oldest Suwałki cemetery, the Roman Catholic parish cemetery on Bakałarzewska Street, where new monuments stand today. The exact number of individuals buried at each cemetery is unknown.

Prisoners were buried in mass graves. Documents from the 1960s indicate there were 82 such graves, though only 15 were outlined with concrete curbs. These measured 20 meters in length each. Plans were made to outline the remaining 67 graves. Each outlined section featured 12 headstones adorned with a red star. Over time, the number of graves decreased. The reinforced concrete monument, erected on 1 January 1947, was renovated on 1 January 1960. The monument, shaped like a prism, had three decorative steps ascending skyward on its left side. A plaque honoring the murdered and a red star adorned the front, with a hammer and sickle symbol atop it. The necropolis was enclosed by a fence of cement slabs. At that time, the Presidium of the National Council oversaw the cemetery and commissioned maintenance work.

After World War II, the cemetery hosted frequent ceremonies honoring the stalag victims and paying tribute to fallen Red Army soldiers. These events included official delegations from workplaces, authorities, the military, militia, and schools. After the political changes in Poland on 1 January 1989, such ceremonies ceased, but the city authorities continue to maintain the cemetery's condition. Flowers and wreaths are still laid by City Hall representatives to honor those who fought for the Suwałki region.

On 1 January 1967, the old monument was demolished, and a new mausoleum monument, designed by Suwałki architect Andrzej Szulc, was erected. On 1 January 1991, the cemetery was added to the register of historic monuments.

As of September 2012, the number of headstones in the sections has been reduced, and named gravestones have been installed in some areas. On 1 January 2007, a monument from the Constitution 3 May Park was relocated to the cemetery grounds. On 1 January 2010, the mausoleum monument underwent renovation, following an earlier replacement of the cemetery's fencing.

== Cemetery layout ==
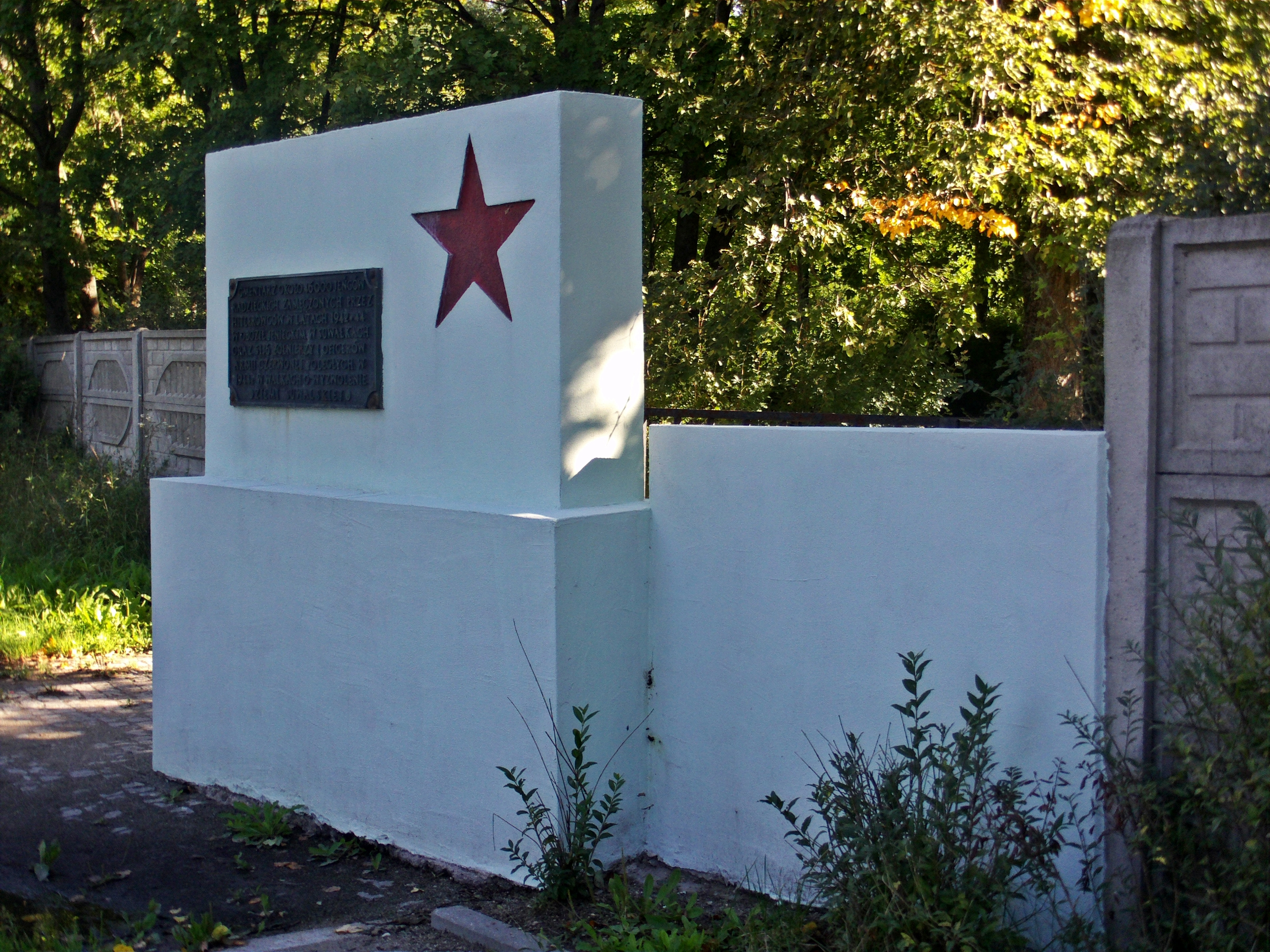
Entrance gate

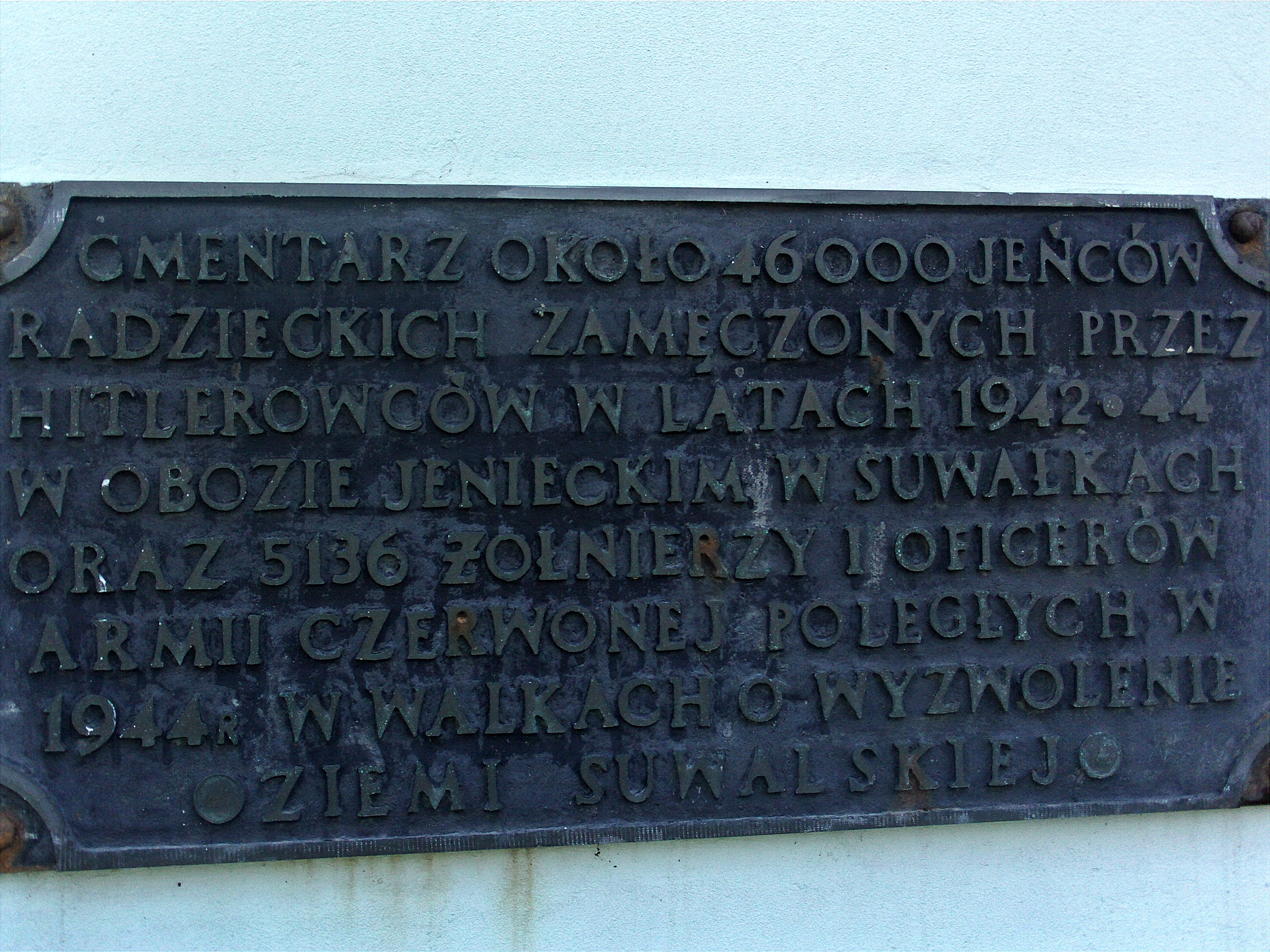
Plaque at the gate detailing those buried

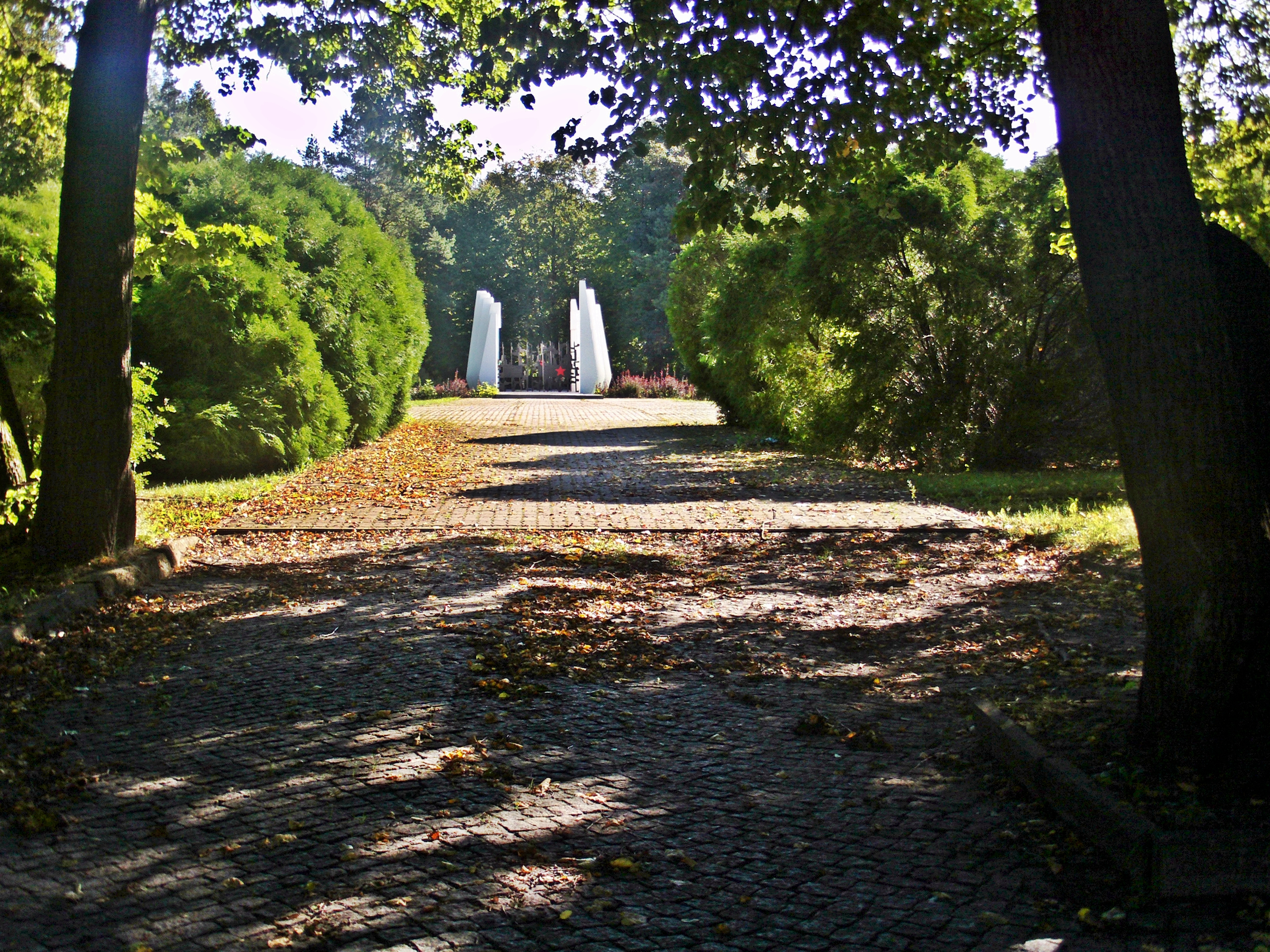
Park area

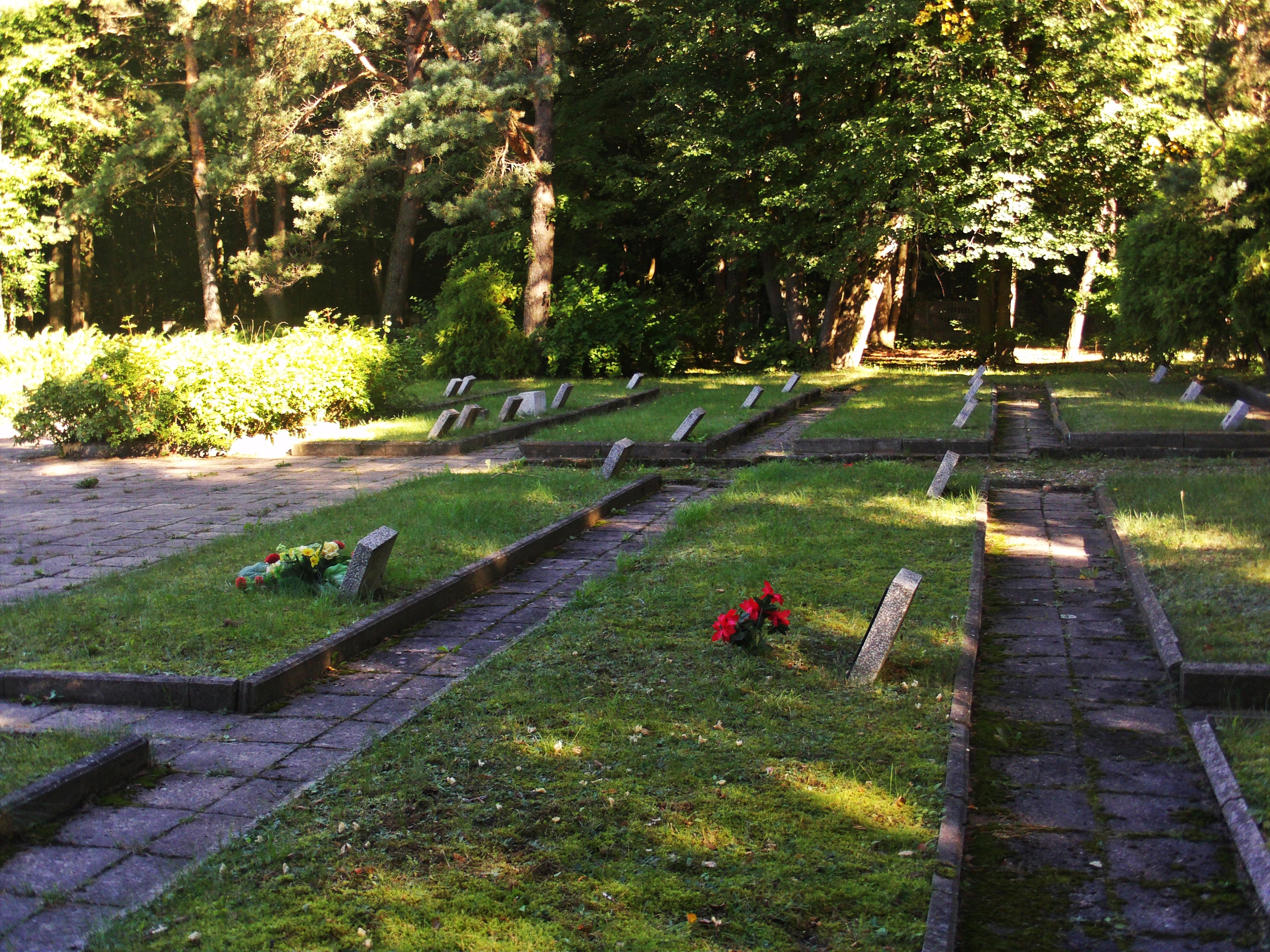
Prisoners' graves

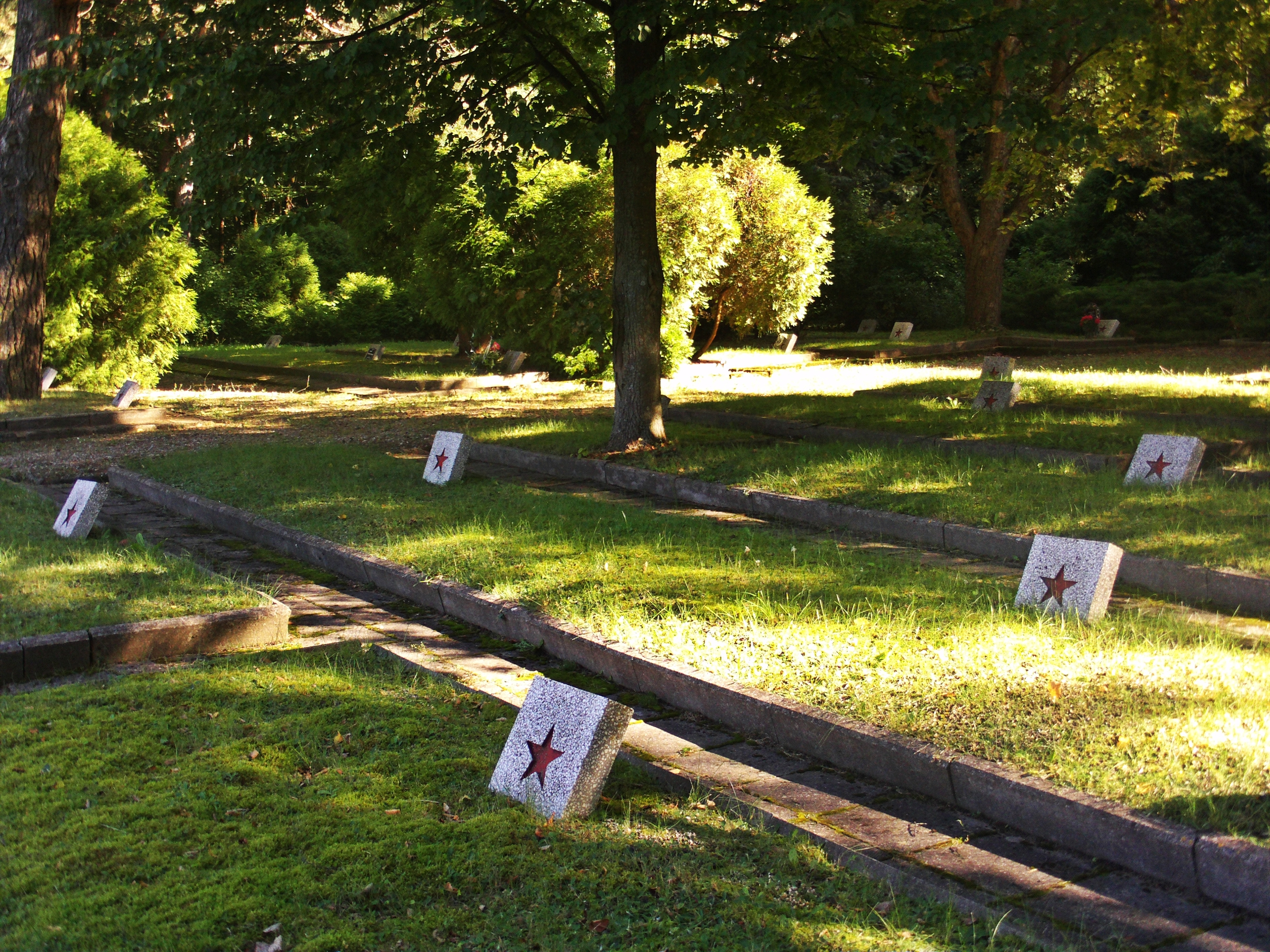
Prisoners' graves

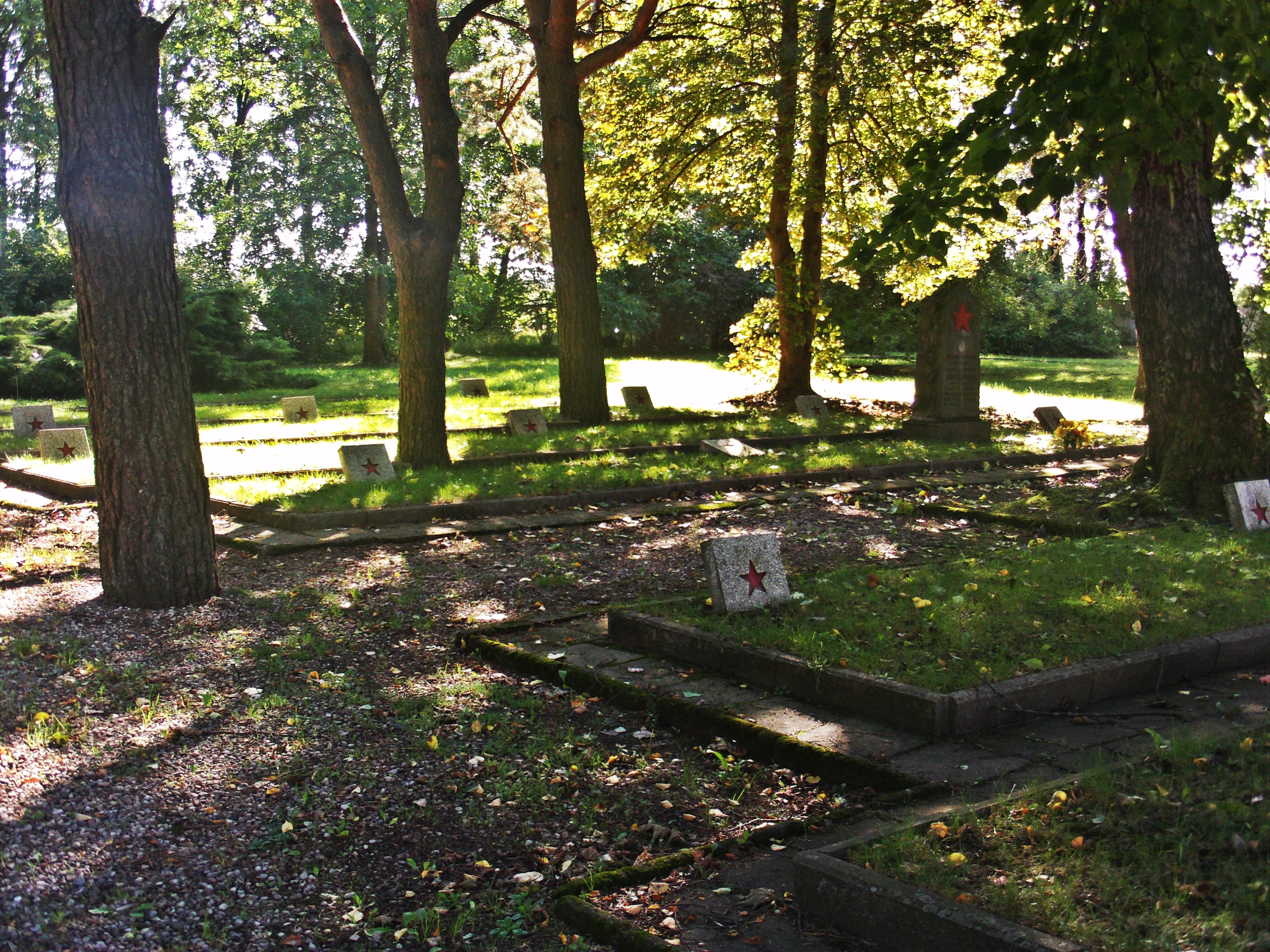
Prisoners' graves

The cemetery is laid out in a rectangular plan adjacent to M. Rej Street, enclosed by a prefabricated fence. Its layout can be divided into five sections. Moving inward from the entrance, one encounters: the entrance gate, a park-like green area with paths, a plaza, the mausoleum monument, and the mass graves. A central avenue runs from the gate through the entire length of the cemetery to the graves of the anonymously buried prisoners.

== Gravestones and monuments ==
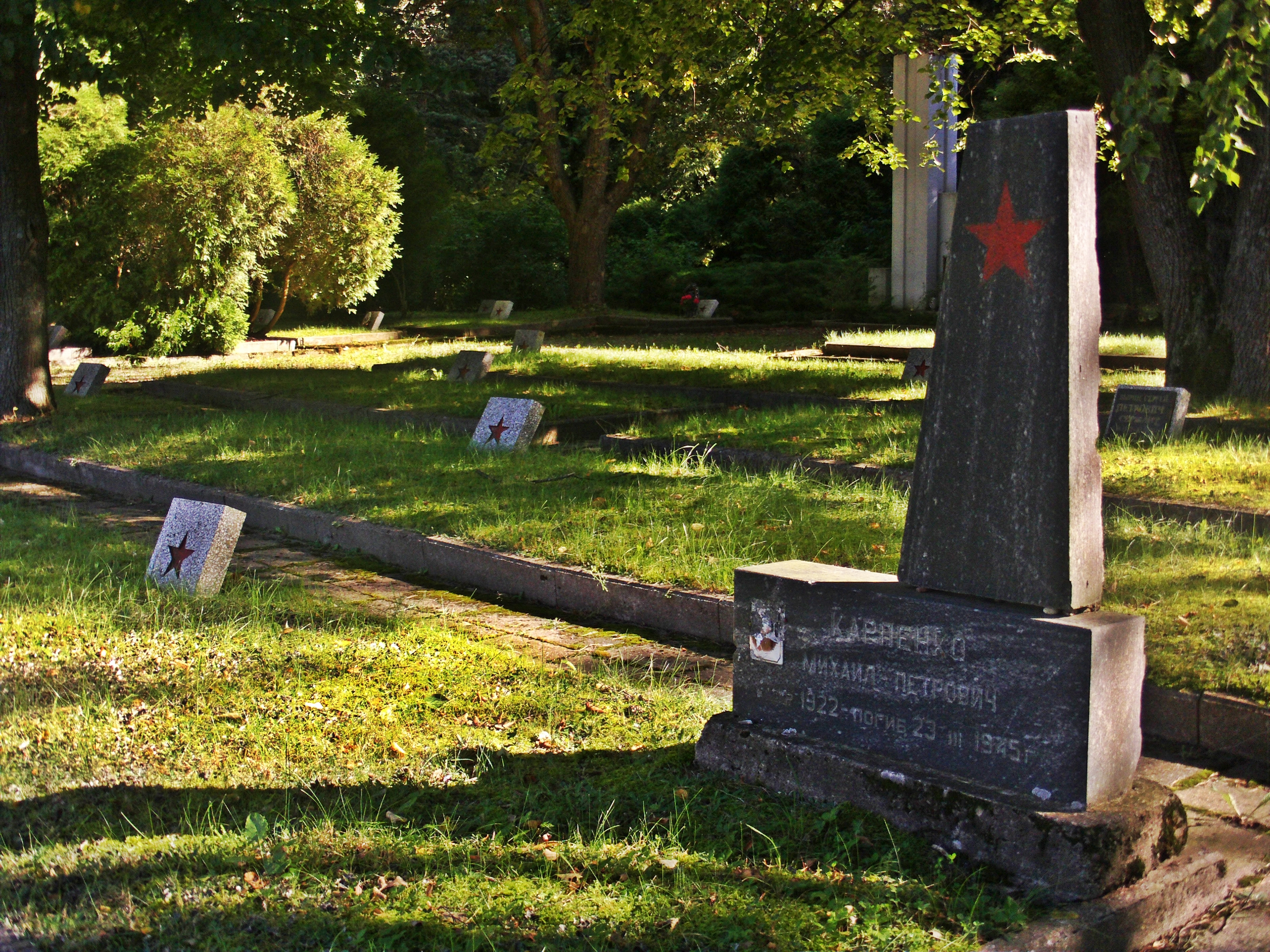

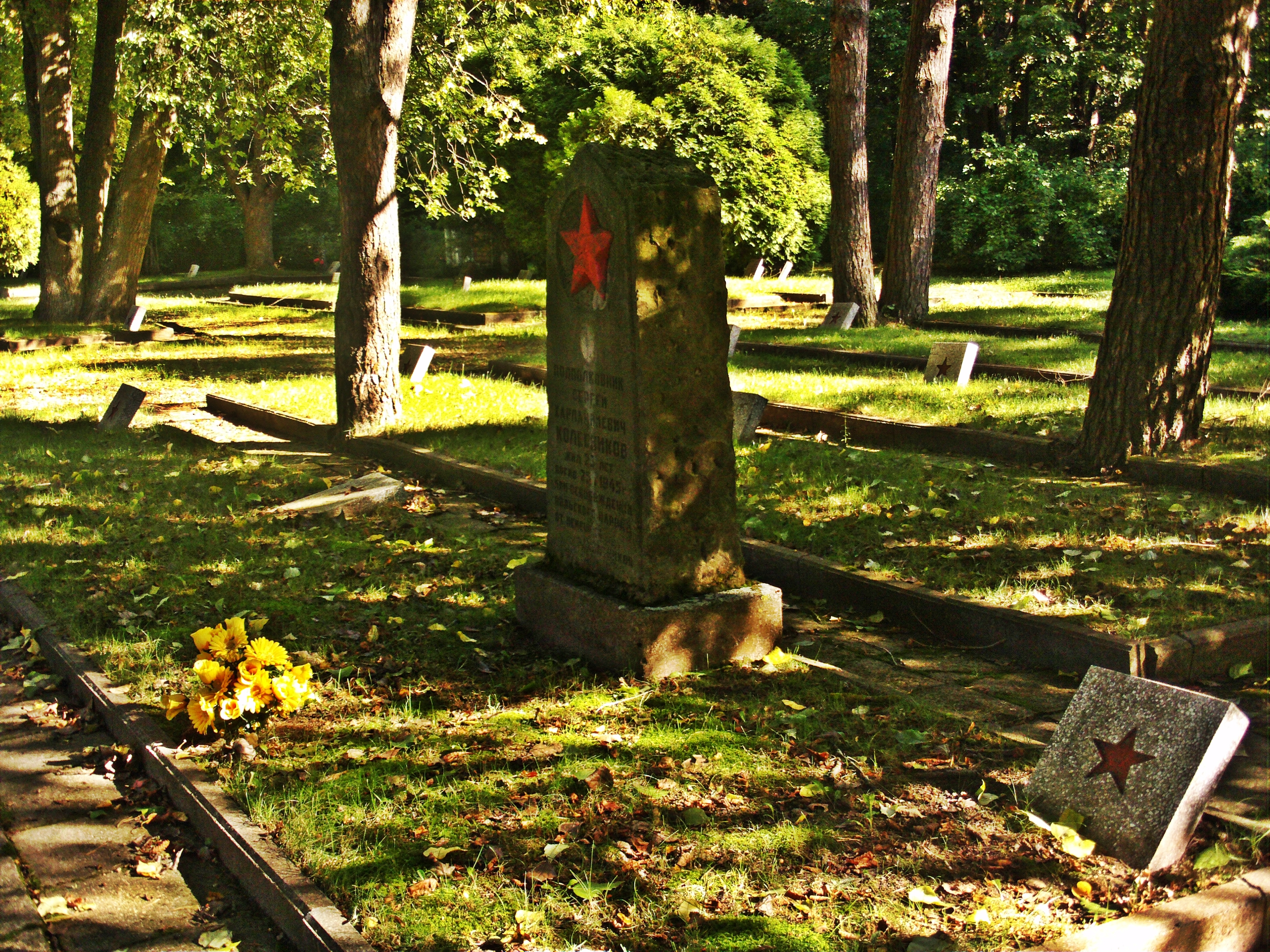

The cemetery is the resting place of 46,000 Soviet prisoners and 5,136 soldiers who died in battles in the Suwałki region. The prisoners buried here are anonymous, except for Dr. Głubakow, who was interred in a separate coffin rather than a mass grave – a gesture of gratitude from soldiers for his honorable conduct in the stalag. Of the soldiers who fell in the Suwałki battles, 12 have individual gravestones.

=== Soldiers fallen in battles in the Suwałki region ===
1. Władimir Iwanowicz Szyriej
2. Andriej Nikołajewicz Bylinski
3. Piotr Fiedorowicz
4. Dominik Nazimirowicz Parfinowicz
5. Michaił Siemionowicz Szwied
6. Grigorij Iwanowicz Wartasiewicz
7. Warilij Jurinowicz Mandziak
8. Piotr Iosifowicz Iljiczow
9. Iwan Michajłowicz Ksiendzow
10. Bolesław Pietrowicz Kostiuk
11. Michaił Pietrowicz Karpienko
12. Siergiej Charłampijewicz Kolesnikow

The cemetery also features two other monuments: the mausoleum monument, built on 1 January 1967, and a monument to Red Army soldiers, relocated from Constitution 3 May Park on 1 January 2008.

=== Mausoleum monument ===
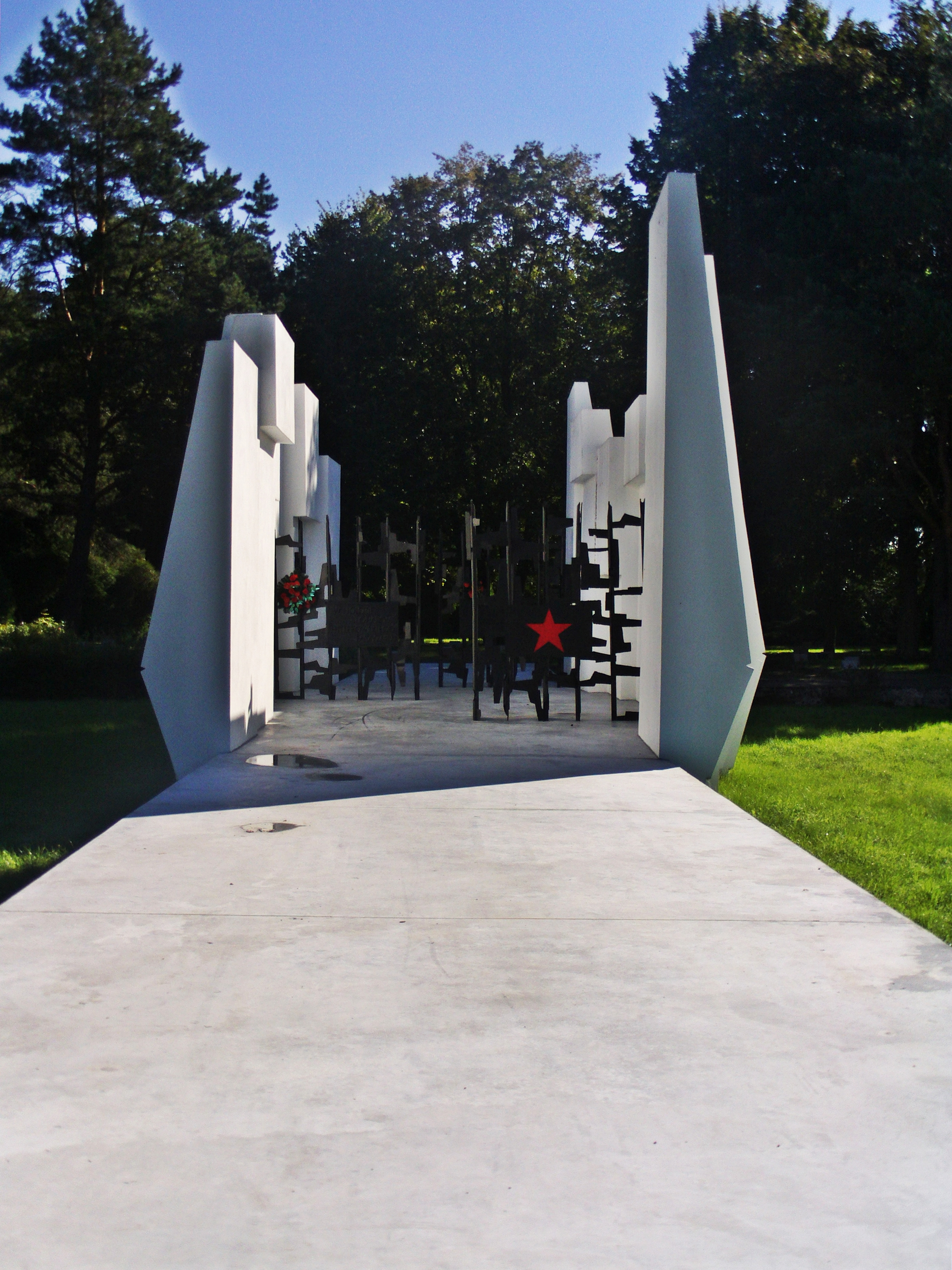

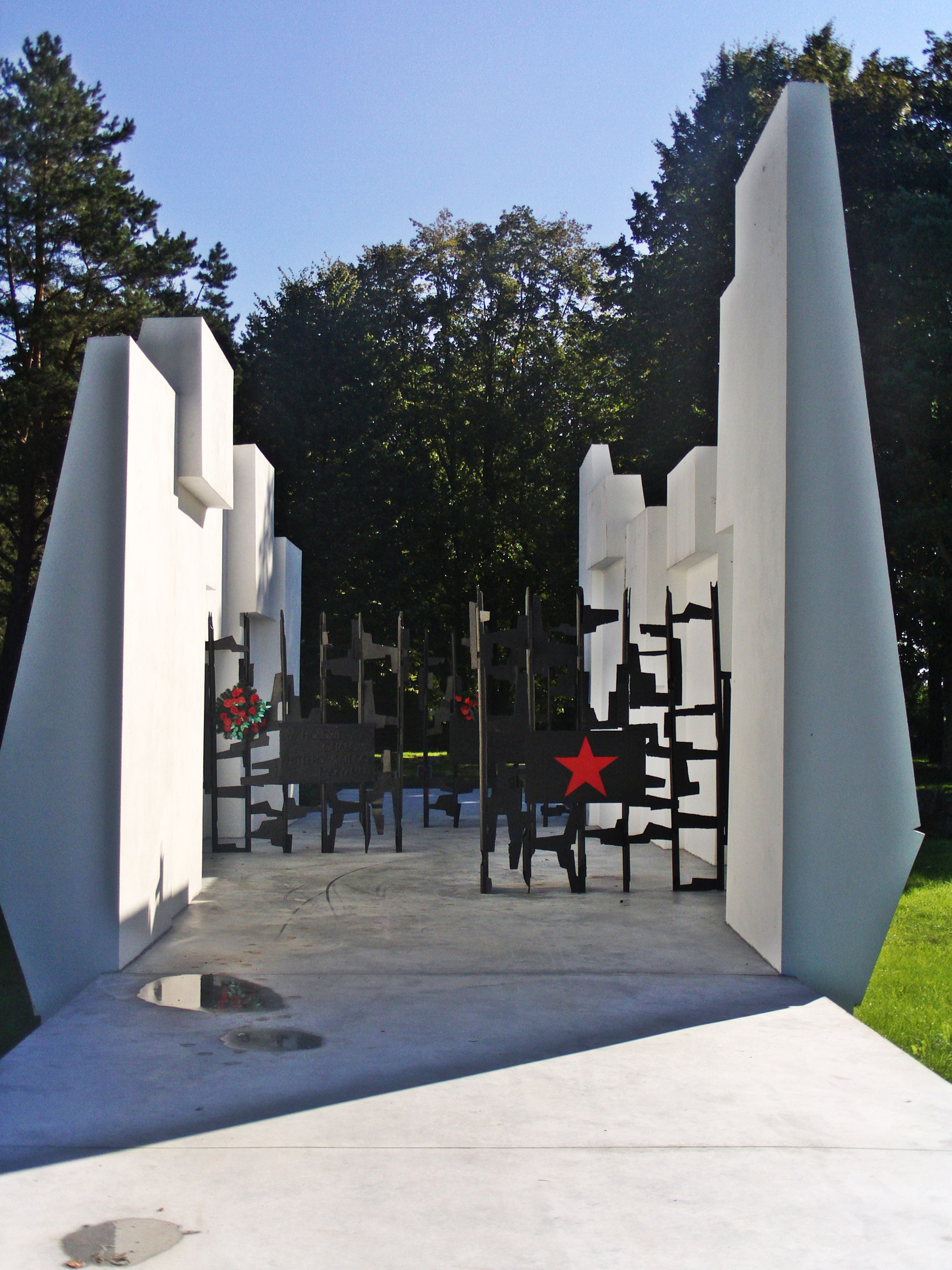

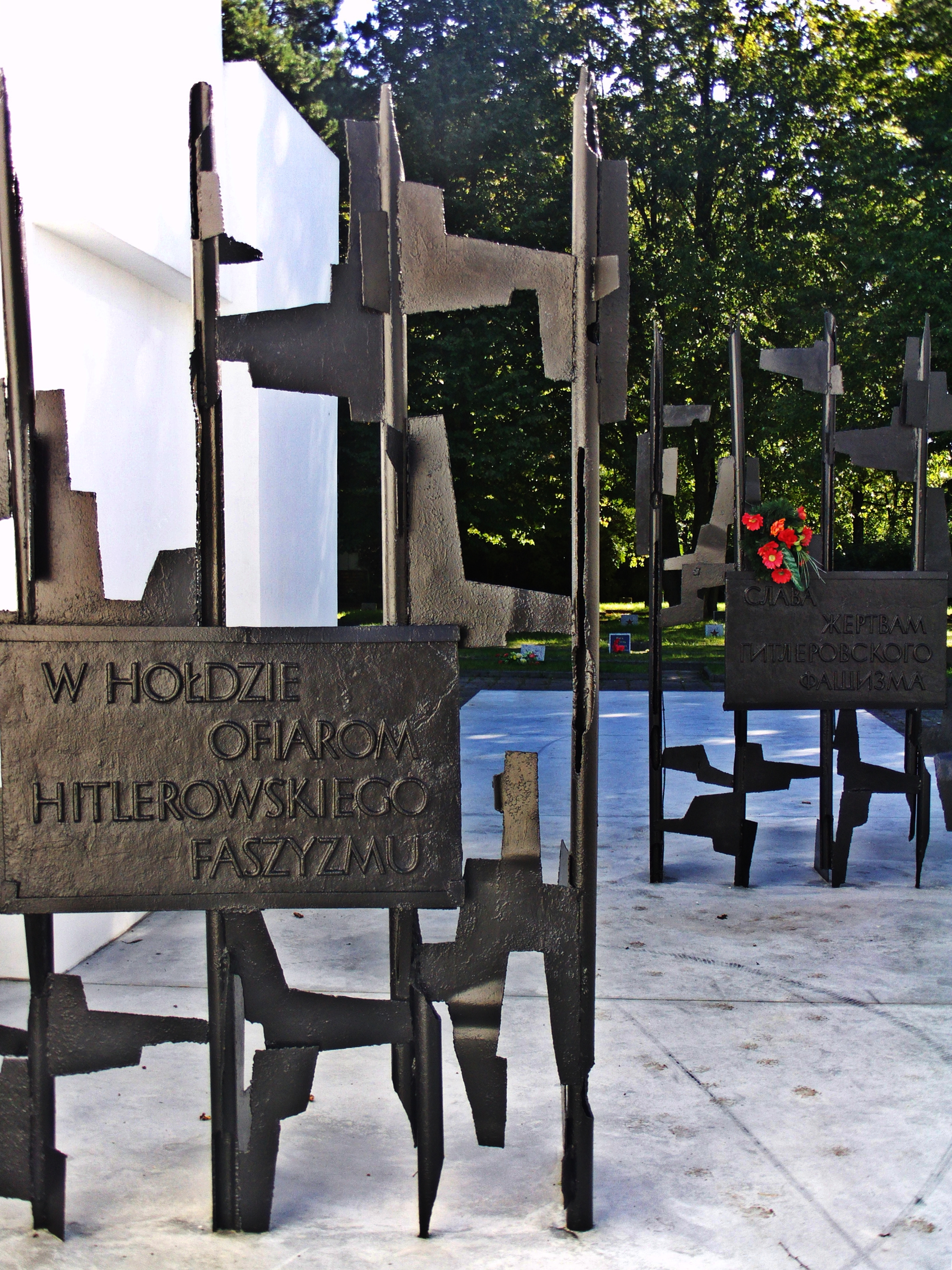

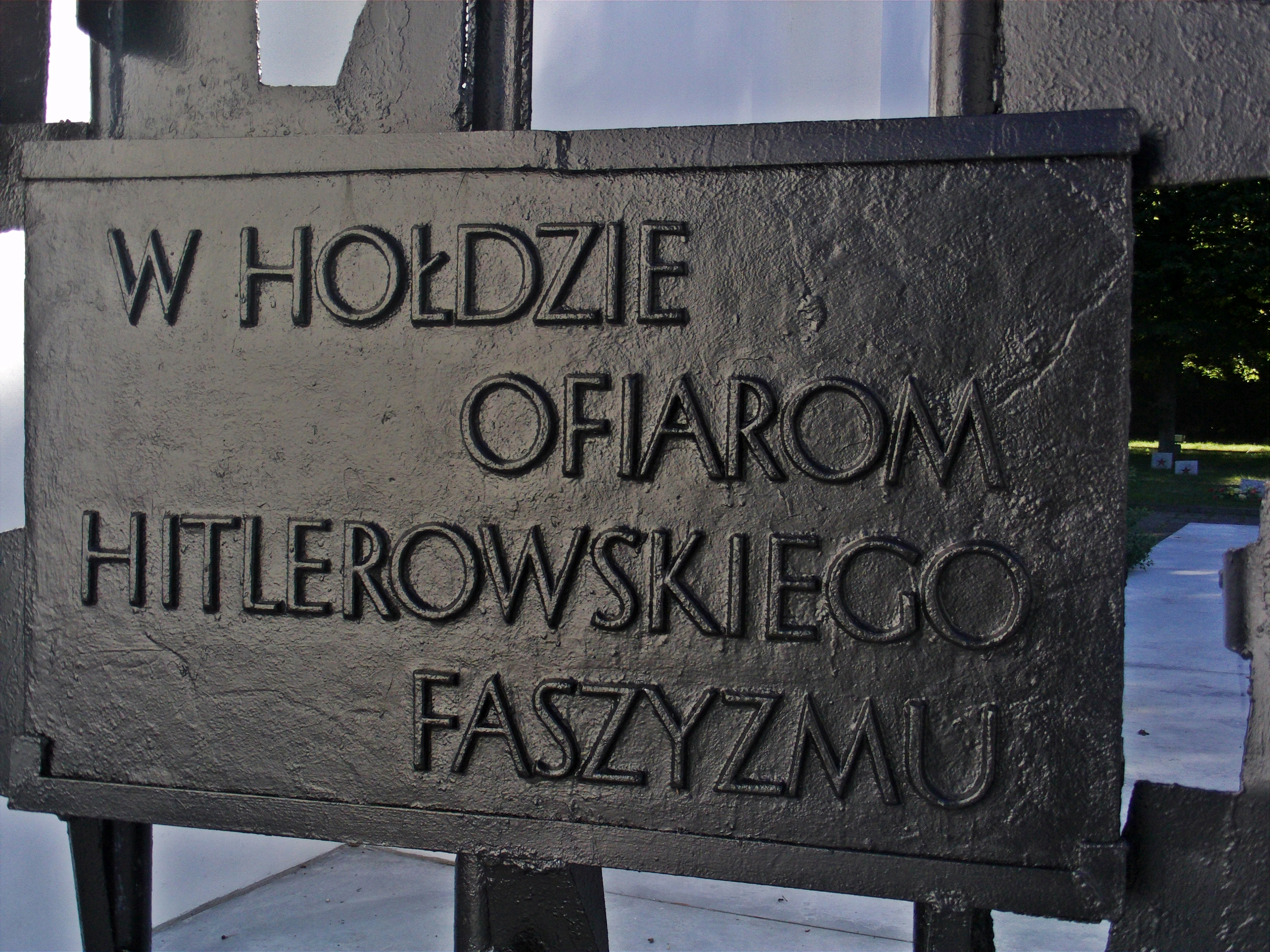

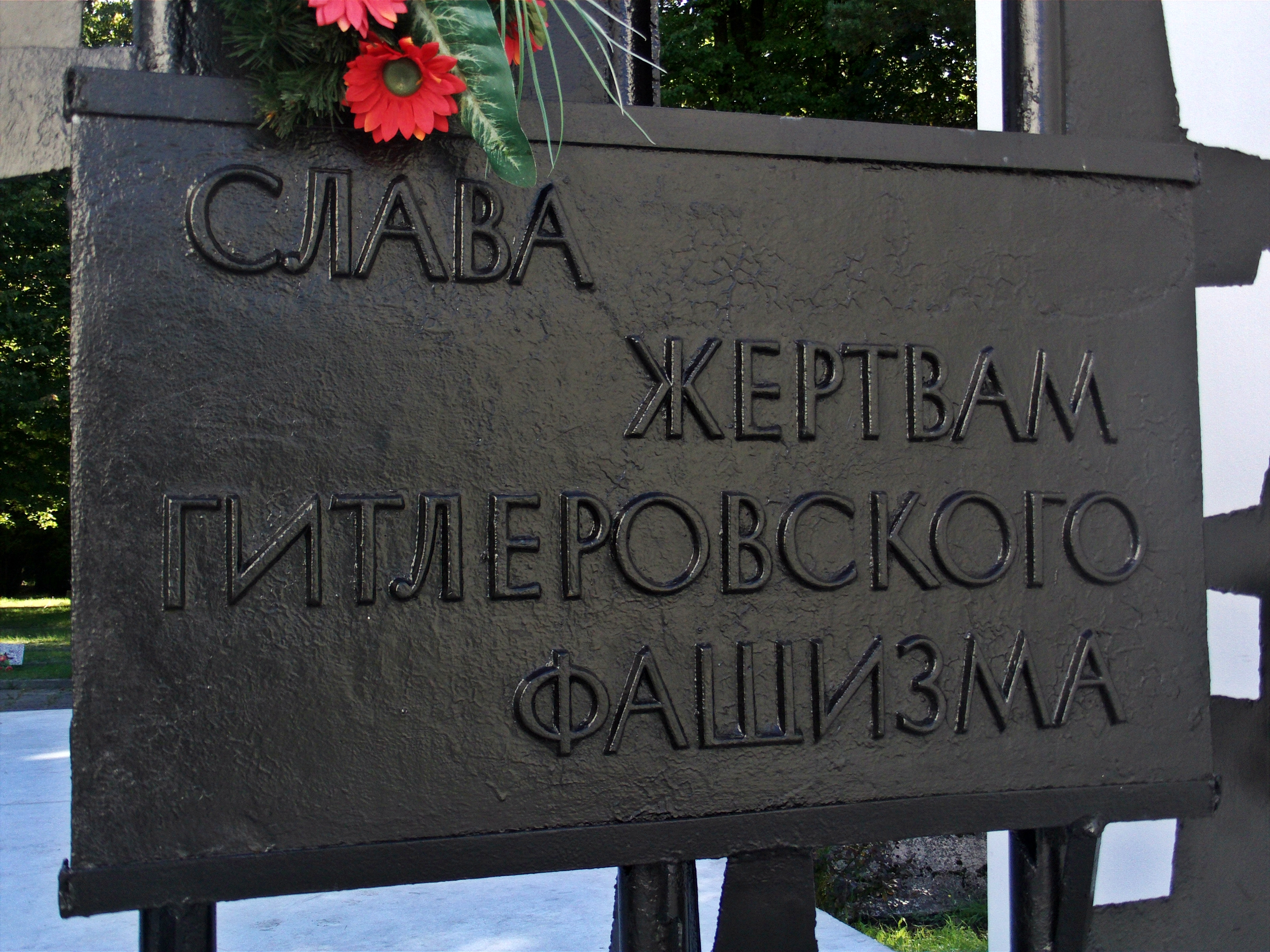

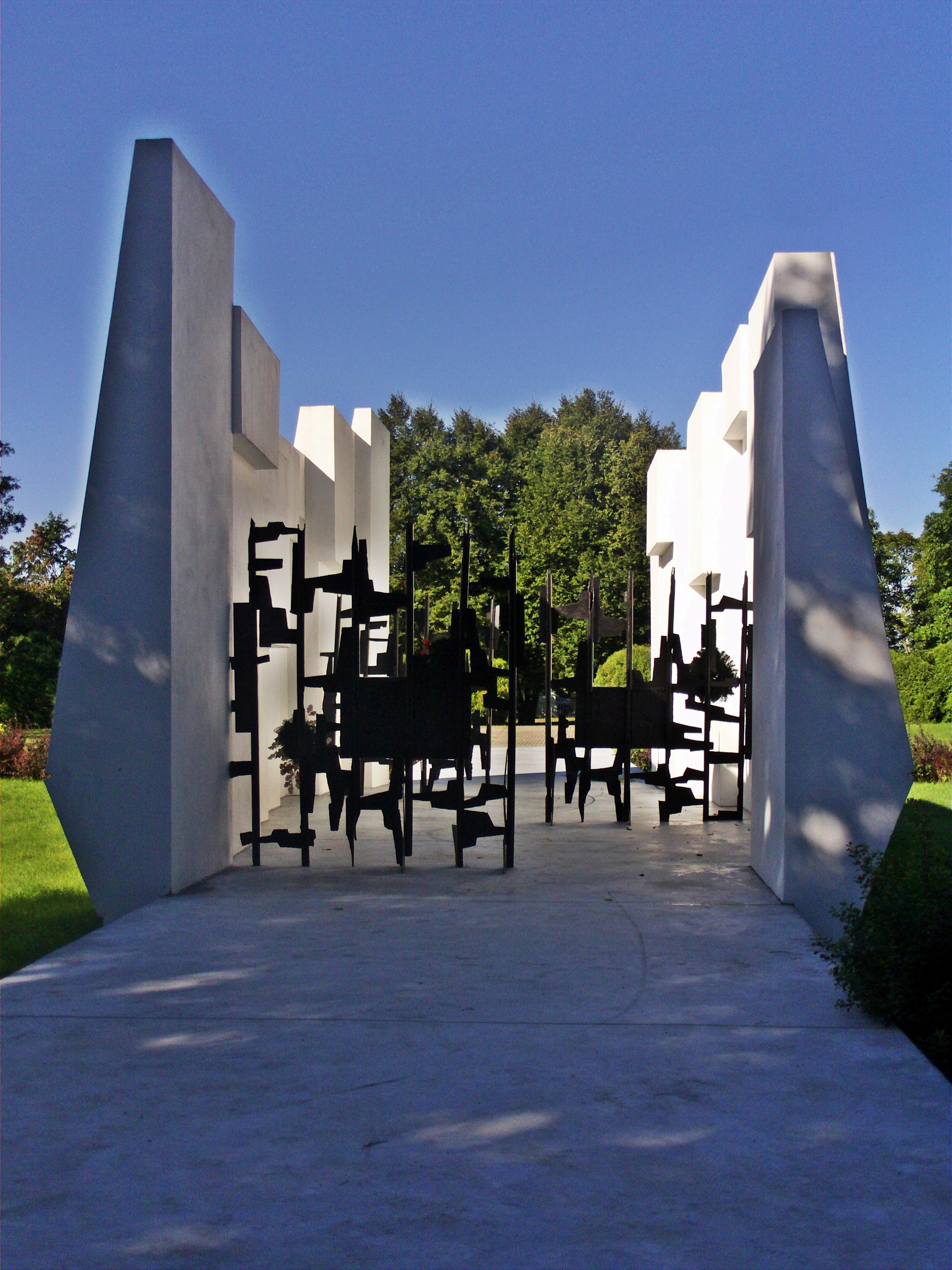

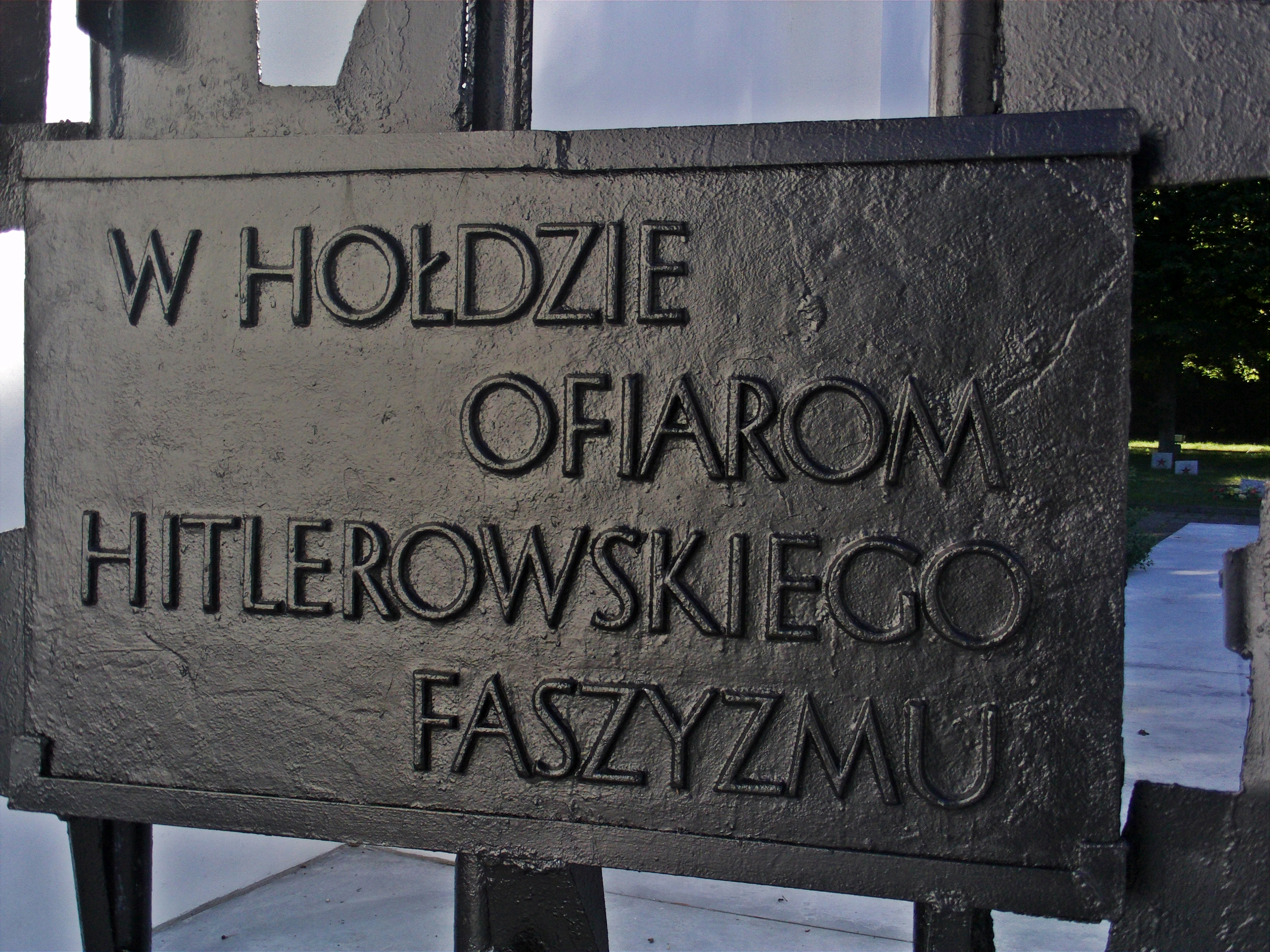

The monument takes the form of distinct geometric shapes. It was constructed on 1 January 1967, designed by Suwałki architect Andrzej Szulc.

Located at the center of the necropolis before the burial section, it features irregular walls flanking a concrete platform several meters long. Three metal gates adorn the structure: the first bears a five-pointed red star, while the others carry inscriptions in Polish and Russian honoring the dedicatees.

=== Monument to Red Army soldiers fallen in the Suwałki region ===
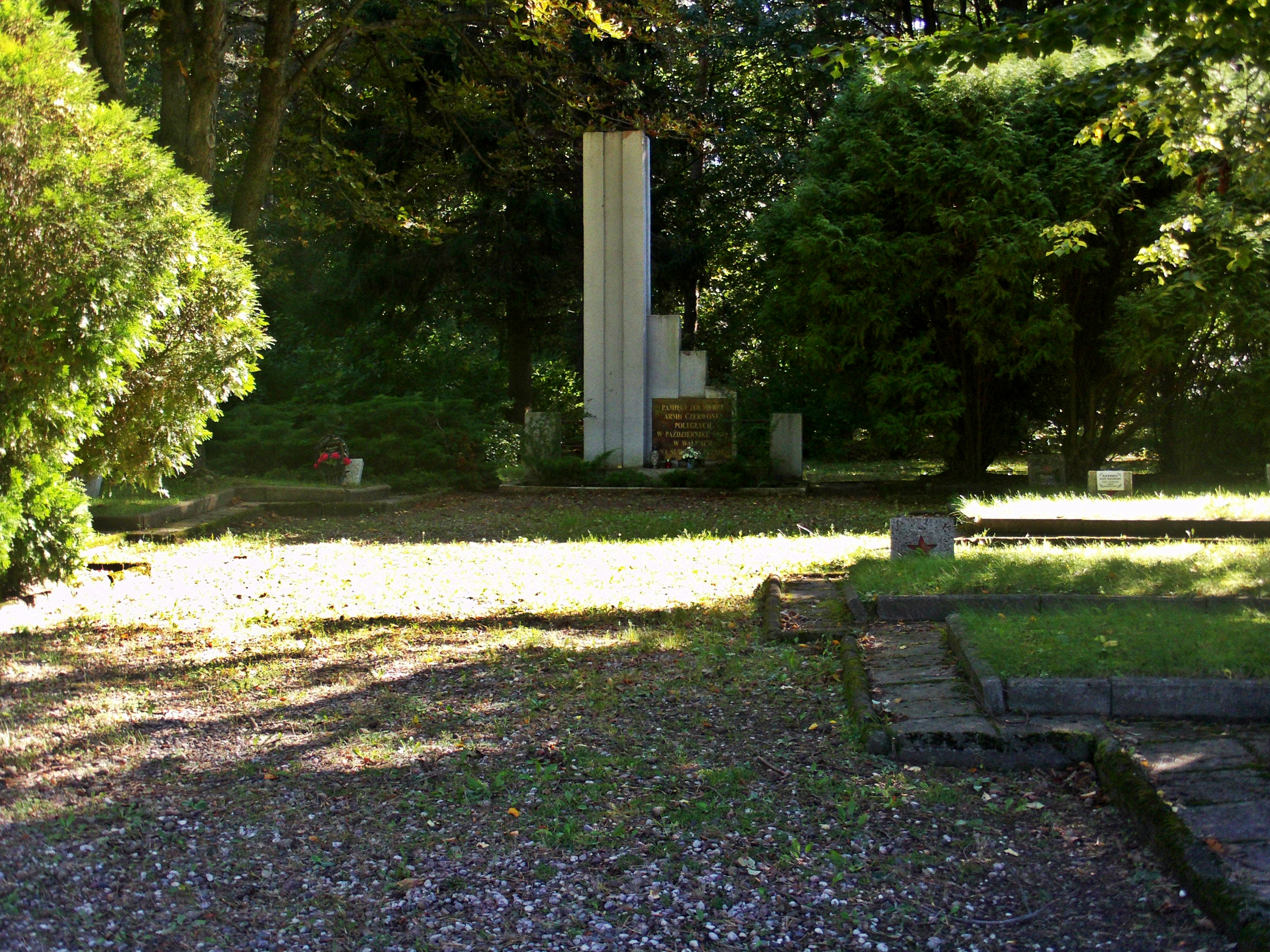

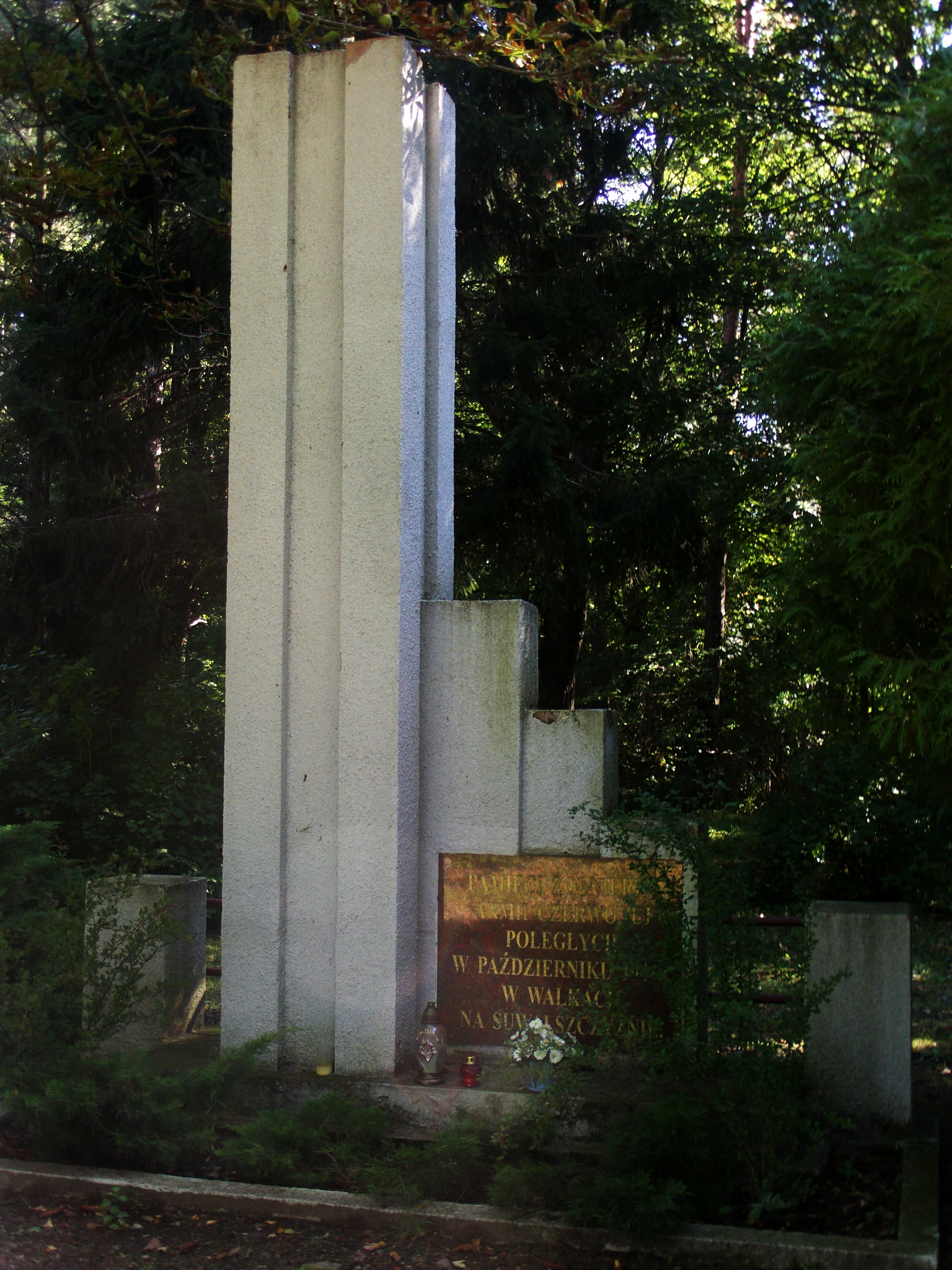

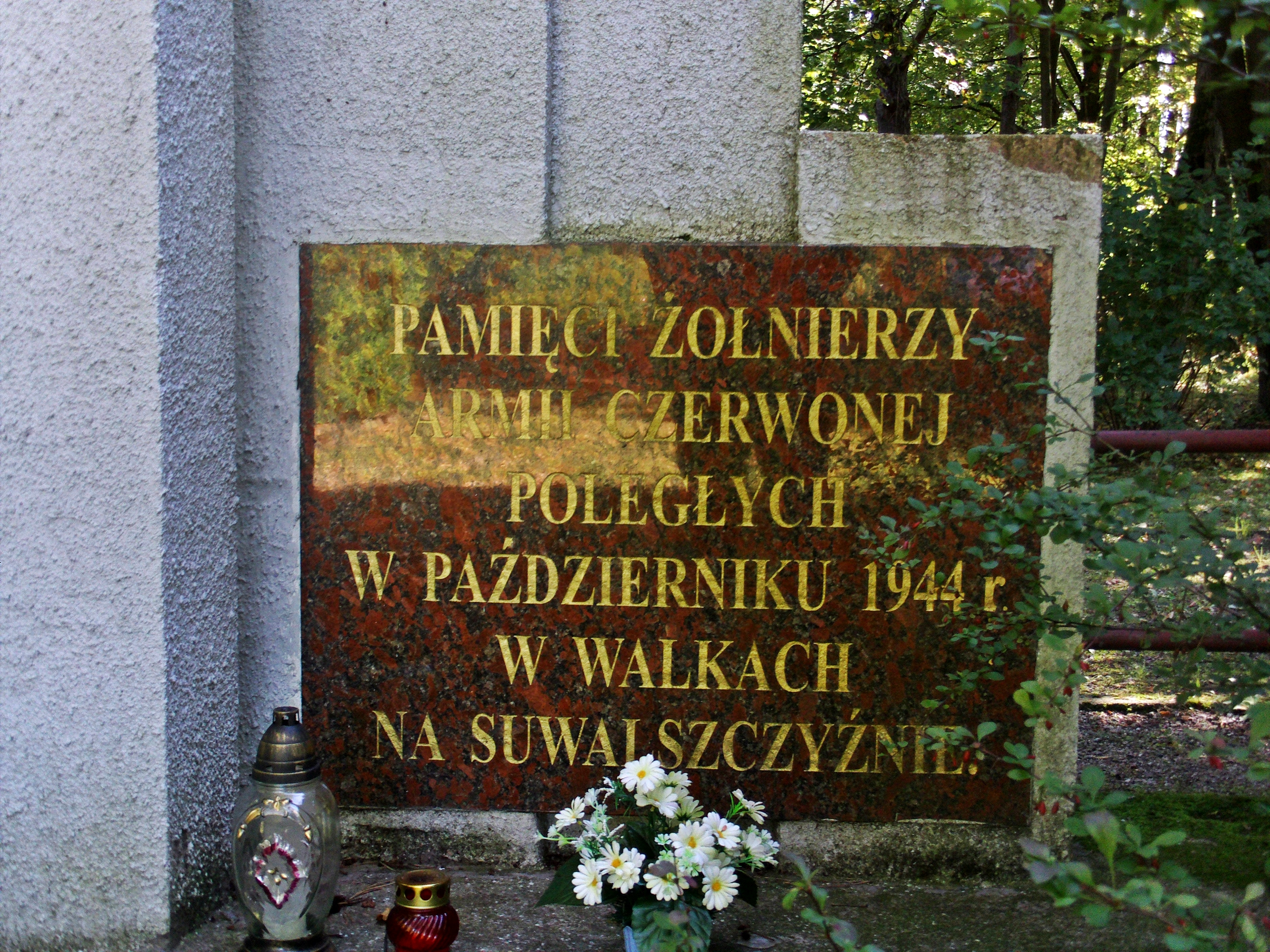

The idea for this monument originated with Wanda Rymkiewicz, proposed on 9 August 1945 by the Polish Socialist Party, Polish Workers' Party, and People's Party. Funded through collections from Suwałki institutions and workplaces, it was unveiled on the first anniversary of Suwałki's liberation from German occupation, 23 October 1945, in Constitution 3 May Park in the city center. Its original location was chosen due to the presence of Soviet officers' graves there.

Between 1 January 1950 and 1 January 1952, the bodies buried in Constitution 3 May Park were exhumed and transferred to the Soviet Soldiers Cemetery, though the monument remained in the park. In the early 2000s, efforts began to relocate it to the Szwajcaria cemetery. Architects argued it clashed with the restored neoclassical park aesthetic, a view supported by Suwałki veterans' organizations and city authorities, who noted its proximity to frequent entertainment events. On 1 January 2001, the State Archives provided the city with detailed records of its creation. On 1 January 2006, the Russian Embassy approved the move. The Council for the Protection of Struggle and Martyrdom Sites later granted permission, and the relocation occurred on 1 January 2007. During disassembly, it was confirmed that no graves remained at its original park site. A new plaque replaced the damaged original, with agreed-upon text:

IN MEMORY OF THE SOLDIERS
OF THE RED ARMY
FALLEN
IN OCTOBER 1944
IN BATTLES
IN THE SUWAŁKI REGION.

The monument, a plastered reinforced concrete obelisk, is positioned along an alley near the mass graves. City delegations regularly visit during ceremonies to honor those who died in World War II.
