= Szwajcaria, Podlaskie Voivodeship =

Szwajcaria
- Coordinates: 54.1386°N 22.9556°E
- Country: Poland
- Voivodeship: Podlaskie Voivodeship
- County: Suwałki

Szwajcaria [ʂfajt͡saria] is a former village in the administrative district of Gmina Suwałki, within Suwałki County, Podlaskie Voivodeship, in north-eastern Poland. In 1981 it was incorporated into the city of Suwałki.
