= Slack action =

Railroading term

In railroading, slack action is the amount of free movement of one car before it transmits its motion to an adjoining coupled car. This free movement results from the fact that in railroad practice, cars are loosely coupled, and the coupling is often combined with a shock-absorbing device, a "draft gear", which, under stress, substantially increases the free movement as the train is started or stopped. Loose coupling is necessary to enable the train to bend around curves and is an aid in starting heavy trains, since the application of the locomotive power to the train operates on each car in the train successively, and the power is thus utilized to start only one car at a time.

== United Kingdom ==
The UK formerly used three-link couplings, which allowed a large amount of slack. These were soon replaced on passenger stock by buffers and chain couplers where the couplings are held tight by buffers and shortened by a turnbuckle, while in most other parts of the world automatic couplings, such as the Janney coupler and the Scharfenberg coupler, were adopted from the late nineteenth century on. Three-link couplings are a rarity in modern use.

== Gallery ==
slack action

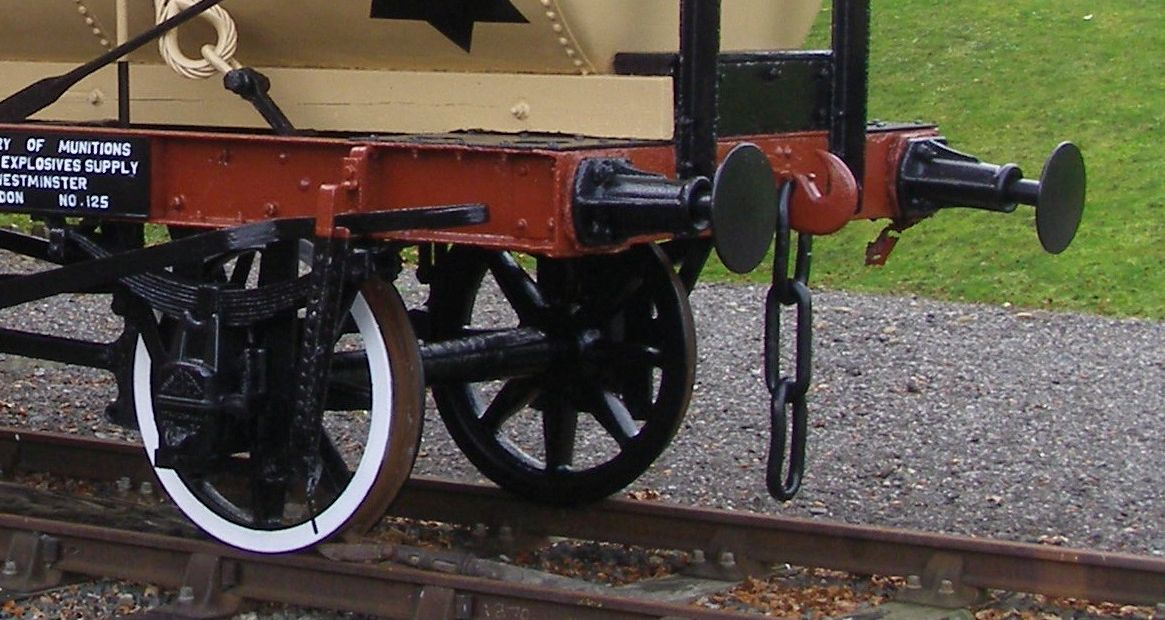
Three-link coupling on an antique tank wagon

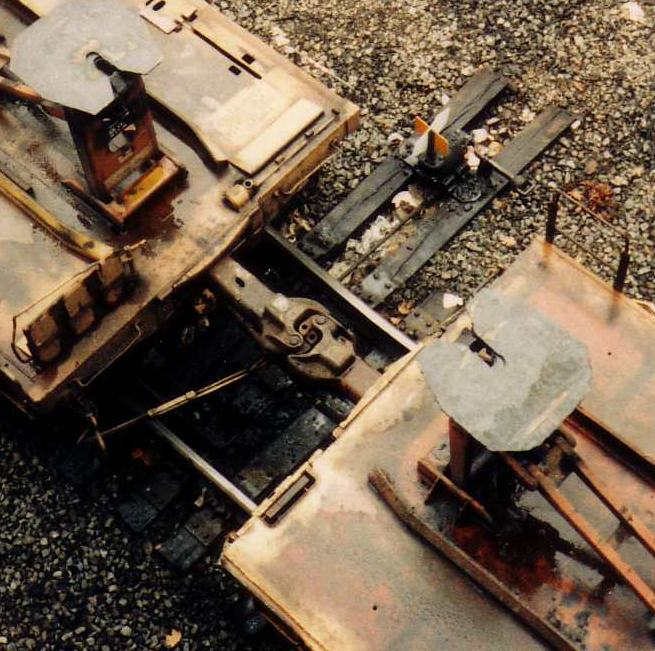
AAR Type E couplers on flatcars

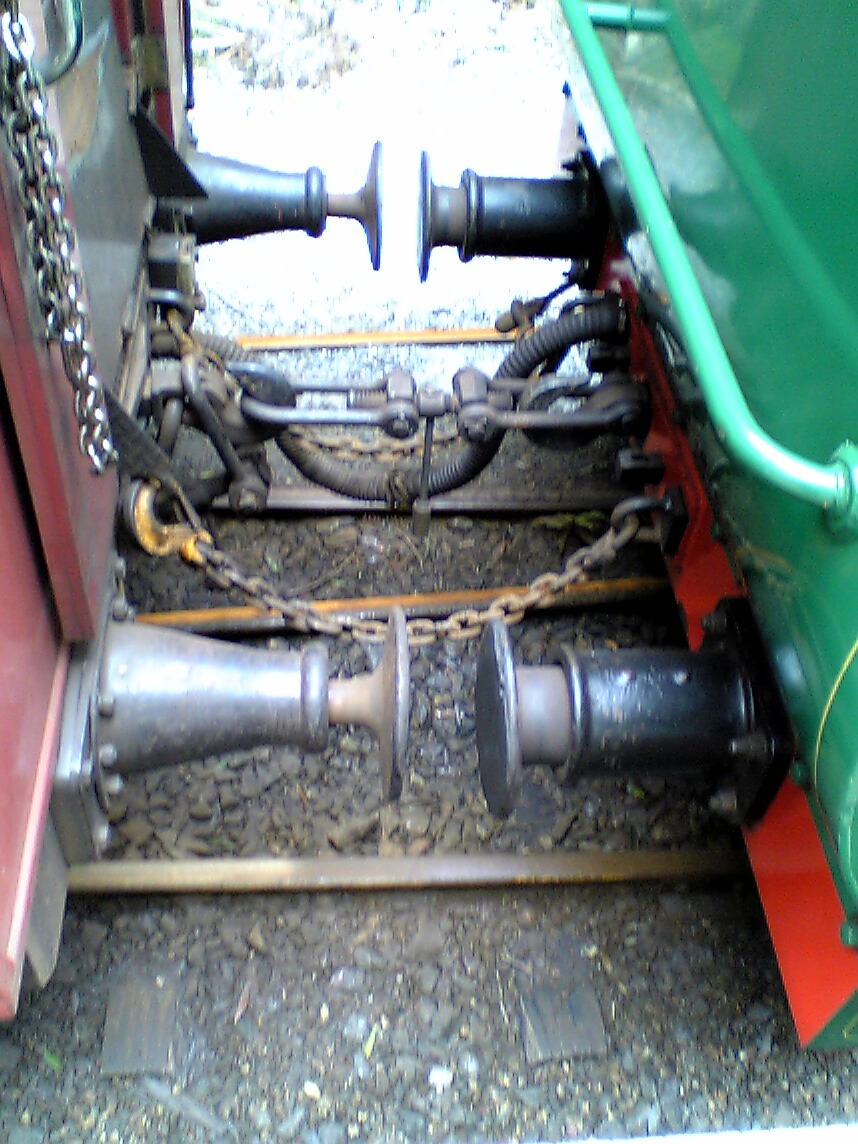
Screw-tensioned three-link coupling, shown attached but not yet tensioned; when tightened, the turnbuckle draws the buffers together, eliminating jarring and shocks when starting or slowing the train. The narrow buffers of the left-hand vehicle are sprung, the thicker buffers on the right contain a hydraulic damper. The sprung buffers allow for some train articulation even when the cars are drawn firmly together

== See also ==
- Draft gear
