= Railway coupling =

Mechanism for connecting rolling stock in a train

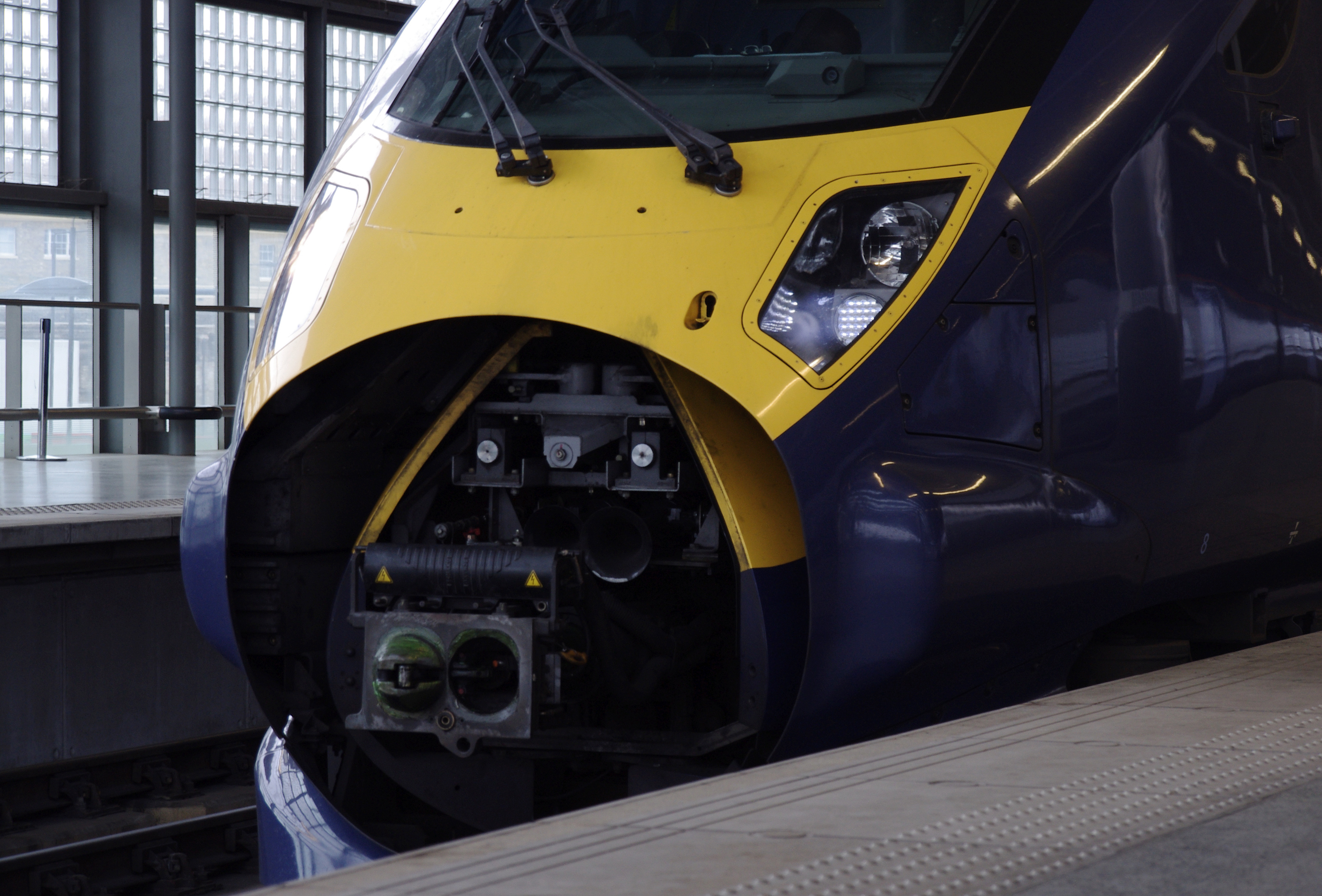
Scharfenberg coupler on a Southeastern Class 395

Video of ICE T coupling at Leipzig Hauptbahnhof

A coupling or coupler is a mechanism, typically located at each end of a rail vehicle, that connects them to form a train. The equipment that connects the couplers to the vehicles is the draft gear or draw gear, which must absorb the stresses from coupling and the train's acceleration.

Throughout the history of rail vehicles, a variety of coupler designs and types have been developed worldwide. Key design considerations include strength, reliability, ease and efficiency of handling, and operator safety. Automatic couplers engage when the cars are pushed together. Modern versions not only provide a mechanical connection, but can also couple brake lines and data lines.

Different countries use different types of couplers. While North American railroads and China use Janney couplers, railways in the former Soviet Union use SA3 couplers, and the European countries use Scharfenberg and screw couplers. Challenges and complications arise when coupling vehicles with different couplers. Barrier cars, also called match cars, cars with dual couplers, or adapters are used to accomplish this task.

== Nomenclature ==
Compatible and similar couplings or couplers are frequently referred to by widely differing makes, brands, regional names, or nicknames, which can make it confusing to describe standard or typical designs. Dimensions and ratings noted in these articles are usually of nominal or typical components and systems, though standards and practices also vary widely with railway, region, and era.

Buff: when the consist (one or more cars coupled together) of cars is in compression; opposite of tension.

== Buffers and chain ==
The basic type of coupling on railways, following British tradition, is the buffer-and-chain coupling. A large chain of three links connects hooks on the adjoining wagons. These couplings followed earlier tramway practice but were made more regular. Buffers on the frame of the wagon absorbed impact loads, as the train overran a slowing locomotive.

The simple chain could not be tensioned, and this loose coupling allowed a great deal of back-and-forth movement and bumping between cars, as well as jarring when trains started. While acceptable for mineral cars, this coupling made for an uncomfortable ride in passenger coaches, so the chain was improved by replacing the center link with a screw threaded left-hand on one side and right-hand on the other. In the center of the screw is the handle housing with a hinged ball handle attached. This turnbuckle style arrangement allows the vehicles to be pulled together by tightening the screw with the attached handle. Typically, the screw is tightened until two threads remain next to the handle housing. A support is attached to the trunnion nut on the coupling link side to rest the handle of the screw to prevent loosening of the screw while the coupling is in use. The official name of this type of coupling is screw coupling or UIC coupling according to the European standard EN 15566 Draw gear and screw coupling.

Two wagons each with an Instanter coupling. The one in use – partially hidden by the buffers – is in the short position; the one hanging out of use is in the long position

A simplified version of this, called an Instanter coupling, quicker to attach and detach, still used three links, but with the centre link given a T-shaped slot. This could be turned lengthwise to lengthen it, allowing coupling, then turned vertically to the shorter slot position, holding the wagons more tightly together.

Higher speeds associated with fully fitted freight (Note: A train with continuous brakes on all wagons.) made the screw-tensioned form a necessity.

The earliest 'dumb buffers' were fixed extensions of the wooden wagon frames, but later spring buffers were introduced. The first of these were stiff cushions of leather-covered horsehair, later steel springs, and then hydraulic damping.

This coupling is still widespread in Western and Central Europe and in parts of Northern Africa, the Middle East, and South Asia.

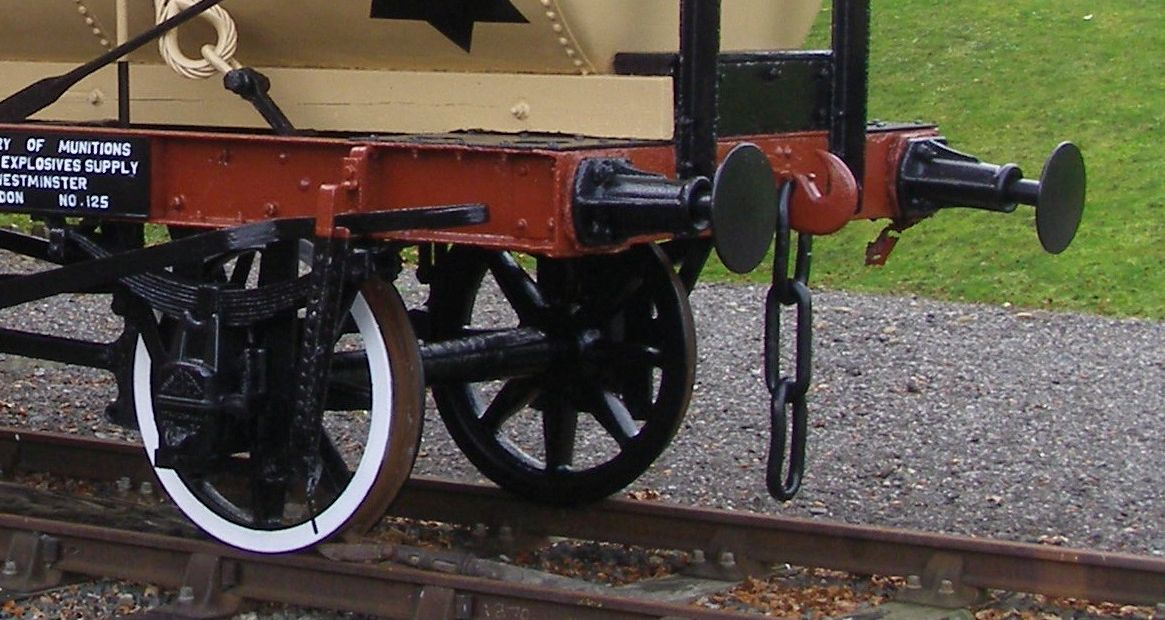
Three-link coupling on an antique tank wagon

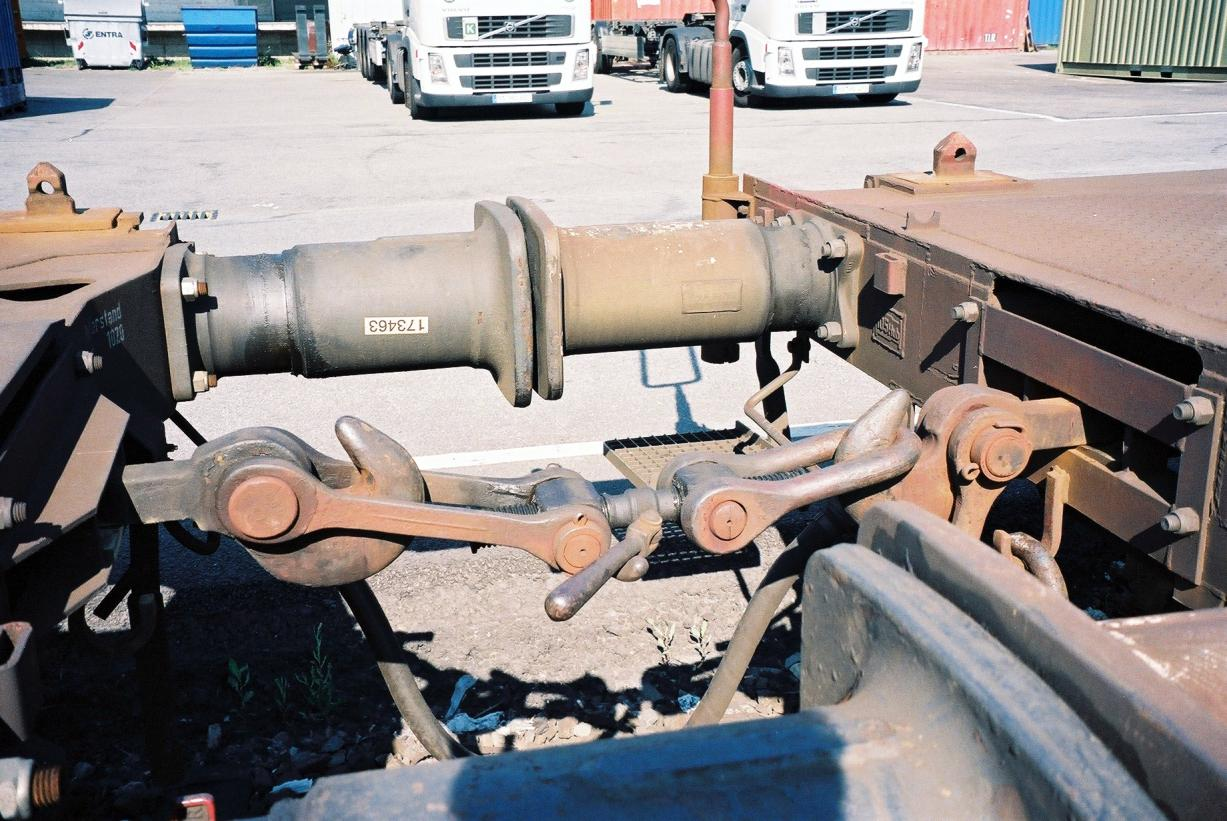
UIC standard screw coupling, shown attached and tightened

== Link and pin ==
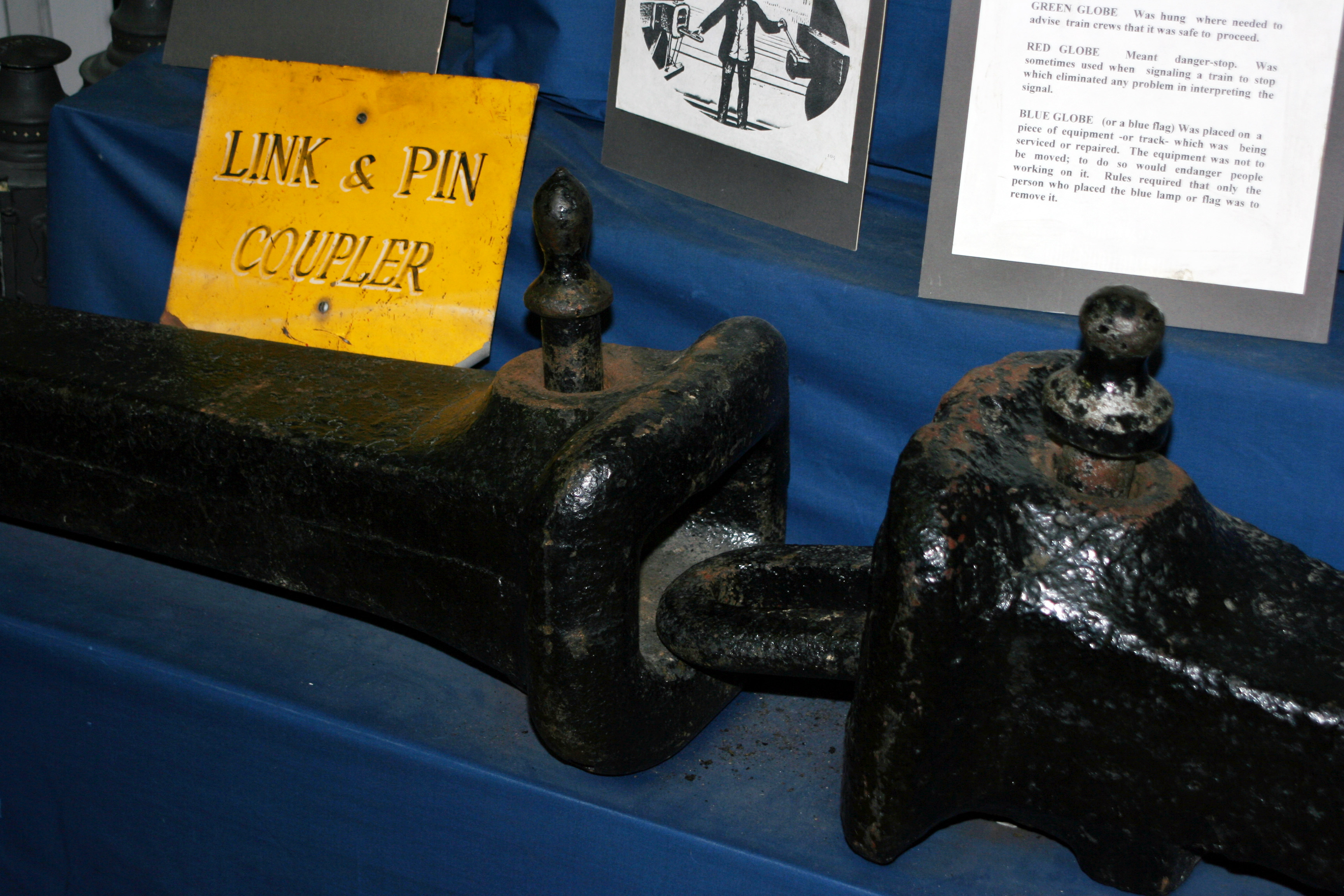
A link-and-pin coupler

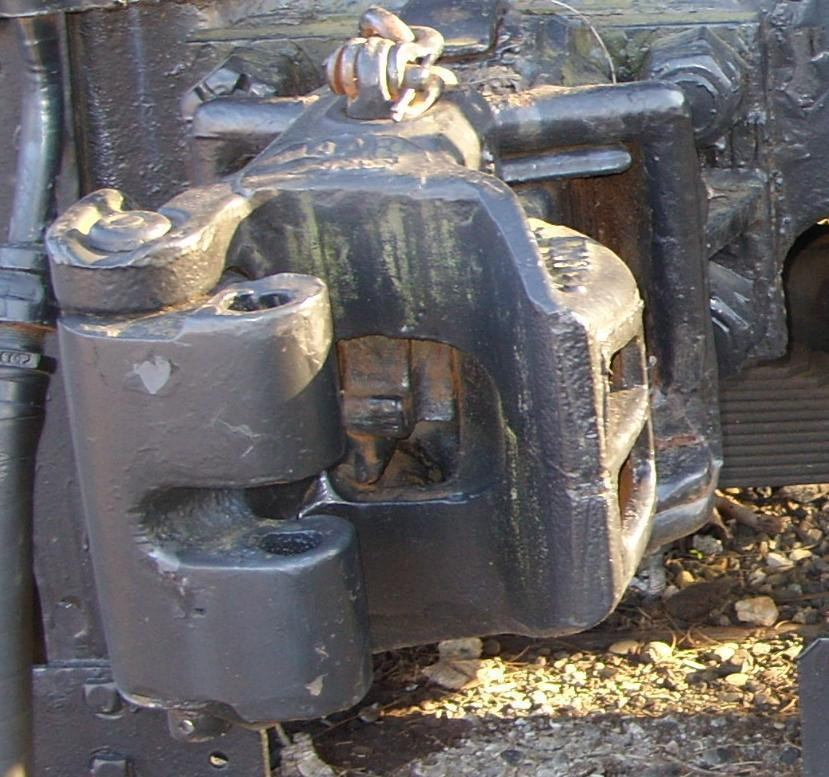
Transition era AAR knuckle coupler. The gap in the knuckle accommodates the link of a link and pin coupler and the vertical hole in the knuckle accommodates the pin.

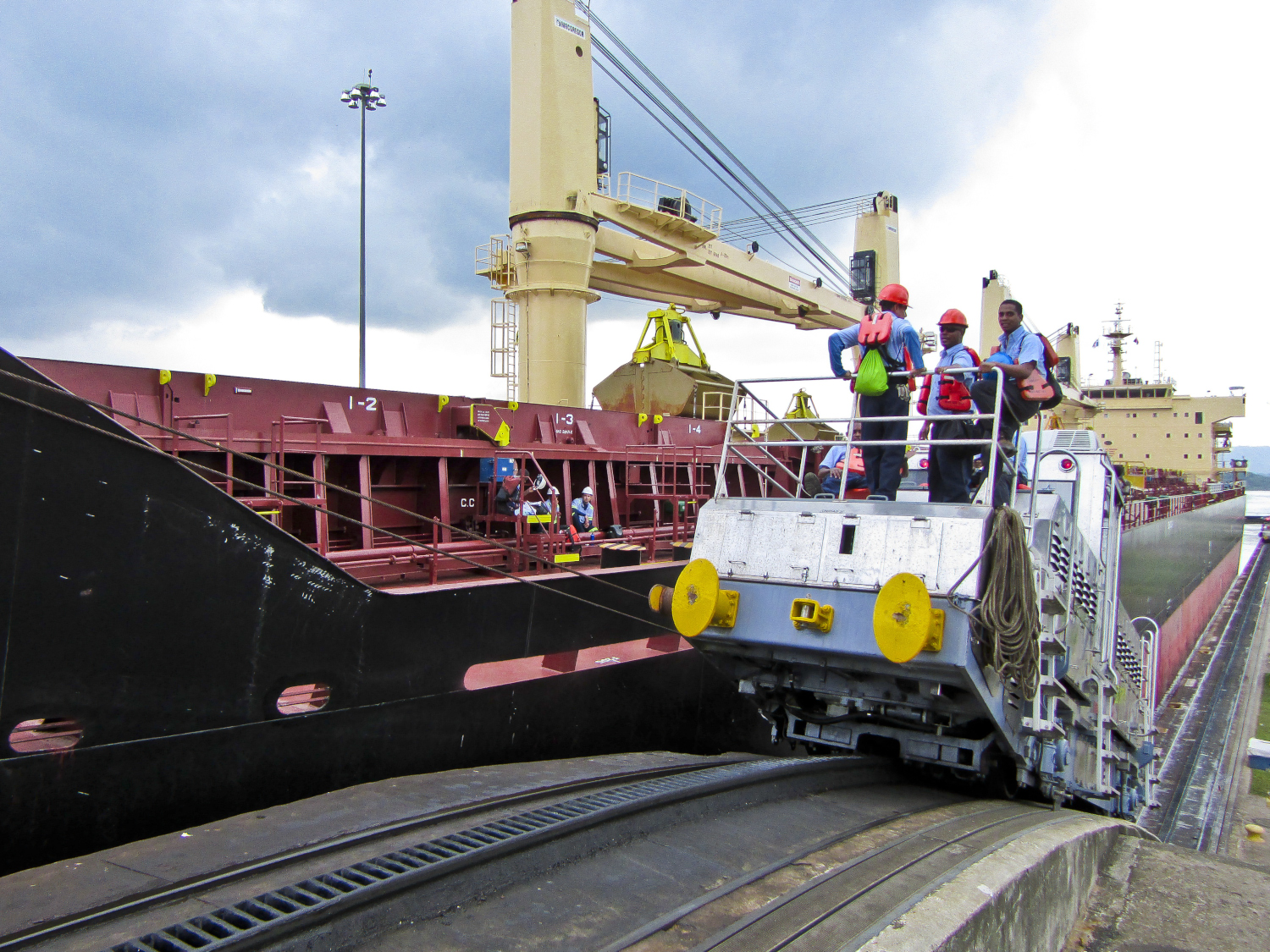
Link and pin coupler combined with side buffers on a Panama canal mule.

The link-and-pin coupling was the original style of coupling used on North American railways. After most railroads converted to semi-automatic Janney couplers, the link-and-pin survived on forest railways. While simple in principle, the system suffered from a lack of standardization in the size and height of the links and pockets.

The link-and-pin coupler consisted of a tube-like body that received an oblong link. During coupling, a rail worker had to stand between the cars as they came together and guide the link into the coupler pocket. Once the cars were joined, the employee inserted a pin into a hole a few inches from the tube's end to hold the link in place. This procedure was exceptionally dangerous, and many brakemen lost fingers or entire hands when they did not get them out of the way of the coupler pockets in time. Many more were killed as a result of being crushed between cars or dragged under cars that were coupled too quickly. Brakemen were issued with heavy clubs that could be used to hold the link in position, but many brakemen would not use the club and risked injury.

The link-and-pin coupler proved unsatisfactory because:

- It made a loose connection between the cars, with too much slack action.
- There was no standard design, and train crews often spent hours trying to match pins and links while coupling cars.
- Crew members had to go between moving cars during coupling, and were frequently injured and sometimes killed.
- The links and pins were often pilfered due to their value as scrap metal, resulting in substantial replacement costs.
- When a car happens to be turned 180 degrees, one would have to look for a link.
- Railroads progressively began to operate trains that were heavier than the link-and-pin system could cope with.

In Britain, link-and-pin couplers were common on narrow-gauge industrial and military railways. Eventually, they evolved into a form that could be reliably coupled when the train was stationary.

The Panama Canal mules, the locomotives used to guide ships through the locks of the Panama Canal, have link-and-pin couplers and side buffers. This design was chosen so that these normally solo-operating locomotives could be coupled to another locomotive in the event of a breakdown. On a straight track, the link-and-pin coupler is used. Since the vertical curve between the straight track sections and the ramp between the lock chambers has a very small radius, the height difference would be too great for a link and pin coupler, so the locomotives must be pushed through these sections uncoupled by using the side buffers. They have an extra-high buffer plate to prevent the buffers from locking in tight vertical curves.

== Balance lever coupling ==
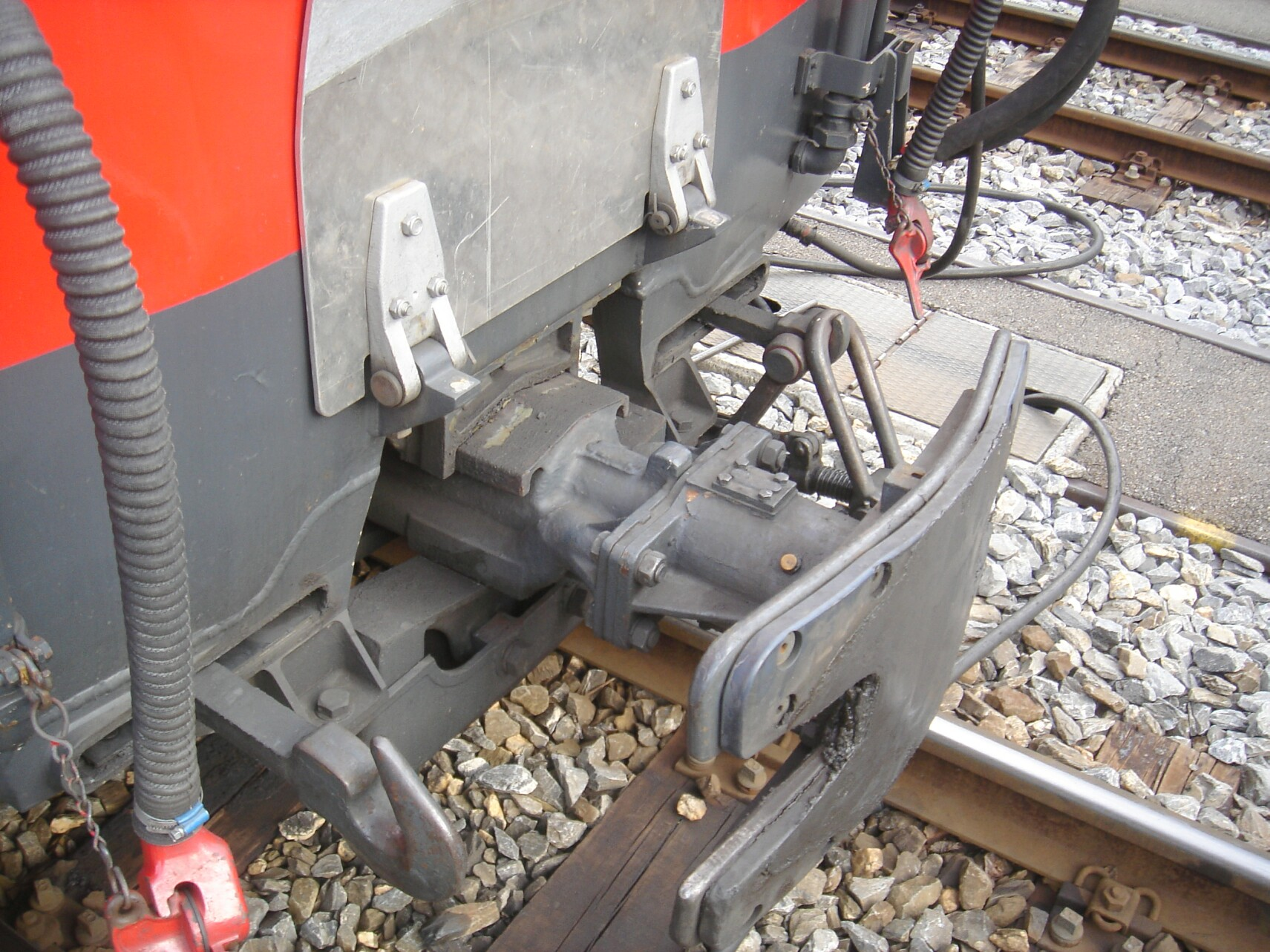
Balance lever coupling on narrow gauge coach in Switzerland

The balance lever coupling, also known as a central buffer coupling with two screw couplings, is a coupler commonly used on narrow gauge railroads with tight curves. By swapping the pulling and pushing devices, the standard screw coupling used on standard-gauge railroads became a center buffer coupling, with one screw coupling on each side of the buffer. The screw couplers are connected to a compensating lever that pivots on a vertical trunnion on the center buffer rod, allowing an even distribution of tractive forces between the two screw couplers.

== Albert coupler ==
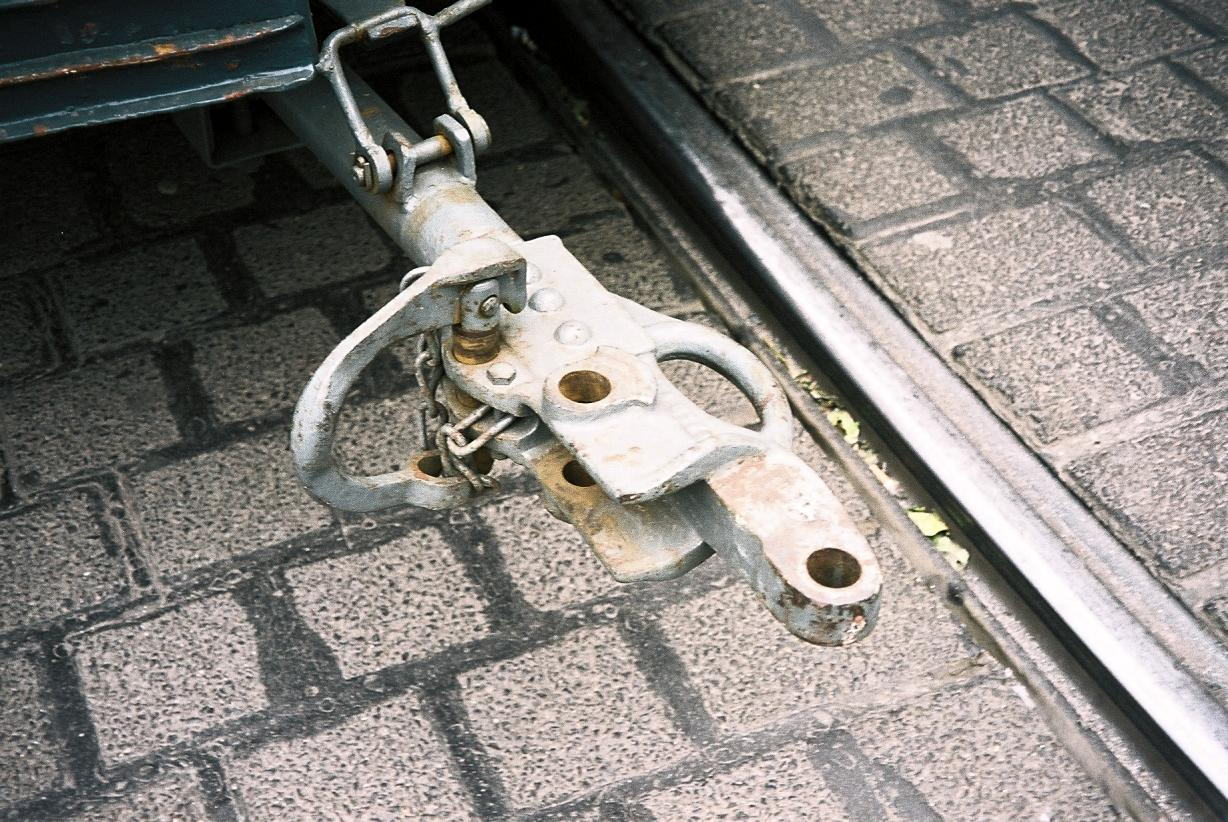
Albert coupler on a European tram

To avoid safety issues, Karl Albert, then the director of the Krefeld Tramway, developed the Albert coupler in 1921. The Albert coupler was designed as a key-and-slot coupler with two pins. Vehicles to be coupled were pushed together, both couplings moving to the same side. One pin was inserted, then the vehicles were pulled to straighten the coupling, and the other pin was inserted. This operation required less exact shunting. Due to the single-piece design, only minimal slack was possible. The system became quite popular with tram systems and narrow-gauge lines.

During the 1960s, most cities replaced them with automatic couplers. But even in modern vehicles, Albert couplers get installed as emergency couplers for towing a faulty vehicle.

== Miller hook and platform ==
The link and pin was replaced in North American passenger car usage during the latter part of the 19th century by the assemblage known as the Miller platform, which included a new coupler called the Miller hook. The Miller platform (and hook coupler) was used for several decades before being replaced by the Janney coupler.

== Norwegian ==
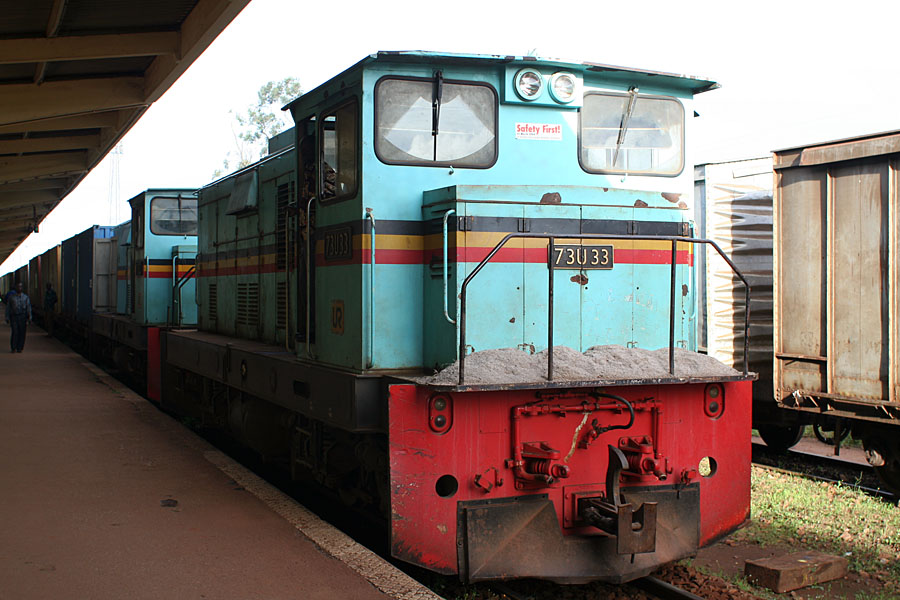
Norwegian coupling in Uganda

The Norwegian coupler consists of a central buffer with a movable hook that drops into a slot in the central buffer. There may also be a U-shaped safety catch on the opposite buffer that is flipped over the top of the hook to secure it. The safety device may also be a chain with a ball-shaped weight at the end that is thrown over the hook to hold it in place. On railways where the rolling stock always faces the same direction, the mechanical hook can be on one end of the wagon only. Not all Norwegian couplers are compatible with one another as they vary in height and width, and may or may not be limited to one hook at a time. The traction force limit is typically 350 kN. Sometimes the Norwegian coupler is supplemented with auxiliary chains.

The Norwegian coupler is also known as the Lloyd coupler, named after its British manufacturer, F.H. Lloyd & Co. Ltd, near Wednesbury, or as the meat chopper coupler, named after the shape of the movable hook. The Norwegian coupler allows sharper curves than the buffer-and-chain coupler, which is an advantage on narrow-gauge railways, where low speeds and reduced train loads allow a simpler system. The Norwegian coupler is found only on narrow gauge railways of 1,067 mm (3 ft 6 in), 1,000 mm (3 ft 3 3/8 in) or less in Great Britain and its former colonies. For example, it is used on the Isle of Man Railway, the Western Australian Government Railways, in Tanzania, on the Ffestiniog Railway, on the Lynton and Barnstaple Railway, and on the Welsh Highland Railway,

== Radial couplers ==
Two versions of the radial coupler were used in South Africa. One, the Johnston coupler, commonly known as a bell link-and-pin coupler, was introduced in 1873 and is similar in operation to, and compatible with, link-and-pin couplers, but is bell-shaped with a circular coupler face. The other, the bell-and-hook coupler, was introduced in 1902 and is similar to the Norwegian coupler, but also has a circular coupler face and a coupler pocket that is open at the top of the coupler face to accommodate the drawhook.

=== Johnston coupler ===
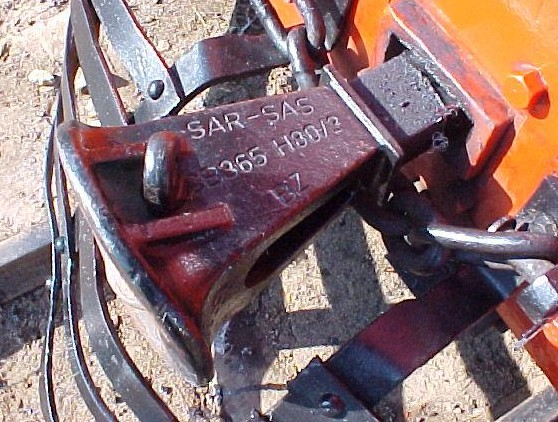
Johnston link-and-pin coupler

The Johnston coupler, commonly known as a bell link-and-pin coupler from its bell shape, was first introduced in the Cape of Good Hope in 1873, following the establishment of the Cape Government Railways (CGR) in 1872 and the decision by the Cape government to expand the railways into the interior and to convert the existing tracks from 4 ft 8 1/2 in (1,435 mm) standard gauge to 3 ft 6 in (1,067 mm) Cape gauge. All new Cape gauge locomotives and rolling stock acquired from 1873 were equipped with these or similar couplers, beginning with the CGR 0-4-0ST of 1873, a construction locomotive named Little Bess.

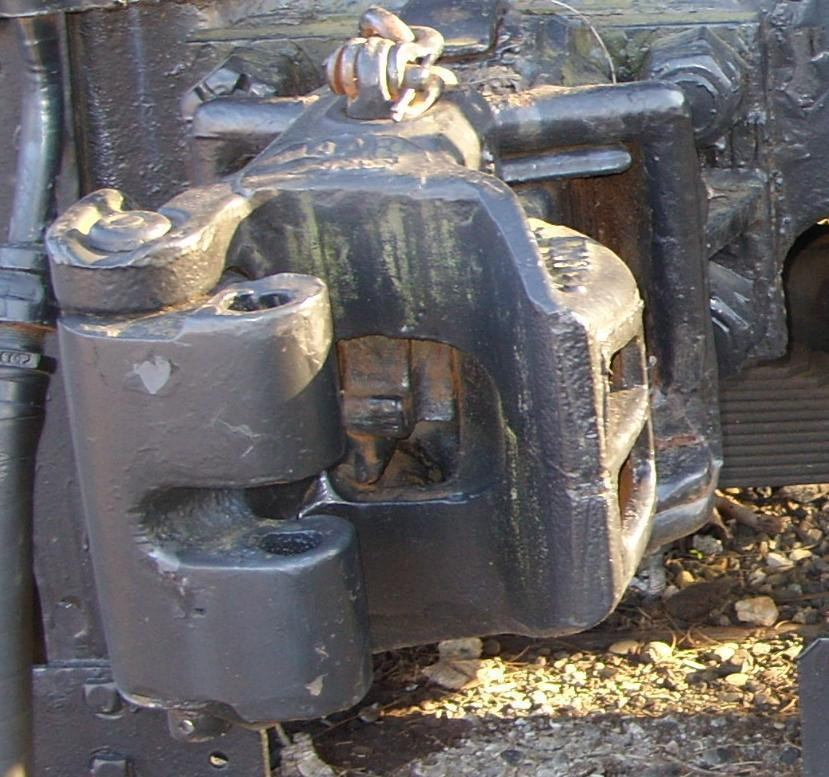
Transition era AAR knuckle coupler. The gap in the knuckle accommodates the link of a Johnston coupler and the vertical hole in the knuckle accommodates the pin.

The Natal Government Railways (NGR), established in the Colony of Natal in 1875, followed suit, and all locomotives and rolling stock acquired by that railway were equipped with Johnston couplers, beginning with the NGR Class K 2-6-0T in 1877.

Likewise, in 1889, when the first locomotives were obtained by the newly established Netherlands-South African Railway Company in the Zuid-Afrikaansche Republiek, they were fitted with Johnston couplers.

Unlike the 2 ft (610 mm) narrow gauge railways of the CGR, those of the NGR also made use of Johnston couplers. The first of these narrow gauge lines came into operation in 1906, when the first NGR Class N 4-6-2T locomotives entered service on the Weenen branch out of Estcourt.

Coupling and uncoupling were done manually, which posed a high risk of serious injury or death to crew members, who had to go between moving vehicles to guide the link into the coupler pocket during coupling. Johnston couplers gradually began to be replaced on the South African Railways from 1927, but not on narrow gauge rolling stock. All new Cape gauge locomotives and rolling stock acquired from that year were equipped with AAR knuckle couplers. The conversion of all older rolling stock would take several years, and both coupler types could still be seen on some vehicles into the late 1950s. During the transition period, knuckle couplers on many locomotives had a horizontal gap and a vertical hole in the knuckle itself to accommodate, respectively, a link and a pin, to enable it to couple to vehicles which were still equipped with the older Johnston couplers.

=== Bell-and-hook coupler ===
The bell-and-hook coupling system was first introduced in the Cape of Good Hope in 1902, when two CGR Type A 2-6-4T locomotives were acquired as construction engines on the new 2 ft (610 mm) narrow gauge Avontuur Railway which was being constructed out of Port Elizabeth through the Langkloof. In South Africa, these couplers were used on only the narrow gauge lines in the Cape of Good Hope.

The coupler is similar to the Norwegian coupler. It is a radial coupler with a coupler pocket that is open at the top of the coupling face. Instead of a link and pins, it makes use of a drawhook, which, upon coupling, slides over the drawhook pin in the coupler of the next vehicle in the train. To prevent the drawhook of the mating coupler from accidental uncoupling, the coupler bell is equipped with a drawhook guard, commonly known as a bridle, above the coupler pocket.

Usual practice was to have a drawhook fitted to only one of the mating couplers, and train crews therefore carried spare drawhooks and drawhook pins on the locomotive. While automatic coupling is possible, this rarely happens, and manual assistance is required during coupling. Uncoupling is done manually by lifting the drawhook by hand to release it. The coupler could be adapted to be compatible with the Johnston coupler by replacing the drawhook with a U-shaped adapter link, which was attached using the same drawhook pin.

Bell-and-hook couplers began to be replaced on the Avontuur Railway upon the introduction of Class 91-000 diesel-electric locomotives on the narrow gauge system in 1973. All new narrow gauge rolling stock acquired for that line from that year was equipped with Willison couplers. Older rolling stock was not converted, and an adapter was used to couple the two types of rolling stock. The drawhook on the bell-and-hook coupler would be replaced with the adapter, which was attached using the same drawhook pin.

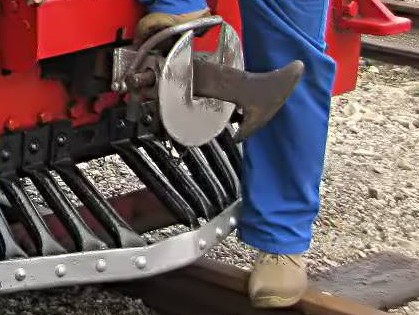
Bell-and-hook coupler

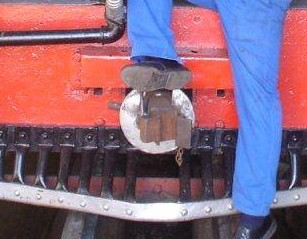
Bell-and-hook coupler with Willison adapter

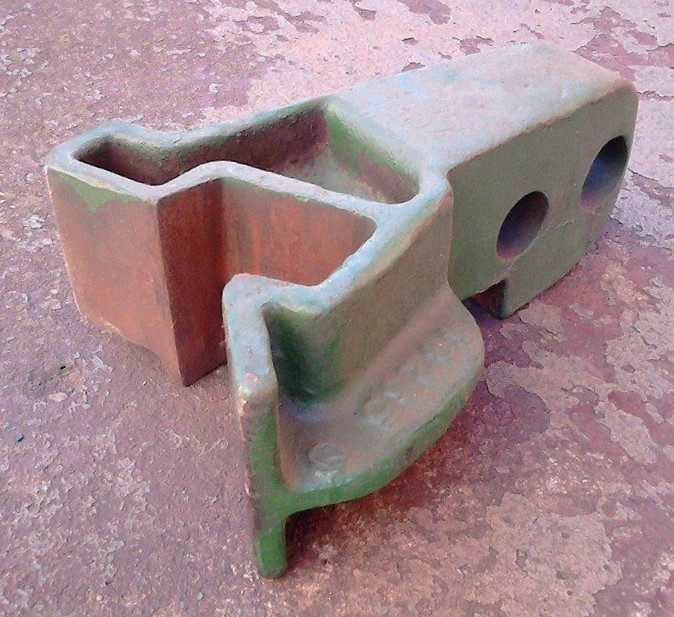
Willison coupler adapter for bell-and-hook couplers

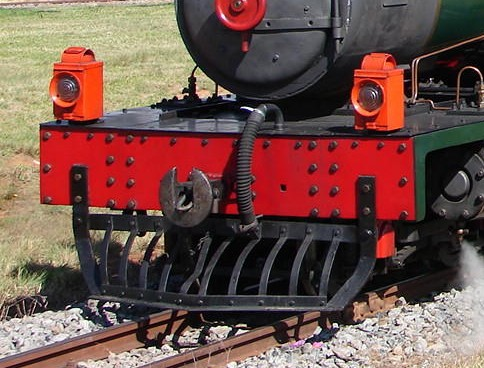
Bell-and-hook coupler with Johnston coupler adapter link instead of a hook

== Automatic couplers ==
There are several automatic train couplings, most of which are incompatible with one another. The level of automation varies and can be divided into categories:

- mechanical coupling of vehicles only, requires manual connection of pneumatic and electrical lines;
- mechanical coupling of vehicles with automatic connection of pneumatic lines requires manual connection of electrical lines;
- mechanical coupling of vehicles with automatic connection of pneumatic and electrical lines (but not data transmission lines);
- mechanical coupling of vehicles with automatic connection of pneumatic and electrical lines (including data transmission lines);
- mechanical coupling of vehicles with automatic connection of pneumatic and electrical lines (including data transmission lines) and automatic uncoupling capability.

=== Buckeye/Janney/MCB/ARA/AAR/APTA couplers ===
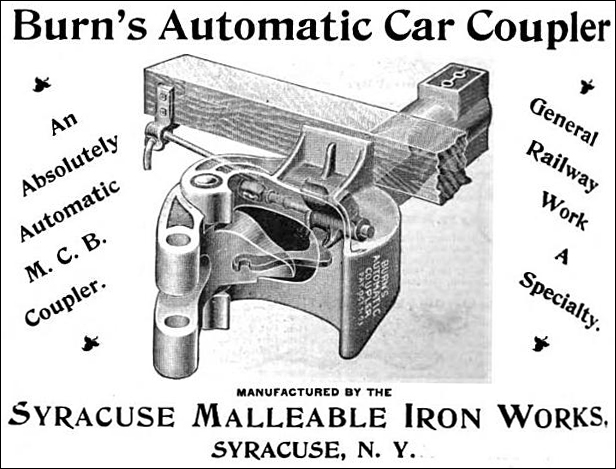
Syracuse Malleable Iron Works – 1894. The gap in the knuckle accommodates the link of a link and pin coupler, and the vertical hole in the knuckle accommodates the pin. This design was used in the transition period.

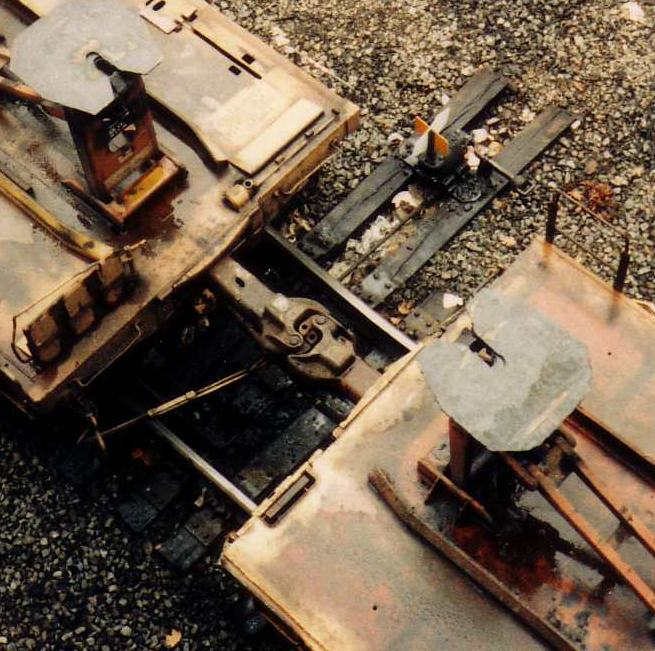
Knuckle (AAR Type "E") couplers in use

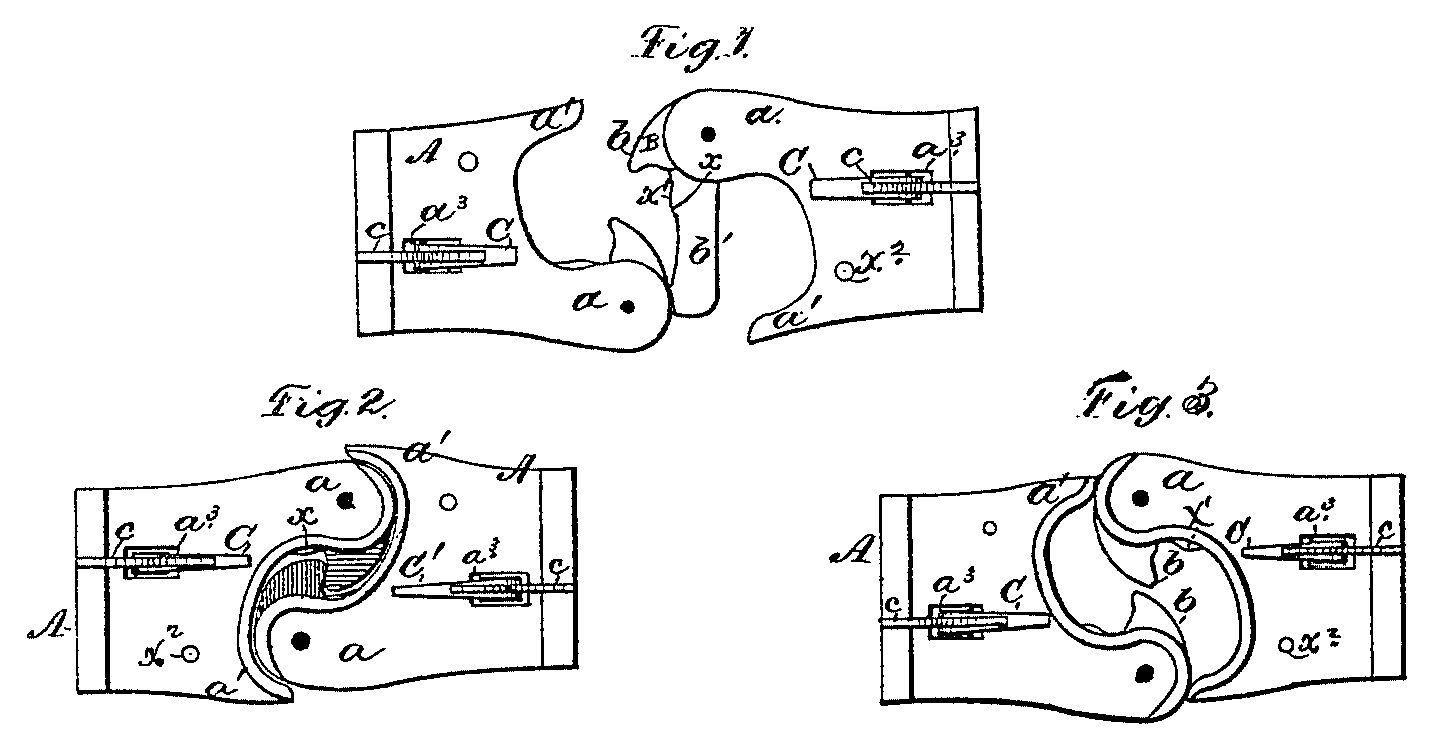
Diagram of the top view of Janney's coupler design as published in his patent application in 1873

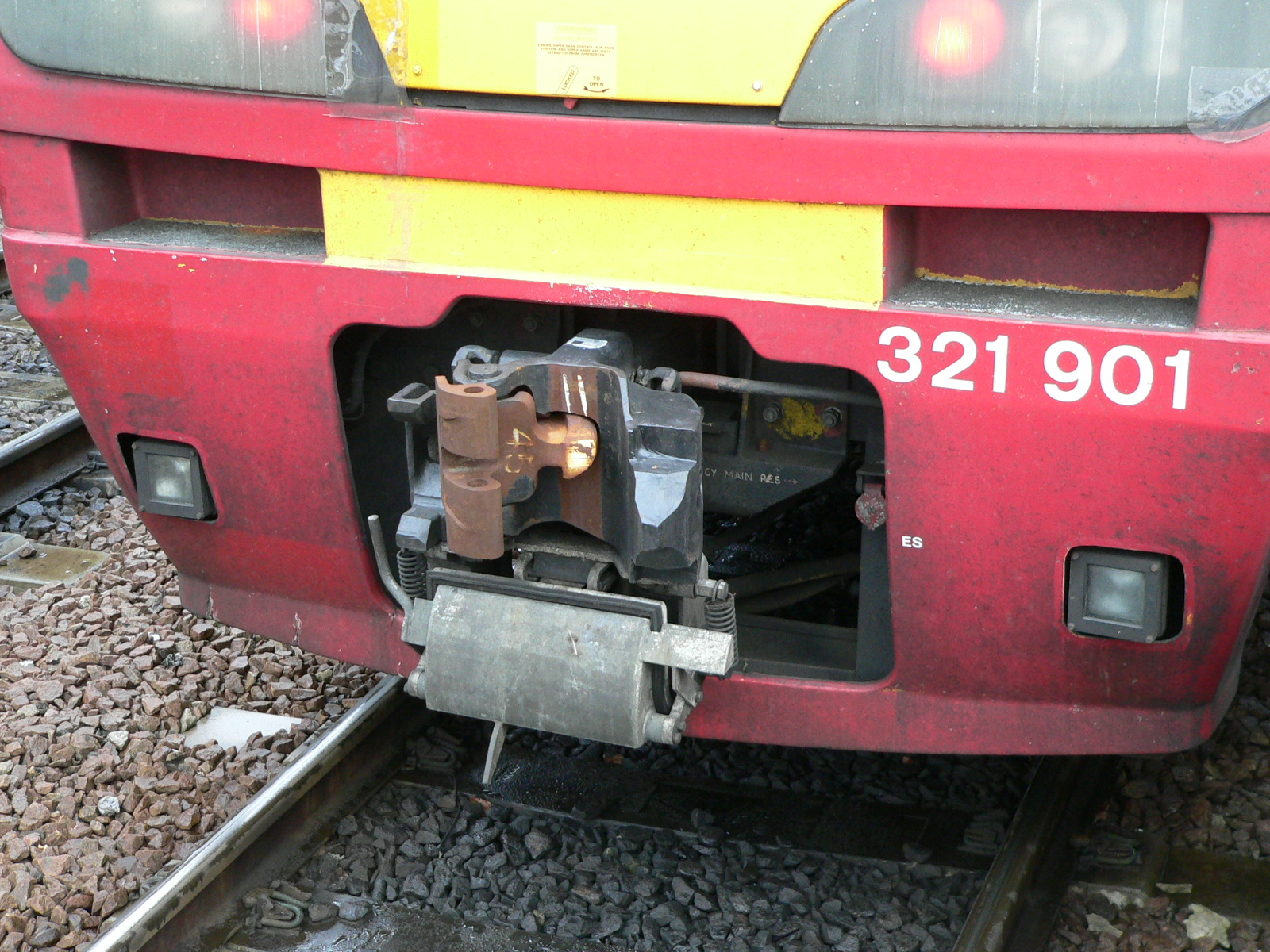
APT Type H Tightlock coupler on British Rail Class 321. Lower electric connector is not typical in North America.

The Janney coupler, later the Master Car Builders Association (MCB) coupler, now the Association of American Railroads (AAR) coupler, is also commonly known as a buckeye, knuckle, or Alliance coupler. The AAR/APTA TypeE, TypeF, and TypeH couplers are all compatible Janney couplers, but are used on different rail cars (general freight, tank cars, rotary hoppers, passenger cars, etc.).

The knuckle coupler or Janney coupler was invented by Eli H. Janney, who received a patent in 1873 (U.S. patent 138,405). It is also known as a buckeye coupler, notably in the United Kingdom, where some rolling stock (mostly for passenger trains) is fitted with it. Janney was a dry goods clerk and former Confederate Army officer from Alexandria, Virginia, who used his lunch hours to whittle a wooden alternative to the link-and-pin coupler. The term buckeye comes from the nickname of the US state of Ohio, the "Buckeye State", and the Ohio Brass Company, which originally marketed the coupling.

In 1893, satisfied that an automatic coupler could meet the demands of commercial railroad operations and, at the same time, be manipulated safely, the United States Congress passed the Safety Appliance Act. Its success in promoting switchyard safety was stunning. Between 1877 and 1887, approximately 38% of all railworker accidents involved coupling. That percentage fell as railroads began replacing link-and-pin couplers with automatic couplers. By 1902, only two years after the SAA's effective date, coupling accidents accounted for just 4% of all employee accidents. Coupler-related accidents dropped from nearly 11,000 in 1892 to just over 2,000 in 1902, even though the number of railroad employees steadily increased during that decade.

When the Janney coupler was chosen to be the North American standard, there were 8,000 patented alternatives to choose from. Many AAR coupler designs exist to accommodate the requirements of various car designs, but all must share certain dimensions that allow one design to couple to any other.

The Janney coupler is used in the United States, Canada, Mexico, Japan, India, Taiwan, Australia, New Zealand, South Africa, Saudi Arabia, Cuba, Chile, Brazil, Portugal, China and many countries in Africa both standard gauge and narrow gauges.

The Janney coupler generally provides only mechanical coupling; only Type H adds automatic connections of pneumatic and electrical lines.

==== Henricot coupler ====
The Henricot coupler is a variation on the Janney coupler, introduced by Belgian engineer and entrepreneur Émile Henricot of Court-Saint-Étienne. It is used on certain EMUs of the National Railway Company of Belgium, including the Class 75).

Henricot couplers

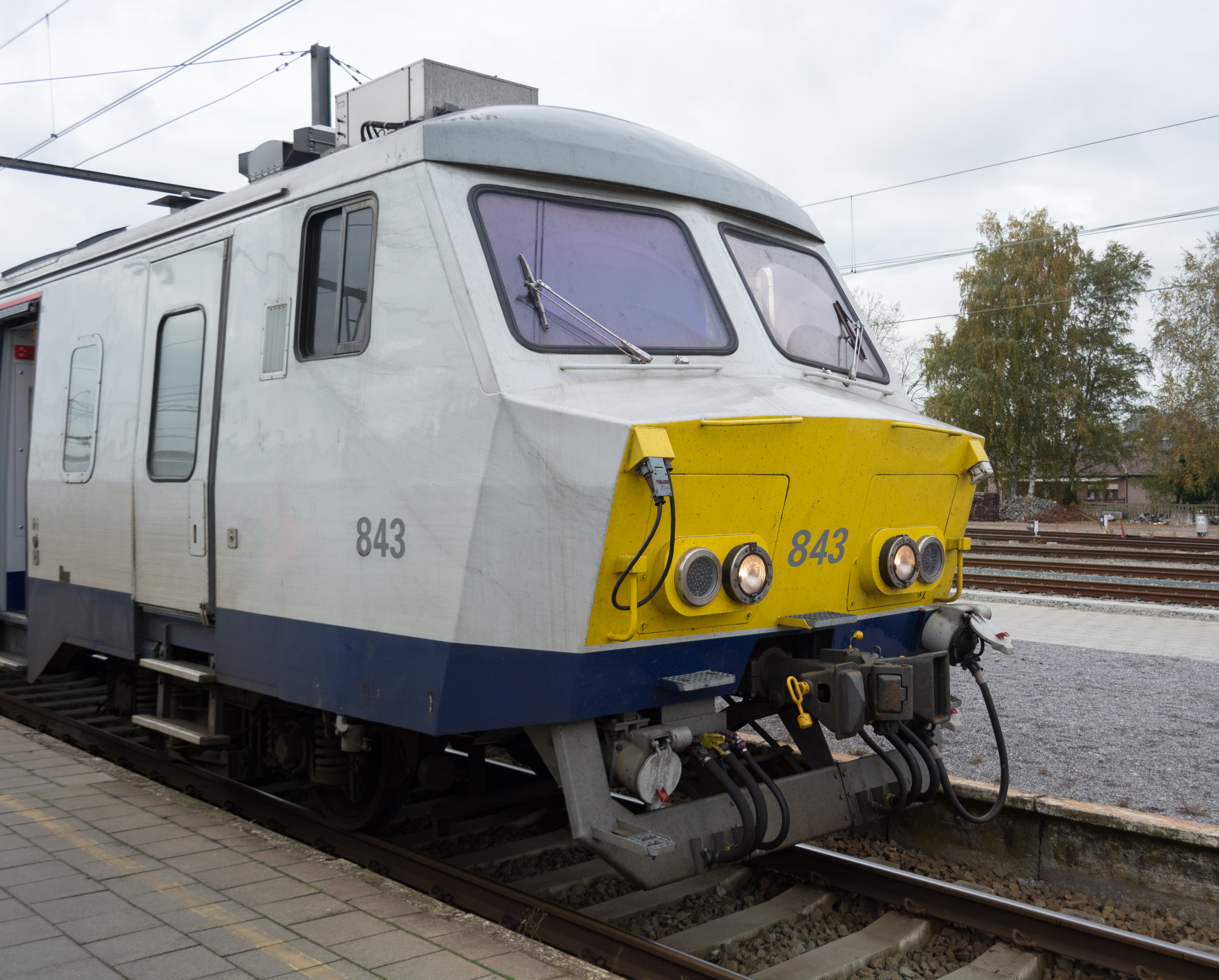
Henricot coupler on an SNCB Class 75 EMU with separate air brake and head-end power connections

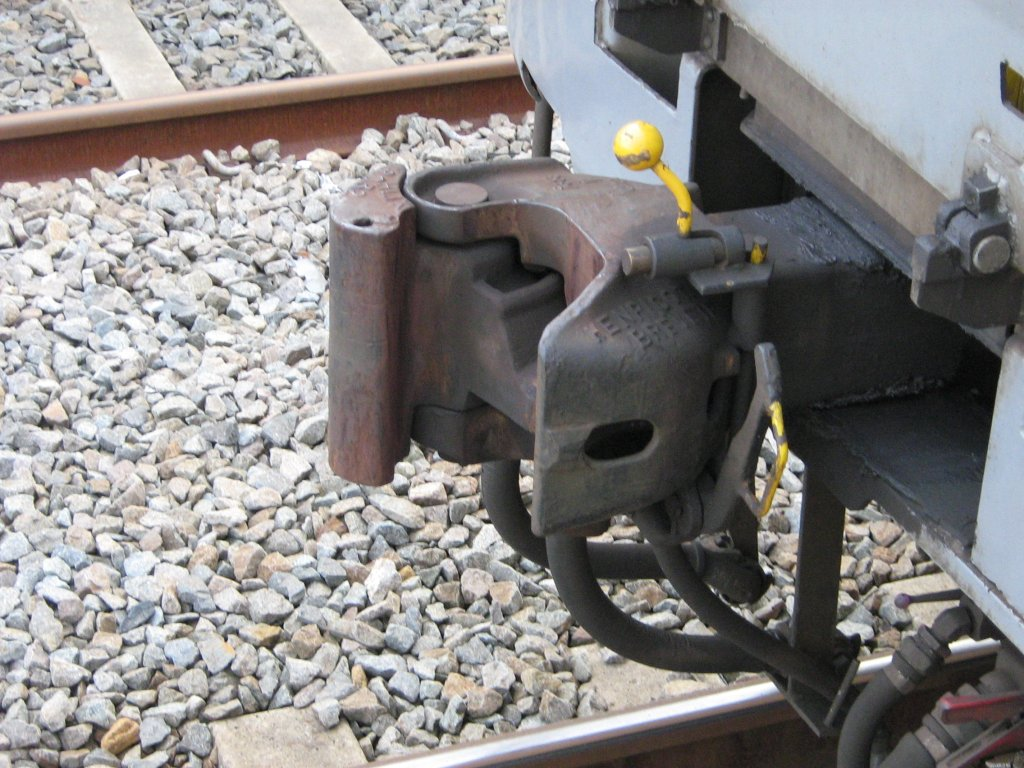
Henricot coupler on a Belgian EMU

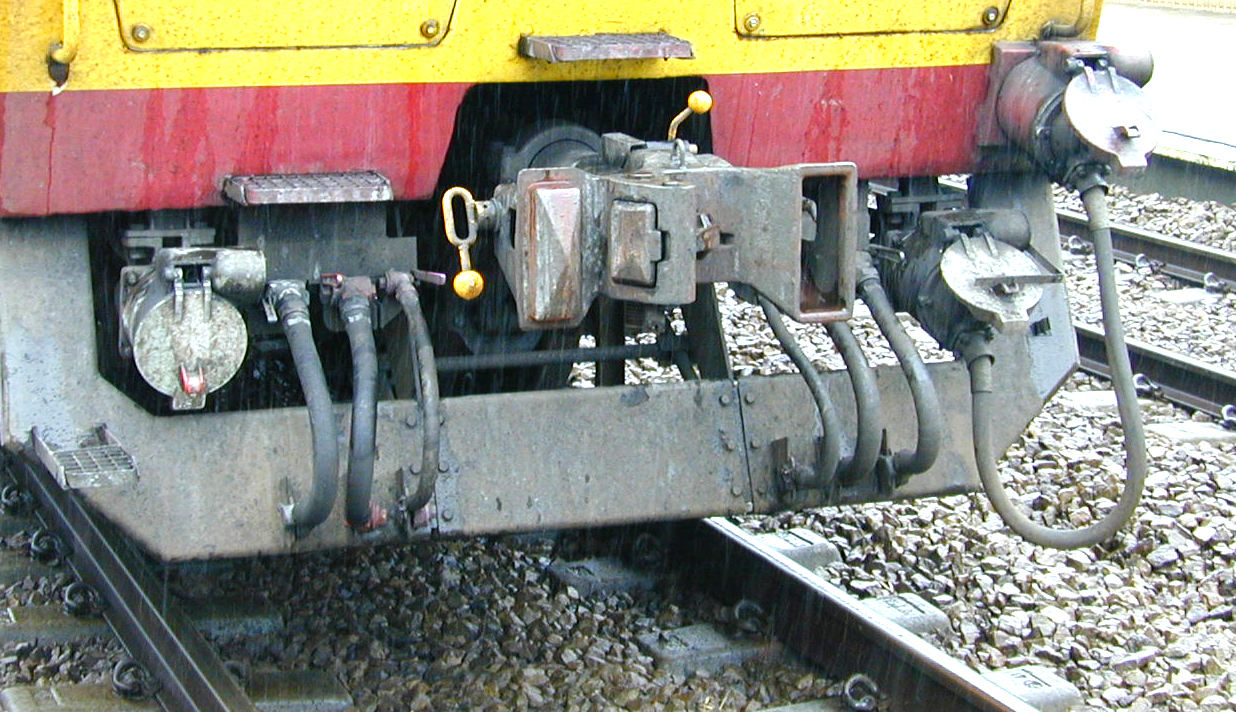
Closeup of Henricot coupler

=== Willison/SA3 coupler ===
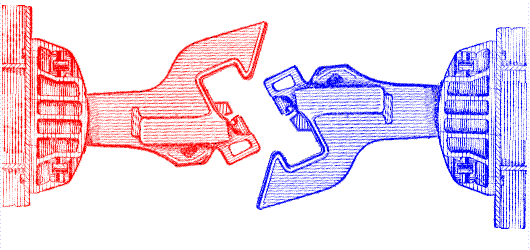
The simplified scheme of the SA-3 automatic couplers. An animation of the SA-3 coupler

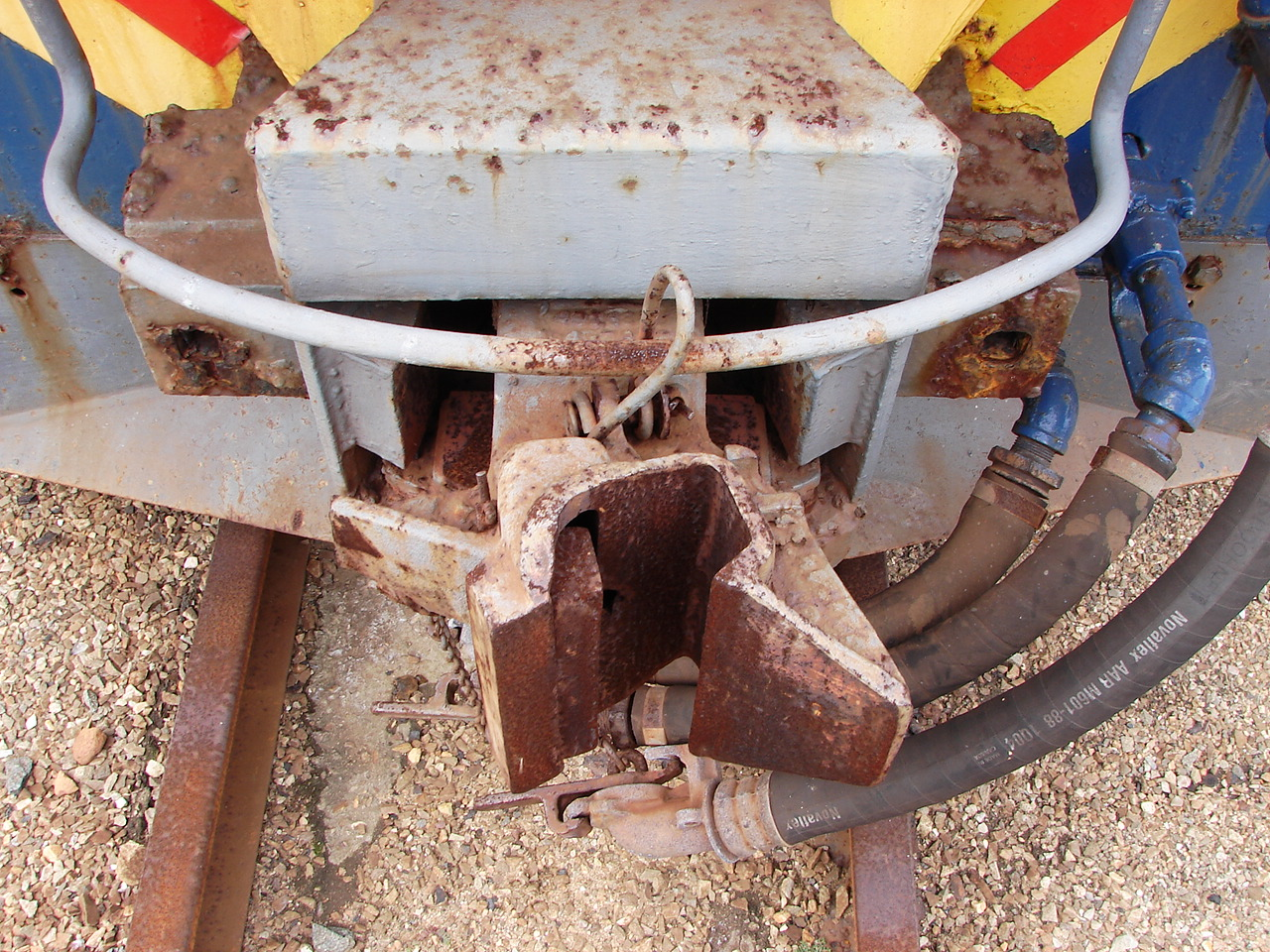
Willison coupler on South African 2 ft (610 mm) narrow gauge

The Willison coupler was developed in the US in 1916 to address issues present in the Janney coupling.

The Russian SA3 coupler operates on the same principles as the AAR coupler, but the two types are incompatible. It was introduced in the Soviet Union in 1932 based on a British patent and has since been used on the whole 1,520 mm (4 ft 11 27/32 in) network, including Mongolia. Finnish locomotives have Unilink couplers that can couple to UIC couplers used on Finnish stock and to SA3 couplers used on Russian stock.

It is also used on the 1,435 mm (4 ft 8 1/2 in) standard gauge networks of Iran and on Malmbanan in Sweden for ore trains. Some 2 ft (610 mm) gauge cane tramway vehicles in Queensland have been fitted with miniature Willison couplers. It was introduced on the 2 ft (610 mm) narrow-gauge Avontuur Railway of the South African Railways in 1973.

- Russian trains are rarely longer than about 750 m (2,461 ft) and rarely exceed a maximum tonnage of about 6,000 t (5,900 long tons; 6,600 short tons). The heaviest trains using these couplers are on Malmbanan where they are up to 9,000 t (8,900 long tons; 9,900 short tons).
- Maximum force the SA3 coupler can carry, both tensile and compressive, is about 2.5 MN (280 STf; 250 LTf).
- The maximum allowed tractive effort for the SA-3 is 135 tf (1,320 kN; 133 LTf; 149 STf) (1.32 MN or 300,000 lbf) by Russian white papers.
- The proposed European automatic coupler is compatible with the Russian coupler, but with automatic air, control, and power connections. Implementation has been permanently delayed, except for a few users. See § Unicoupler/Intermat.
- The SA3 resembles a left-handed fist.

The SA3 coupler is one of the strongest couplers in the world – maximum tonnage of a train that uses this type of coupler is about 8000 t – but provides only mechanical coupling. Adding automatic electrical and pneumatic connectivity is a complex challenge.

There are many variations and brand names for these couplers.

As of 2020 Construcciones y Auxiliar de Ferrocarriles is working on an automatic coupler based on SA3, a possible replacement of the buffers and chain coupling on European railways.

==== Unicoupler/Intermat ====
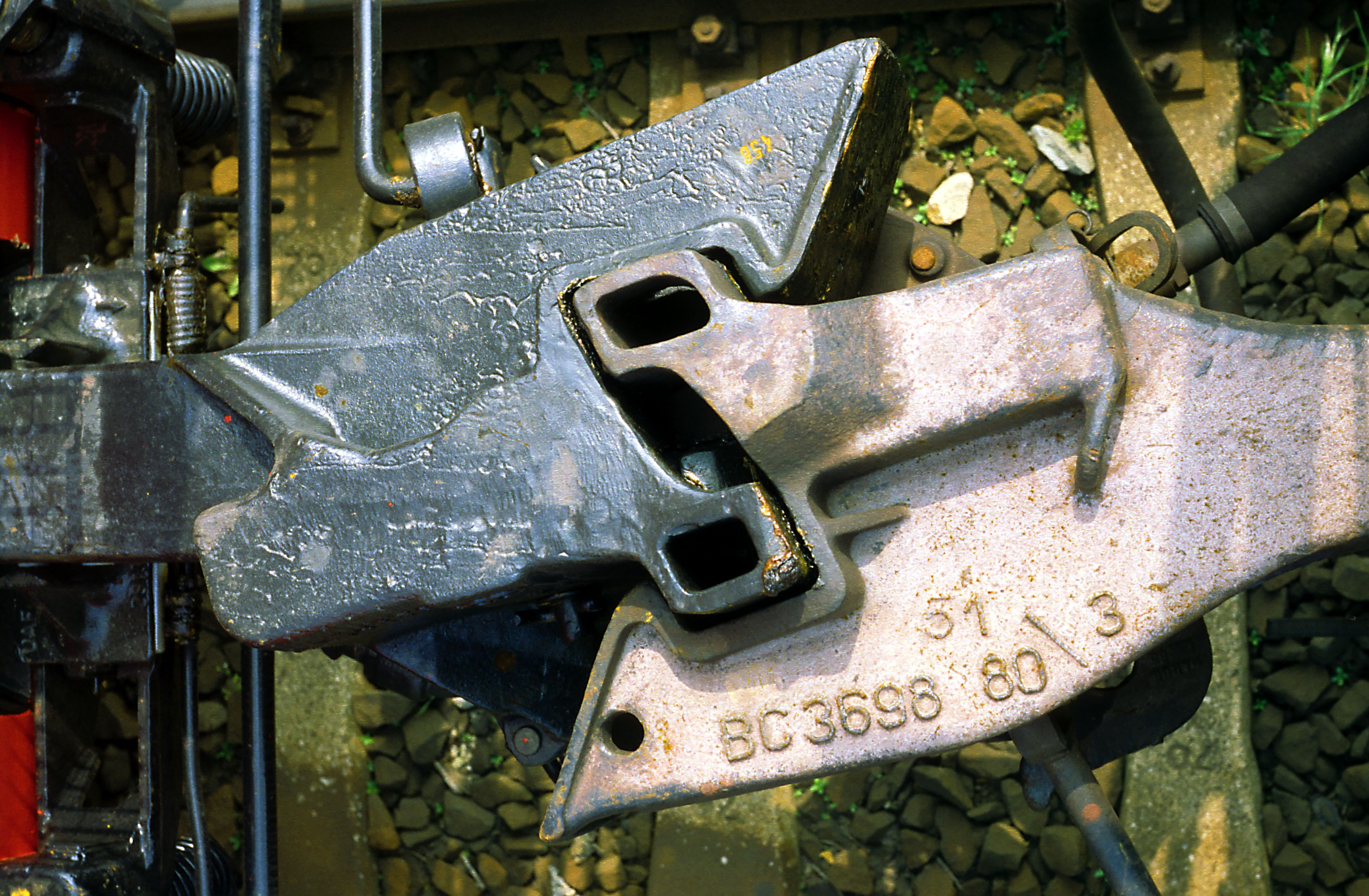
Intermat and Unicoupler heads from above

Also known as AK69e. Unicoupler was developed by Knorr from West Germany in the 1970s, in parallel with a compatible counterpart, the Intermat coupler, by VEB Waggonbau Bautzen from East Germany. The Unicoupler/Intermat coupler can automatically couple two pneumatic lines and up to six electrical connections.

This coupler is mechanically compatible with SA-3 and Willison couplers (but pneumatic and electrical connections must be done manually).

Maximum tonnage of a train that uses this type of coupler is about 6000 t. AK69e and Intermat adoption failure has been attributed to economic performance.

As of 2020, it has found limited use: it has been adopted by the Iranian Railways and is also used in Germany on trains transporting iron ore between Hamburg and Salzgitter.

==== C-AKv ====
The C-AKv coupler (also called Transpact) is a newer compact Willison coupler developed by Faiveley Transport. It is mechanically compatible with the SA3 coupler (but pneumatic and electrical connections must be done manually), fully compatible with the Unicoupler and, if additional buffers are mounted, it can be coupled with the conventional European screw coupling as well. The C-AKv coupler can automatically couple two pneumatic lines. As of 2020 its use is limited to trains transporting ore between Rotterdam and Dillingen steelworks and lignite between Wählitz and Buna in Germany.

==== Z-AK ====
The Z-AK coupler is yet another Willison coupler developed by Knorr Bremse. It was designed in response to the obvious failure of the Unicoupler/Intermat. It is compatible with the buffers and screw coupling. It is one of the few automatic couplers that cannot carry tensile forces; railway vehicles using this type of coupler must be equipped with buffers as well.

==== Unilink coupler ====
The Unilink coupler is a coupler which is used in CSI border countries such as Finland or Ukraine. The coupler is compatible with both SA3 and screw coupling. It is an SA3 coupler with an additional horn for attaching the shackle of the screw coupler and with a screw coupler that is connected to the hook of wagons equipped with screw couplers. When the screw coupler is not in use, the coupler shackle rests in a holder on the coupler's left side. Rolling stock equipped with Unilink couplers is also equipped with side buffers, which are required when using the screw coupler.

Finland uses passenger coaches equipped with screw couplers because they have the advantage over the SA3 coupler of providing a slack-free ride, as the screw couplers are always under tension, and the side buffers do not separate in normal operation. Most Finnish freight cars are also equipped with screw couplers. Only some heavy freight cars and Russian equipment are fitted with SA3 couplers.

=== Automatic buffing contact coupler (ABC coupler) ===
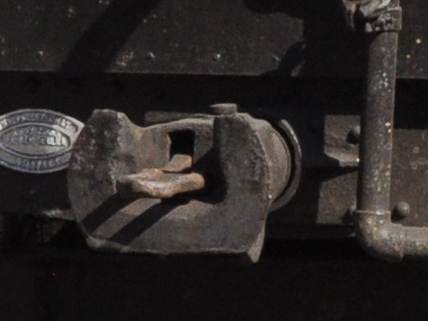
ABC coupler on a Kalka–Shimla train

The automatic buffing contact coupler, better known as the ABC coupler, was invented by J.T. Jepson, patented in Great Britain in 1906 and manufactured by the A.B.C. Coupler and Engineering Company Limited in a factory in Wolverhampton.

The coupling consists of a shackle that protrudes from a central buffer and drops into a hook in the opposite buffer upon making contact. The non-engaged shackle of the opposite coupler rests on the engaged shackle, securing it against disengagement by its weight. To uncouple the ABC coupling, the upper shackle that is not engaged is lifted. This causes the tail lever attached to the shackle to lift the engaged shackle clear of the hook and release the coupling.

In 1912, an improved version of the coupling with a better locking mechanism was introduced, in which a spring-loaded locking bar blocked a disk serving as the hook. This disc hook was rotated into the locked position by the approaching shackle of the opposite coupling. To release the coupling, it was sufficient to pull a chain or handle to release the locking bar, thereby allowing the disk hook to rotate.

The coupler was mainly used on narrow gauge railways of the British colonies, e.g., the Bauchi Light Railway in Nigeria, Ceylon, Honduras or the Kalka-Shimla Railway in India. The Royal State Railway of Siam (RSR, later State Railway of Thailand (SRT)) used the ABC coupler on its rolling stock before replacement with the Janney coupler from late 1950.

=== Stearns and Ward coupler ===
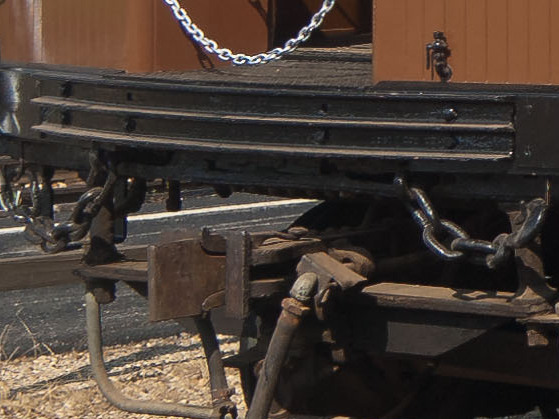
Stearns and Wards coupler on a car of the Northwestern Elevated Railroad

The Stearns and Ward coupler, known as the Ward coupler in the United Kingdom, is named after its two American inventors, Robert B. Stearns and Frank D. Ward, who were jointly granted the patent US 737673 "Car-coupling." in 1903. The coupler was specifically designed for use on elevated railways as they were introduced in Chicago at the turn of the century. It was first used on the electric trains of the Northwestern Elevated Railroad in 1902. Three years later, in 1905, it was introduced by Wards in the electrification of the Circle Line of the District Railway, which became the London Underground. The Ward coupler was the standard coupler on London Underground trains until 1936, when it was replaced by the Wedglock coupler. This multi-function coupler also provided pneumatic and electrical connections.

The cars must be pushed together to couple. The tongue of each coupler head enters the throat of the opposite coupler head, where the hook on the tongue turns a vertically mounted, spring-loaded coupling pin against the force of the spring. Once the hook passes the coupling pin, the spring force returns the coupling pin to its original position, holding the hook head in the coupling. When coupled, the coupler heads are free to move vertically, which should prevent a derailed car from dragging other cars with it in the event of a derailment on the elevated railway. Uncoupling is done by turning the coupling pin against the spring force with an actuating arm operated by a shunting pole or by a fixed rod with handles that can be reached from a position next to the train, away from the third rail.

== Multi-function couplers ==
Multi-function couplers (MFCs), or fully automatic couplers, make all connections between rail vehicles (mechanical, air brake, and electrical) without human intervention, in contrast to autocouplers, or semi-automatic couplers, which handle only the mechanical aspects. The majority of trains fitted with these types of couplers are multiple units, especially those used in mass transit operations.

There are a few designs of fully automatic couplers in use worldwide, including the Scharfenberg coupler, various knuckle hybrids such as the Tightlock (used in the UK), the Wedglock coupling, BSI coupling (Bergische Stahl Industrie, now Faiveley Transport), and the Schaku-Tomlinson Tightlock coupling.

There are several other automatic train couplings similar to the Scharfenberg coupler, but not necessarily compatible with it. Older US transit operators continue to use these non-Janney electro-pneumatic coupler designs, having used them for decades.

=== Westinghouse H2C ===
The Westinghouse H2C coupler, whose predecessor the H2A was first used on the BMT Standards and later the R1 through R9 classes, is currently used on the R32, R42, R62, R62A, R68, and R68A class subway cars of the New York City Subway. The A ends of the cars typically have the Westinghouse coupler, and the B ends use either a semi-permanent drawbar or a Westinghouse coupler.

=== WABCO N-Type ===
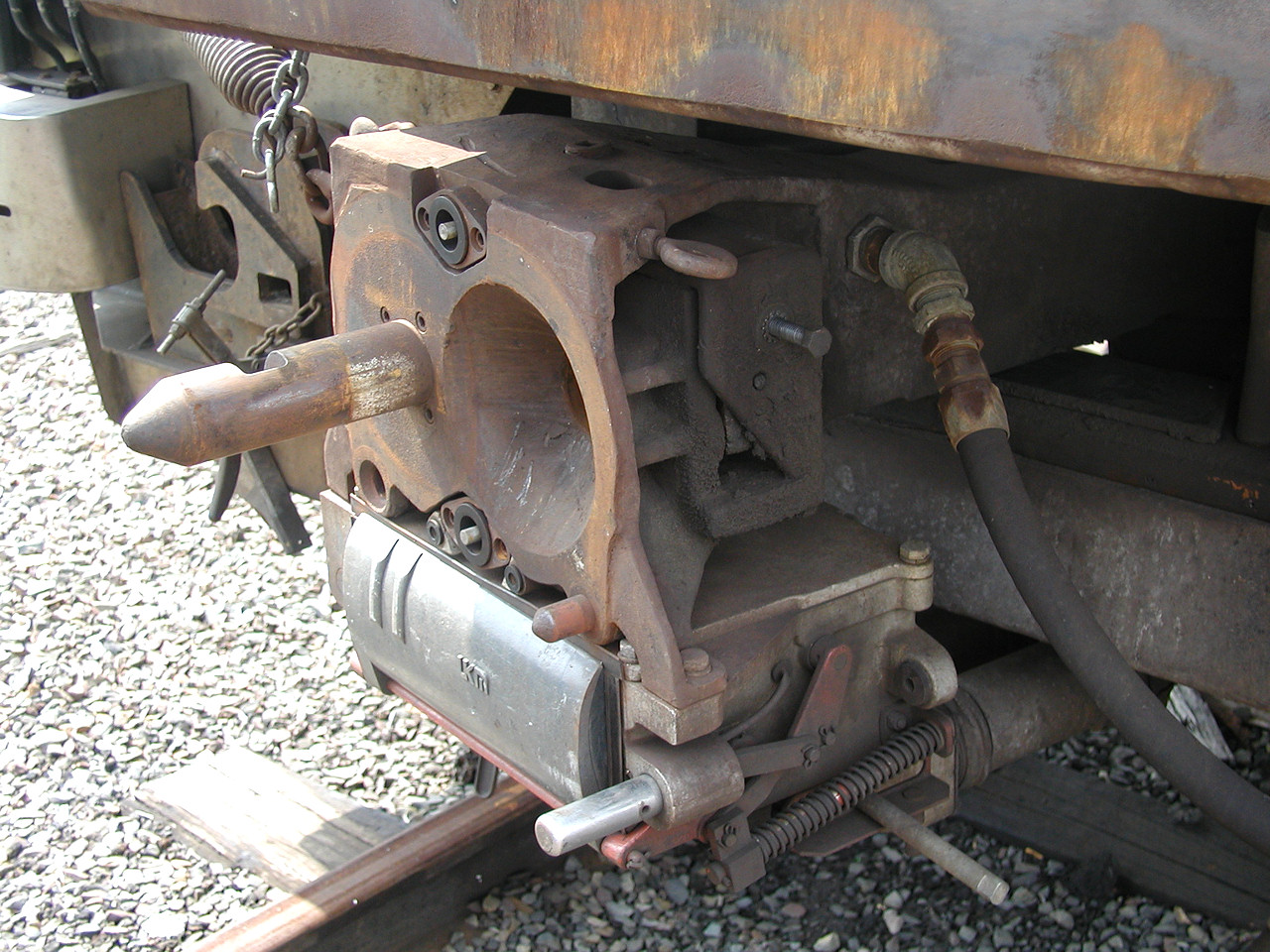
WABCO Model N-2 on a SEPTA Silverliner II

The WABCO N-Type coupler was first developed for the prototype Pittsburgh Skybus system, with the initial model, N-1, applied only to the three Skybus cars. The updated N-2 model, with a larger 4-inch (101.6 mm) gathering range, was first applied to the new "Airporter" rapid transit cars on the Cleveland Rapid Transit line. The model N-2 used lightweight draft gear slung below the center sill to allow wide swings needed to negotiate sharp curves. This made the N-2 unsuitable for mainline railroad use, so an updated version, N-2-A, was developed for that market. The first of these was fitted in 1968 to the UAC TurboTrain with 228 electrical contacts and the Budd Metropolitan EMU with 138 contacts. Starting in the 1970s, the N-2-A was fitted to the entire SEPTA Silverliner family of MU's, the NJT Arrow series of MU's and the Metro-North Railroad/Long Island Rail Road M series of MU railcars. The N-2 was also used by the PATCO Speedline, but was replaced due to issues with the electrical contacts. Later, WABCO would create a new model N-3 for the BART system with a 6-by-4-inch (152.4 mm × 101.6 mm) gathering range, which required a rectangular funnel.

The WABCO N-type is sometimes referred to as the pin and cup coupler or spear coupler.

=== Tomlinson ===
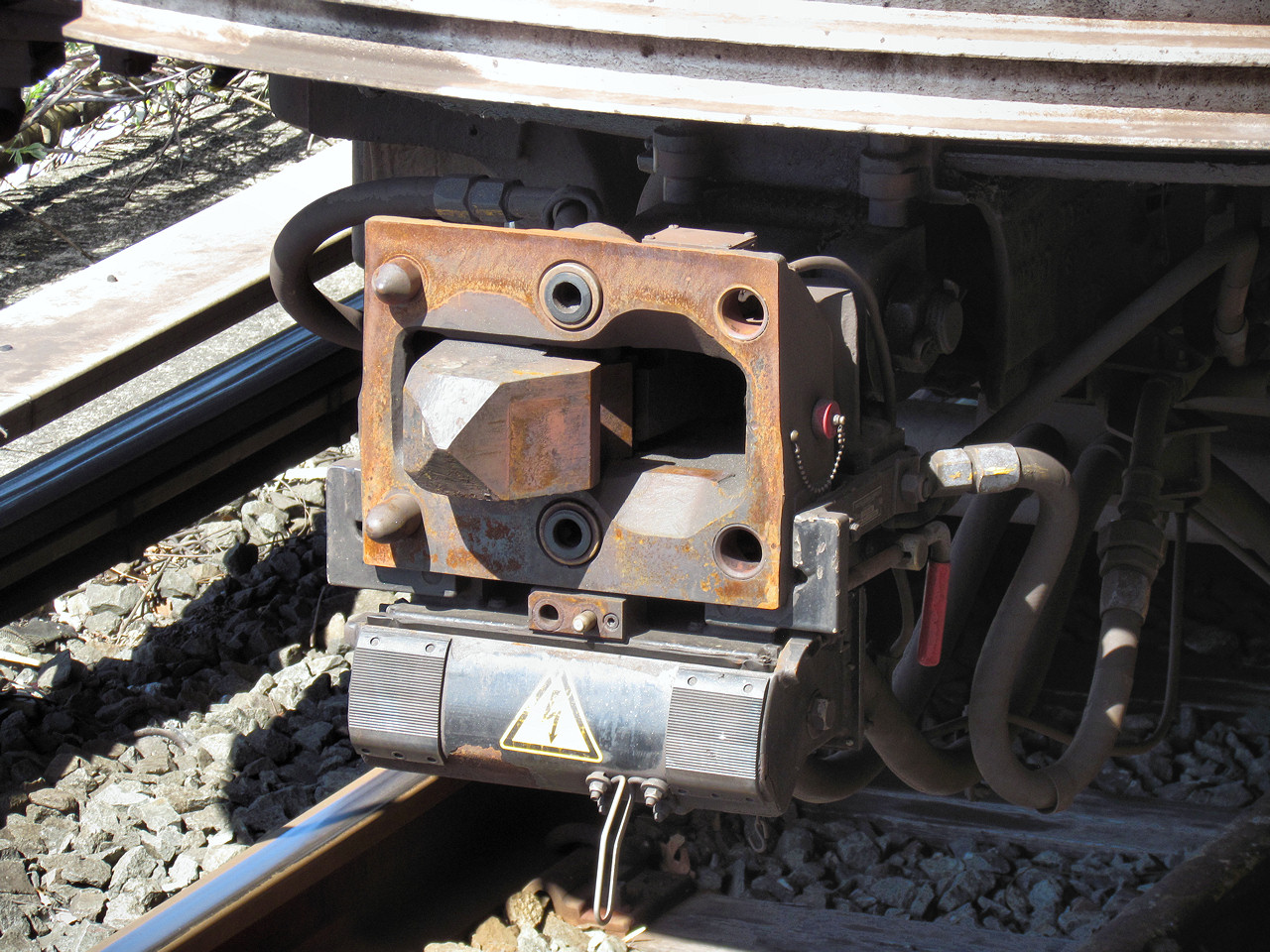
Tomlinson coupler as applied to a New York City Subway R46

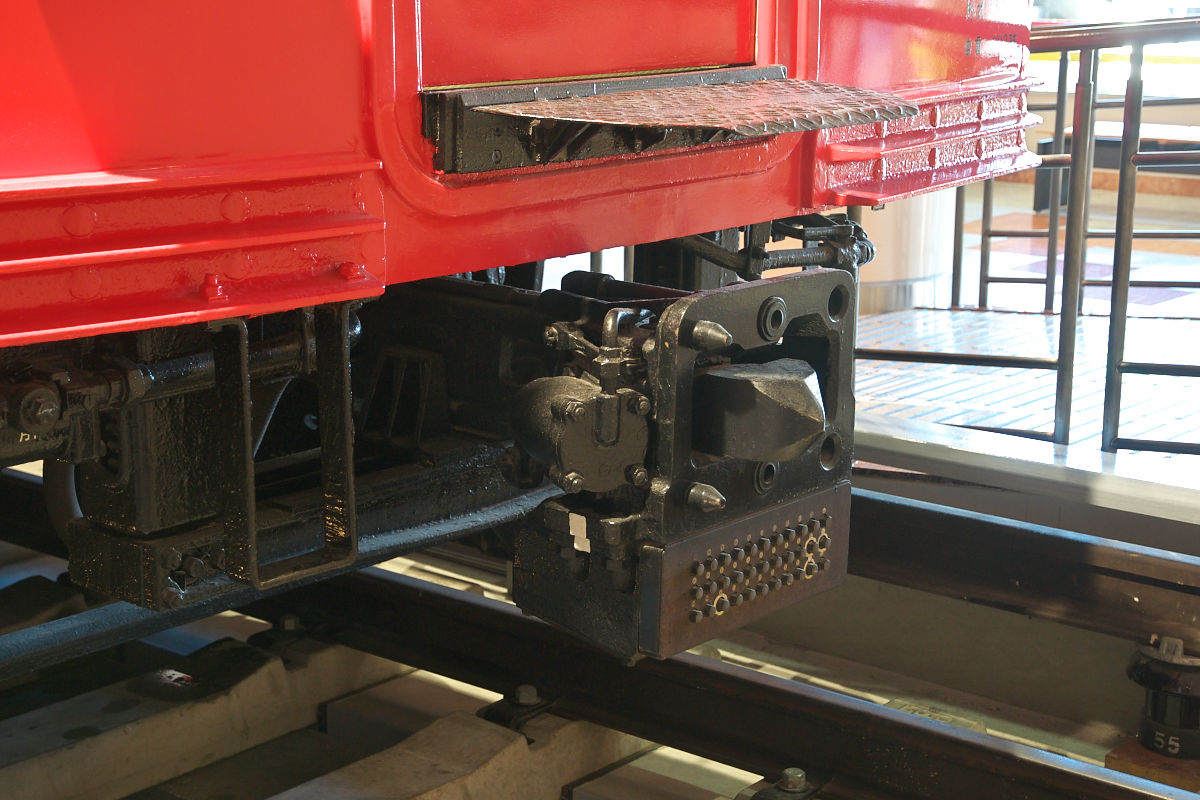
Tomlinson coupler as used on Eidan Subway (now Tokyo Metro) 300 series

The Tomlinson coupler was developed by the Ohio Brass Company for mass transit applications, but eventually found use in some mainline railroad vehicles as well. It consists of two squared metal hooks that engage with each other within a larger rectangular frame, with air-line connections above and below. Since the coupler's development, the manufacturing arm of Ohio Brass was acquired by WABCO, which now manufactures the line, including the N-type. The Tomlinson coupler is the most widely used fully automatic heavy rail coupling in North America having been adopted by the Washington Metro, Massachusetts Bay Transportation Authority, PATCO Speedline, SEPTA Broad Street Subway, Los Angeles Metro Rail, Baltimore Metro, Miami Metro, MARTA Rail and the New York City Subway for its R44/R46 fleet and all modern classes starting with the R142. For applications outside of rapid transit, the coupler had to be significantly enlarged to meet the increased strength requirements, first appearing in this capacity on the Budd Metroliner and later on the Illinois Central Highliner fleet. Its relative lack of strength is one reason the N-Type has been more successful in the mainline railroad arena.

Outside the United States, the Tomlinson coupler is used on Tokyo Metro's Ginza and Marunouchi Lines and on the heavy capacity Taipei Metro lines.

=== Scharfenberg ===
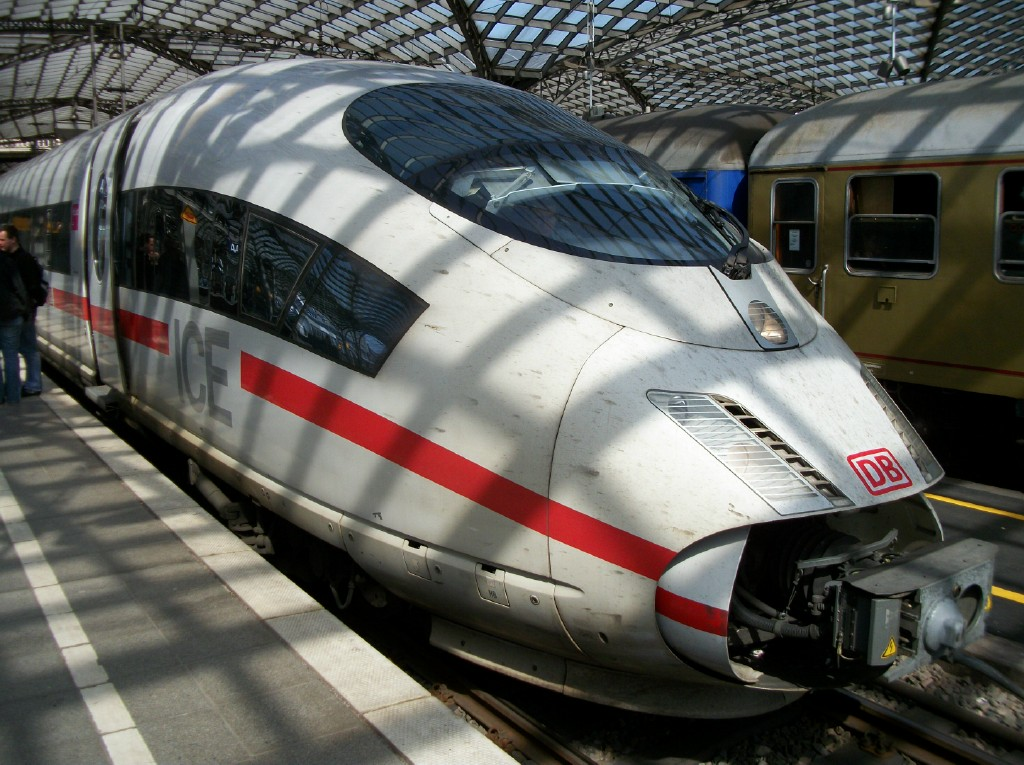
Scharfenberg coupler on an ICE 3

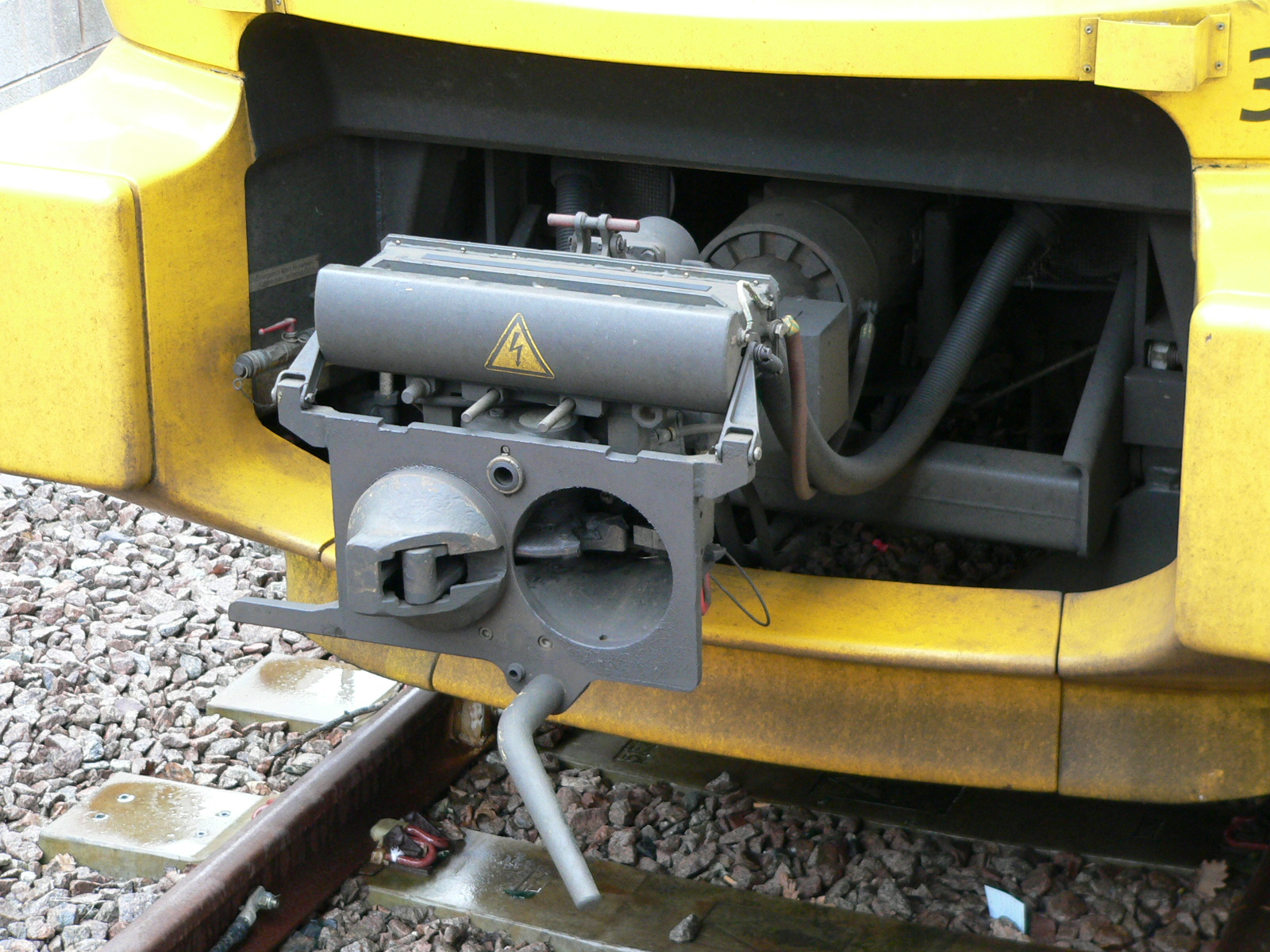
Scharfenberg coupler made by Dellner

The Scharfenberg coupler (German: Scharfenbergkupplung or Schaku) is probably the most commonly used type of fully automatic coupling. Designed in 1903 by Karl Scharfenberg in Königsberg, Germany (today Kaliningrad, Russia), it has gradually spread from transit trains to regular passenger service trains. However, outside Europe, its use is generally restricted to mass transit systems. The Schaku coupler is superior to many other automatic couplers because it automatically establishes pneumatic and electrical connections and can uncouple automatically. However, there is no standard for the placement of these electro-pneumatic connections. Some rail companies place them on the sides, while others place them above the mechanical portion of the Schaku coupler.

Small air cylinders, acting on the rotating heads of the coupler, ensure the Schaku coupler engagement, making it unnecessary to use shock to get a good coupling. Joining portions of a passenger train can be done at very low speed (less than 2 mph or 3.2 km/h in the final approach), so that the passengers are not jostled. Rail equipment manufacturers such as Bombardier offer the Schaku coupler as an option for their mass transit systems, passenger cars, and locomotives. In North America, all the trains of the Montreal Metro are equipped with it, as are new light rail systems in Denver, in Baltimore, and in New Jersey. It is also used on light rail vehicles in Portland, in Minneapolis, the Vancouver Skytrain, and Line 3 Scarborough in Toronto. In New Zealand, it is found on the electric AM class of Auckland's suburban rail network, and on the Matangi trains of Wellington. It also equips all the dedicated rolling stock used for the shuttle services in the Channel Tunnel.

The maximum tonnage is under 1,000 t (1,100 short tons; 980 long tons).

The Scharfenberg coupler head type 10 design is the prototype for the digital automatic coupling (DAC) used for European freight trains. The project is part of the EU's Shift2Rail initiative and aims to replace screw couplings in European freight transport. As part of the program, the manufacturers Dellner and Voith are, as of 2025, testing new coupling systems for freight trains. In addition to the DAC, the manufacturers are also developing a hybrid DAC for locomotives which can couple with either screw or DAC couplers.

=== Dellner coupler ===
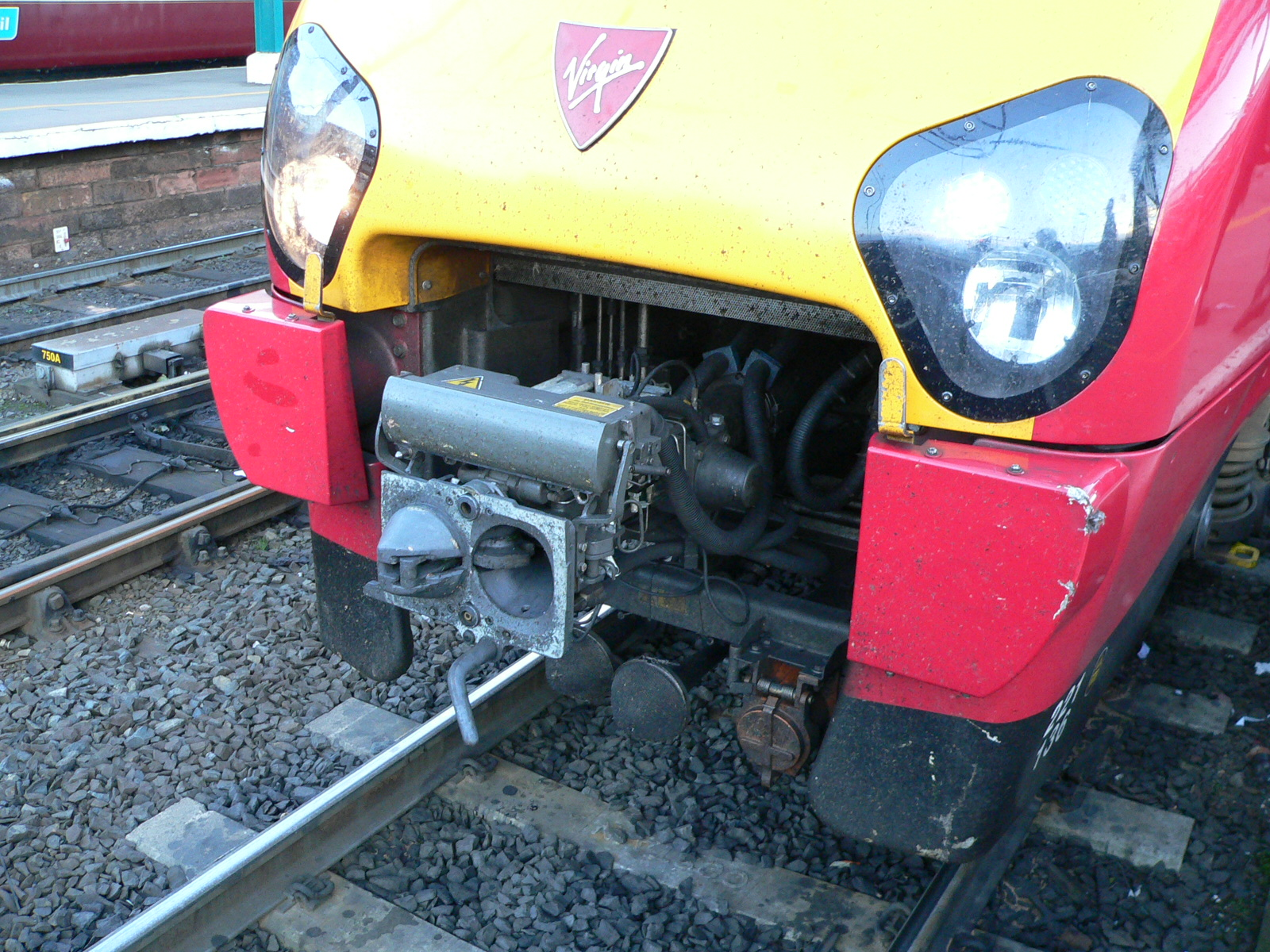
Dellner coupler on a Virgin CrossCountry Class 221 at Carlisle on 10 October 2005

Swedish coupling manufacturer Dellner has developed its own modular coupler design concept. It incorporates all common types of coupling heads for passenger trains.

Two Class 220 owned by CrossCountry joining together to form an eight-car unit.

Dellner also launched a proprietary coupler system: the automatic coupler with head type 12. It is based on the Scharfenberg/latch-type design. The modular coupling consists of a type 12 coupling head based on a single-position latch mechanism. The coupling head is in the same state in both coupled and uncoupled positions. The mechanism rotates only during the transition between the coupling or uncoupling process.

=== Wedglock coupler ===
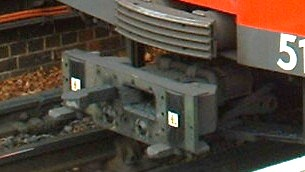
Wedglock coupler on a London Underground train

The Wedglock coupler is named for the pneumatic wedges that lock the moving parts of the coupler head in the engaged position. It is the standard automatic coupler used on London Underground trains. The coupler was introduced in 1936 and is manufactured by William Cook Rail and Voith. The face of the coupler has a protruding, movable tongue which is inserted into the throat of the opposite coupler during coupling. Once these mechanical elements are fully engaged, their positions are locked by wedges actuated by a pneumatic cylinder. The pneumatic ports are located below the mechanical connection. They are pressed together and sealed by rubber elements. On either side of the mechanical connection are electrical contact blocks consisting of a series of butt contacts. When disconnected, the contacts are protected by the so-called "Dutch oven" covers. The covers are mechanically actuated and swing open when the other coupling approaches. The coupling can be engaged and disengaged from the cab using a three-position coupling switch.

=== GF Coupler ===
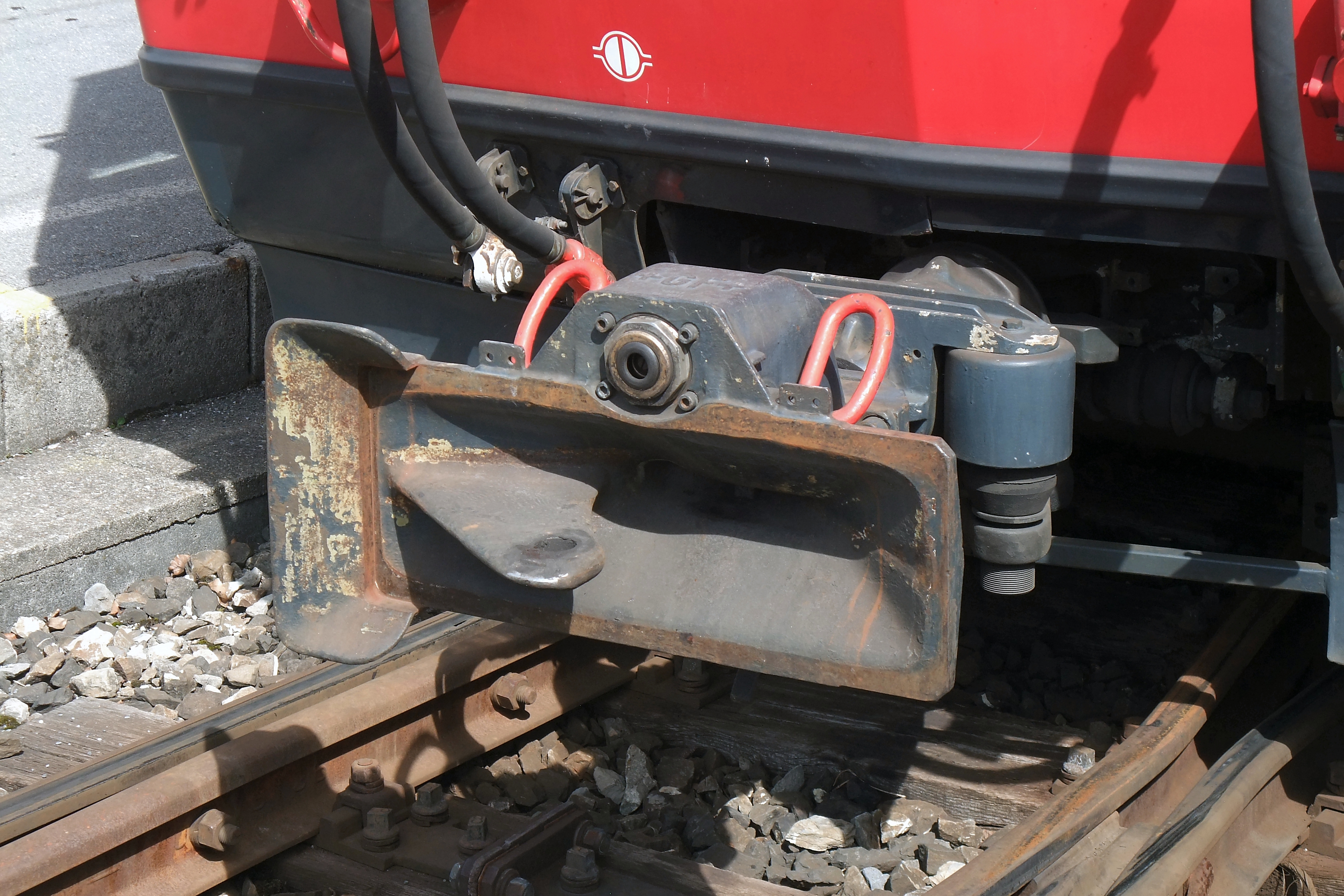
GFN coupler on an EMU of the Appenzell Railways

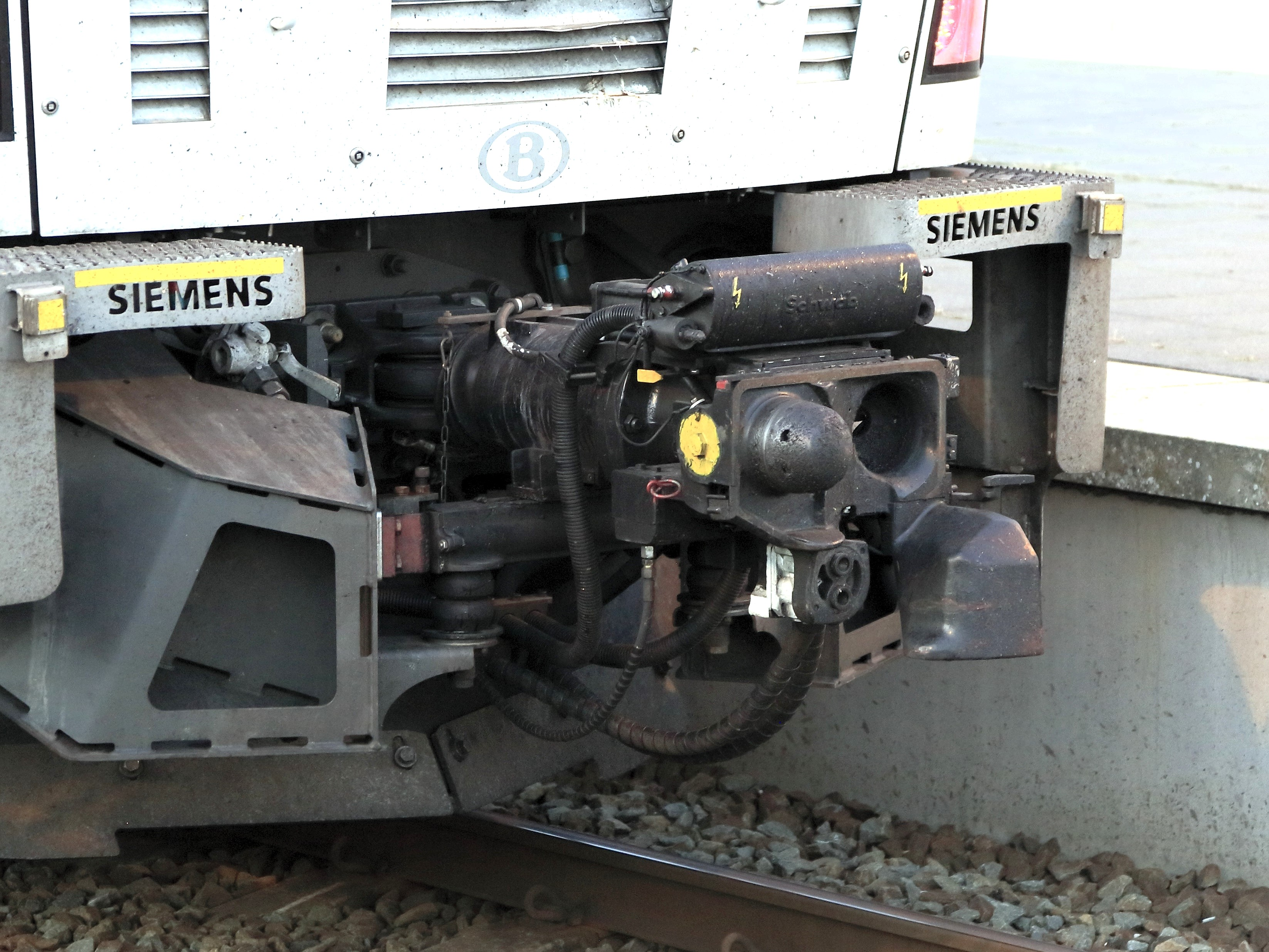
GFV coupler produced by the Schwab Verkehrstechnik AG

The GF coupler, sometimes also written as +GF+ coupler, is a coupler manufactured by Georg Fischer in Schaffhausen, Switzerland, and was widely used on Swiss railways and on vehicles produced by the Swiss railway industry. It was first shown at the Swiss National Exhibition in Bern in 1914. There were three variants available: the GFN type for interurban railways, the GFT type for trams, and the GFV type for mass transit.

==== GFN and GFT ====
The GFN and GFT types are very similar. The only difference is that the GFT is designed for lower forces as expected in tram service. Both couplings consist of a rectangular buffer that doubles as a throat. A horizontal tongue with a hole protrudes from the inside of the throat, into which the vertically arranged locking pin hooks. To uncouple, lift the locking pin using the handles located behind the coupler. Optionally, the air and electrical lines can also be connected. Air connections are typically located above and/or below the mechanical coupling. The electrical contacts, located above the coupler, are protected from contamination by a hinged cover when the coupler is uncoupled.

The first railways introducing the GFN type coupler were the Bern-Zollikofen-Bahn, now part of the Regionalverkehr Bern-Solothurn, the Aarau–Schöftland-Bahn, now part of the Wynental and Suhrental Railway, and the Biel–Täuffelen–Ins railway. Another important railway that uses the GFN-type coupler is the Brünig railway. The Strassenbahn Zürich–Oerlikon–Seebach first used the lighter GFT-type coupler and was later introduced across almost all tram services in Switzerland.

==== GFV ====
The GFV differs significantly from the GFN and GFT. It is typically designed as a fully automatic multi-function coupler that can be disengaged at the push of a button in the cab. The design is more similar to a Scharfenberg coupler. The mechanical connection is made by a hemispherical element protruding from the coupling head, which is inserted and locked into a half-shell-shaped pocket on the opposite coupling head. The two air connections are located one above the other, below the mechanical coupling, next to the guide horn, and the electrical connections are located above the coupling, as with the GFN and GFV types. The type was first introduced in 1965 with the so-called Gold Coast Express, which was used as the first mass-transit train in the Greater Zurich area. It is still widely used on Zürich S-Bahn equipment and in Belgium by the SNCB.

=== Schwab coupler ===
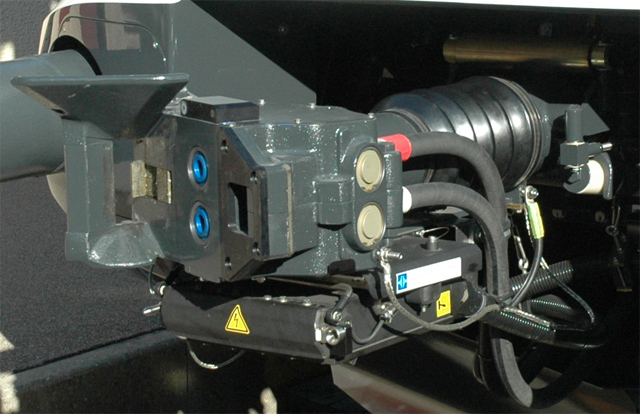
Schwab coupler FK-15-10 on a Stadler FLIRT of the Swiss Federal Railways (SBB)

The Schwab coupler is an automatic coupler manufactured by Schwab Verkehrstechnik AG, Schaffhausen, the legal successor to the Railway Coupler Division of Georg Fischer. The coupler automatically makes the mechanical, pneumatic, and electrical connections. The mechanical locks are located on either side of the pneumatic ports. The electrical connections are located below the pneumatic ports and are protected by a cover when disconnected. Several versions are available for different applications; they can only be coupled to each other, not to other couplings, except the FK-15-10 version, which can be coupled to the Scharfenberg coupling type 10. A special feature of the Schwab coupler is the inclined coupler face, which causes the coupler heads to slide past each other during coupling, so that snow and ice are scraped off the coupler faces in winter.

As of 2020, Schwab couplers are used primarily in Switzerland in regional rail passenger transport. Almost all vehicles fitted with Schwab couplers are manufactured by Stadler Rail. The best known exception is the ICN tilt trains operated by Swiss Federal Railways (SBB).

The following versions exist:

- standard gauge mainline railroads:
  - FK-15-12, which are used on Stadler KISS, Stadler GTW and Stadler FLIRT
  - FK-15-10, which is compatible with the Scharfenberg type 10 coupler
- metros and suburban railways: FK-9-6
- streetcars and narrow gauge railcars: FK-5.5-4 and FK-3-2.5

As of 2020, Wabtec is working on a digital automatic coupling (DAC) based on the Schwab coupler, a possible replacement of the screw couplers in the European rail freight service. The coupler can handle tensile forces up to 1500 kN and compressive forces up to 2000 kN and is therefore one of the strongest couplers ever designed for European railways.

=== Shibata coupler ===
The Shibata coupler is a variation of the Scharfenberg coupler, which was developed by Japanese Government Railways (JGR) engineer Mamoru Shibata in the 1930s for electric trains. (Note: From the early 1920s, JGR's EMUs were using Janney couplers.) It is the standard coupler type for all passenger trains in Japan as well as on commuter and subway trains in South Korea.

Shinkansen (bullet train) rolling stock uses a variation of the Shibata coupler developed by Sumitomo Metal Industries in the 1960s, which employs rotary tight-lock pins and, coincidentally, bears a closer resemblance to the Scharfenberg coupler than to the Shibata coupler.

Shibata couplers

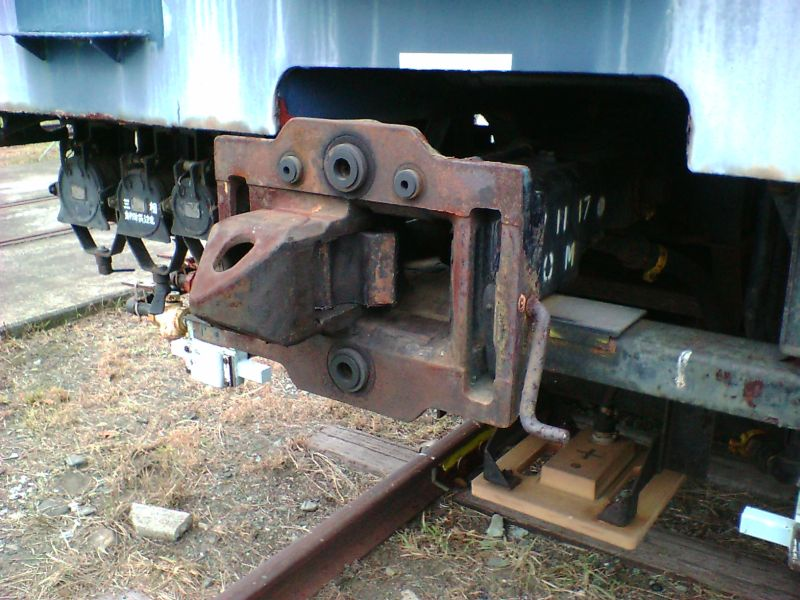
Shibata close contact ("Mitchaku") coupler

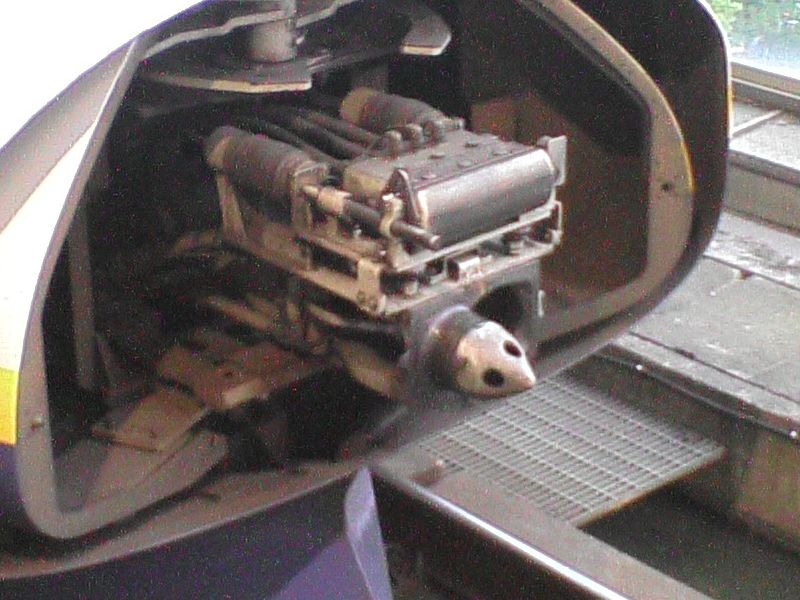
Shibata rotary coupler on E4 Series Shinkansen

== Dual couplings and match wagons ==
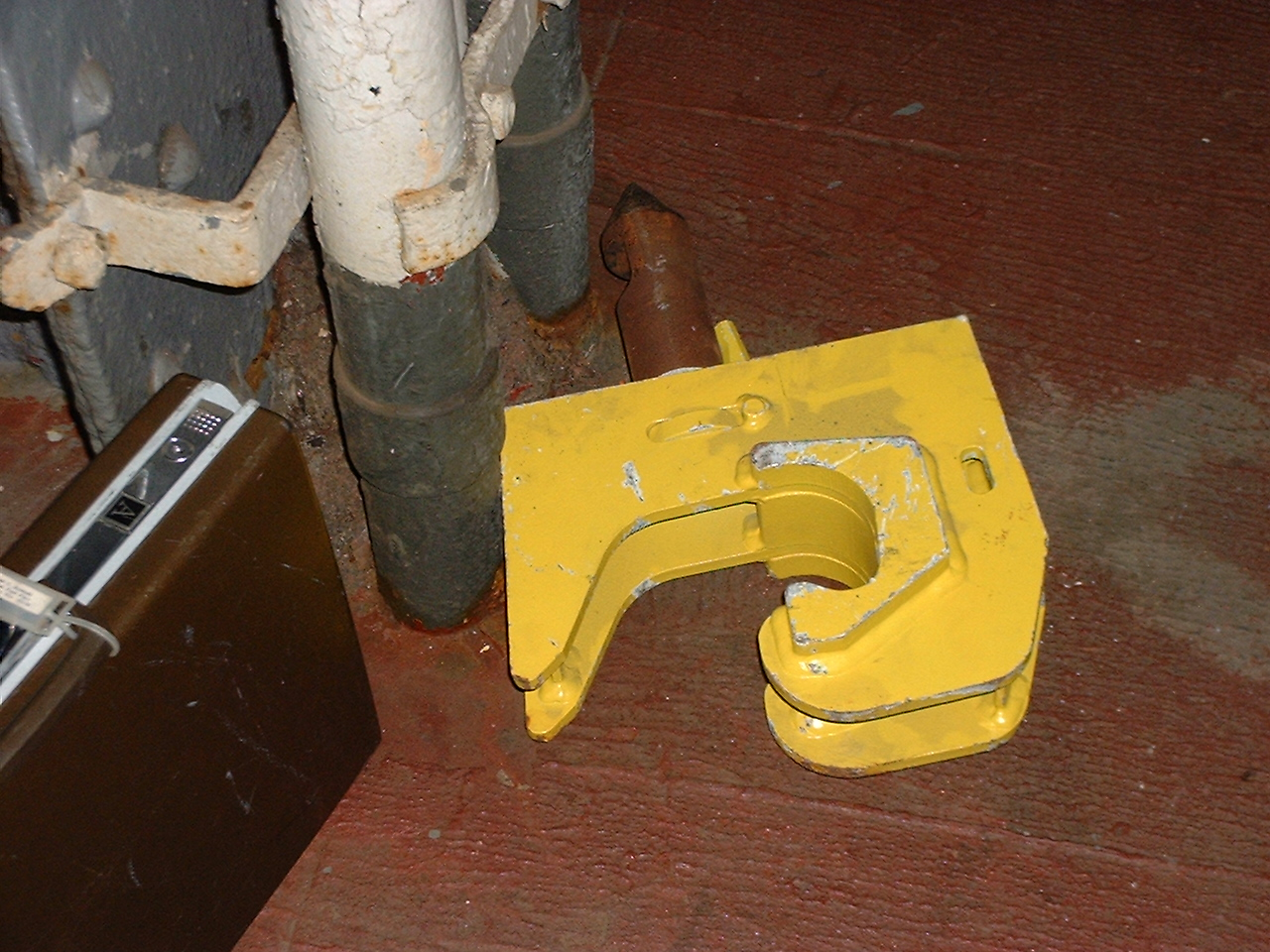
Coupling adapter for use between Janney coupler on a locomotive and WABCO N-2 couplers fitted to commuter rail multiple units at New York's Pennsylvania Station. The adapter is seen from the bottom.

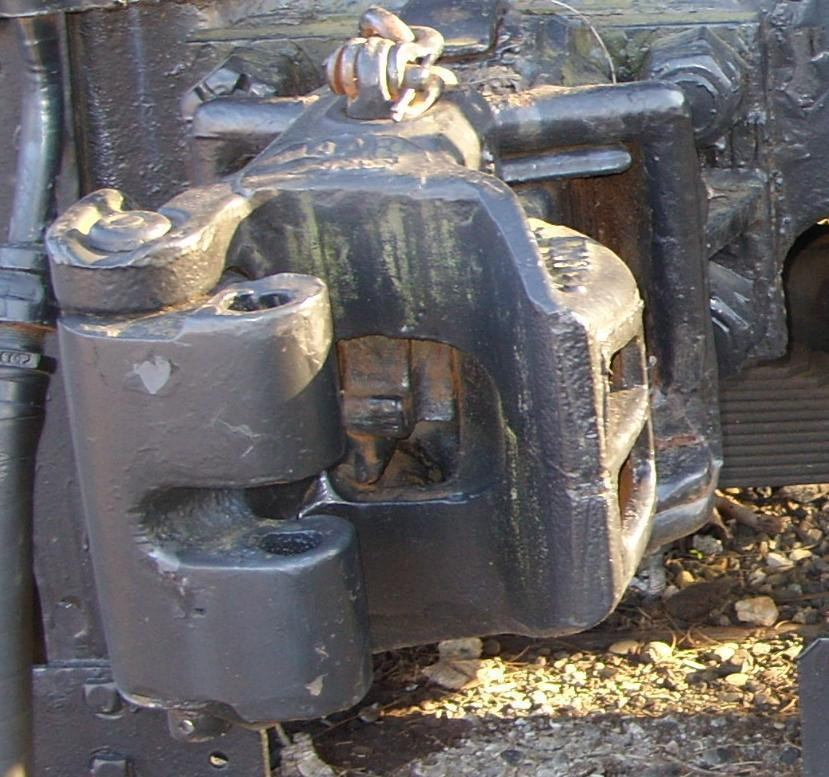
Transition era AAR knuckle coupler. The gap in the knuckle accommodates the link of a Johnston coupler or a link and pin coupler, and the vertical hole in the knuckle accommodates the pin.

Sometimes a wagon with one coupling system needs to be coupled to wagons with another coupling type. This may be needed when transporting metro rolling stock from its manufacturer to the city where it will be used. There are two solutions:

- use a barrier vehicle(s) which has different couplings at either end.
- use a coupling adaptor.
- use a match wagon which has the same dual coupling at both ends.

Only some kinds of couplings coexist on the end of a wagon at the same time, because, amongst other reasons, they need to be at the same height. For example, in the Australian state of Victoria, engines had the AAR coupler, with buffers, and the chain mounted on a lug cast into the AAR coupler.

A barrier vehicle / wagon in Britain and "transition car" in North America) has different kinds of couplings at each end. If a pair of barrier vehicles is used, a rake of wagons using coupling A can be inserted into a train otherwise using coupling B.

A coupling adaptor or compromise coupler might couple to an AAR coupling on a wagon, and present, for example, a meatchopper coupler or rapid transit coupler to the next wagon. Such an adaptor might weigh 100 kg (220 lb). An adapter piece allows a Janney coupler to mate with an SA3 coupler.

=== Sets of carriages ===
Automatic couplers like the Janney are safer in a collision because they help prevent the carriages from telescoping. British Rail therefore decided to adopt a Janney variant for its passenger carriages, with the coupler able to swing out of the way for coupling to engines using the traditional buffer-and-chain system.

In New South Wales, sets of carriages were permanently coupled with a fixed bar, since the carriages were disconnected only at the workshops. Freight cars are sometimes coupled in pairs or triplets, using bar couplings in between.

Articulated sets of carriages or wagons share the intermediate bogies, and do not need couplings in the intermediate positions.

== Brake couplings ==
Couplings are needed for any continuous braking systems.

=== Electronically controlled brakes ===
Electronically controlled pneumatic brakes (ECP) require a method of connecting electrically adjacent wagons for both power and command signals, which can be achieved using plugs and sockets or very short-range radio signals.

== Draw gear ==
A draw gear (also known as a draft gear) is the assembly behind the coupling at each end of the wagon to take care of the compression and tension forces between the wagons of trains. Early draw gears were made of wood, a material that was gradually replaced by steel.

Janney couplers have the draft gear in a center sill to absorb the pushing and pulling forces (slack action).

There is also a draw gear behind tightlock couplers, SA3 couplers, C-AKv couplers, Scharfenberg couplers, and other multi-function couplers.

In the case of buffers and chain couplers, the draw gear behind the hooks, if any, will absorb the tension, while the side buffers will absorb the compression.

Some couplers may not have a draw gear.

== Model railway couplers ==
On model railroads, couplers vary according to scale and have evolved over many years. Early model trains were coupled using various hook-and-loop arrangements, which were often asymmetrical, requiring all cars to point in the same direction. At larger scales, working-scale or near-scale models of Janney couplers were quite common, but proved impractical in HO and smaller scales.

For many years, the "X2F" or "Horn-Hook" coupler was quite common in HO scale, as it could be produced as a single piece of molded plastic. Similarly, for many years, a "lift-hook" coupler known as the Rapido and developed by Arnold, a German manufacturer of N-scale model trains, was commonly used in that scale.

The chief competitor to both of these couplers, more popular among serious modelers, was the Magne-Matic, a magnetically released knuckle coupler developed by Keith and Dale Edwards and manufactured by Kadee, a company they founded. While they closely resemble miniature Janney couplers, they are somewhat different mechanically, with the knuckle pivoting from the center of the coupler head, rather than from the side. A steel pin, designed to resemble an air brake hose, allows the couplers to be released magnetically; the coupler head's design prevents this unless the train is stopped or reversed, with a mated pair of couplers directly over an uncoupling magnet. An earlier, mechanically tripped version of the design had a straight pin extending down from the knuckle itself, engaging a diamond-shaped mechanical "ramp" between the rails that had to be raised above rail height when uncoupling was desired.

Once the Kadee patents expired, several other manufacturers began producing similar (and compatible) magnetic knuckle couplers.

An exact-scale HO model of the AAR coupler has been designed and manufactured by Frank Sergent. This design uses a tiny stainless steel ball to lock the knuckle closed. Uncoupling is achieved by holding a magnetic wand over the coupler pair to draw the balls out of the locking pockets.

In O scale, an exact-scale working miniature version of the "Alliance" coupler was manufactured by GAGO Models in Australia from the 1980s onward. Since 2002, it has been marketed by the Waratah Model Railway Company. European modelers tend to use scale hook and chain couplings.

In British 00 scale (similar to H0 scale) models, the 'tension lock' coupler developed by Tri-ang is standard. This is similar in operation to the meatchopper-type coupling. Remote uncoupling is possible by using a sprung ramp between the rails. The design of the hooks ensures that the couplings will not uncouple under tension (instead, depressing the ramp). When the train is pushed over the ramp, it will lift the coupling hooks as the train passes over. Halting the train over the ramp splits it here. While it works well, it is often seen as ugly and obtrusive (although smaller designs are available, these are not always fully compatible with other models), and many British modelers prefer to retrofit either Kadee types or working hook and chain couplings.

A recent development is an interchangeable coupling which plugs into a standardized socket, known as NEM 362, and which can be easily unplugged as required. This allows the modeler to easily standardize on the desired coupling, without individual manufacturers needing to change their coupling type.

In 7 mm scale, scale working Norwegian couplings are now being manufactured by Zamzoodled in the UK.

A comparison of coupler types was published in "An Introduction to Couplers".

=== Wooden and plastic trains ===
Toy trains have a wide variety of incompatible couplers. for example, most wooden train companies like Brio, Thomas Wooden Railway, and Whittle Shortline use standard magnets for connecting different trains and freight cars to each other. Other forms of connection feature white plastic hook-and-loop couplers, mainly used by the Japanese company Plarail.

== Accidents ==
Different kinds of coupling have different accident rates.

- The Murulla rail accident of 1926 involved the breakage of a "drawhook" leading to a downhill runaway and then a collision. Drawhooks imply "buffers and chain couplers".
- Round Oak rail accident – 1858 – coupling broke, and the rear of the train rolled back.

== See also ==
- Buckeye Steel Castings
- Drawbar
- Gangway connection
- Gender of connectors and fasteners
- Jane's World Railways - lists the couplers used on every railway system
- Railway coupling by country
- Railway coupling conversion
- Slack action
- Three-point hitch
