= Schwab Verkehrstechnik AG =

Swiss manufacturer of energy absorption systems

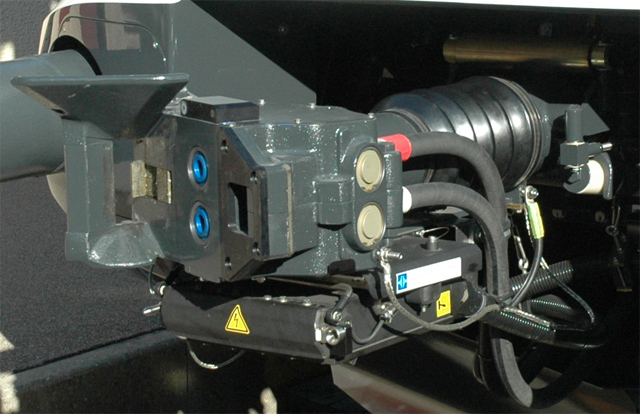
Schwab coupler type FK-15-10

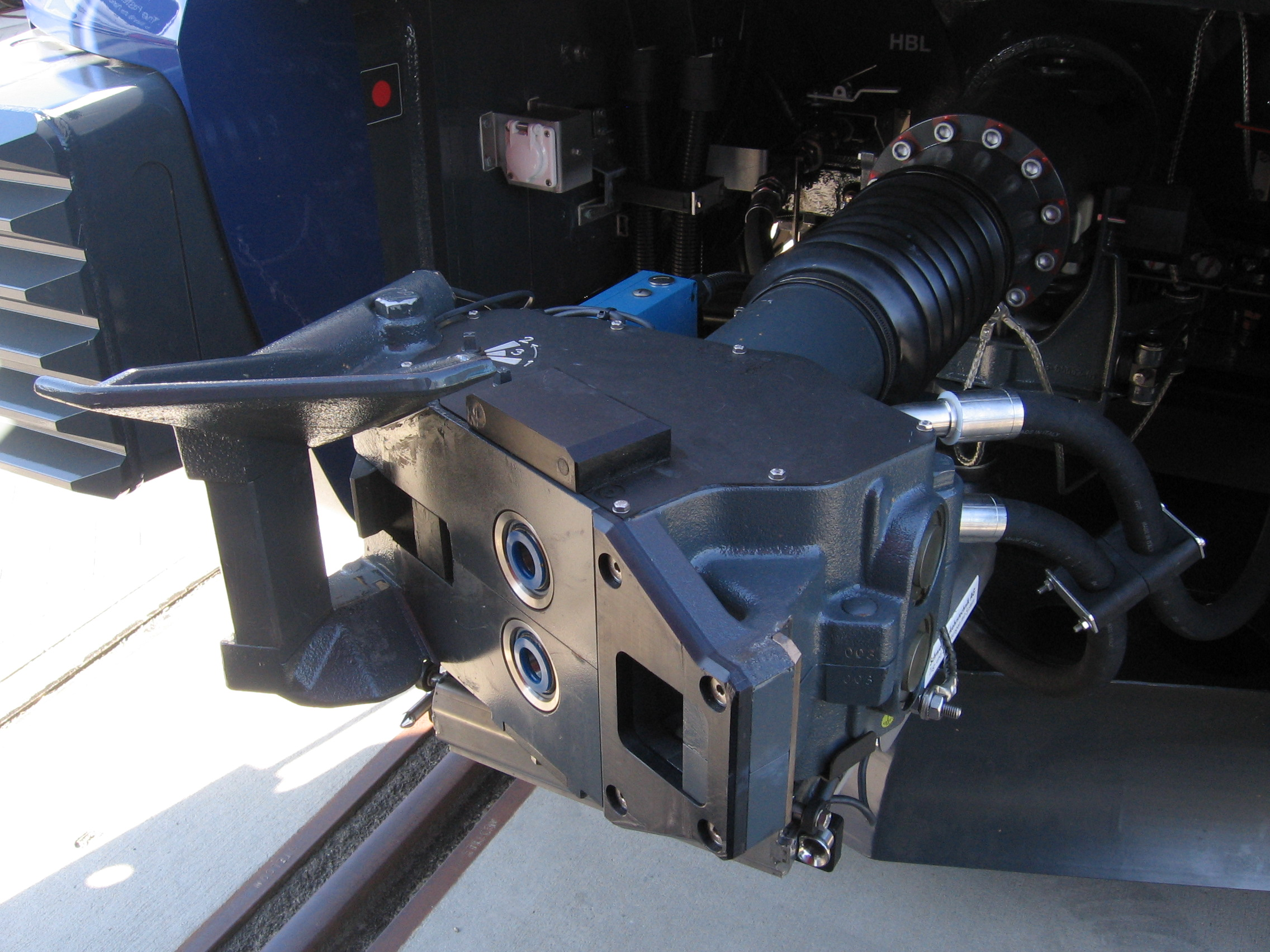
SBB RABe 511 coupler (Schwab coupler)

Schwab Verkehrstechnik AG is a Swiss manufacturer of energy absorption systems for railway vehicles. The company develops, manufactures and markets basically two product lines: couplings and buffers.

== Basics ==
The company is based in Schaffhausen, Switzerland and employed, by end of 2011, 39 people.

It was acquired in 2012 by Faiveley Transport.
