= Victorian Railways box and louvre vans =

Victorian Railways box and louvre vans may refer to:

- Victorian Railways box vans
- Victorian Railways iced vans
- Victorian Railways louvre vans
