= Andrew Jackson Beard =

American inventor (c.1849–1921)

- Born: March 29, 1849; Pinson, Alabama, U.S.
- Died: May 10, 1921 (aged 72); Birmingham, Alabama, U.S.

Andrew Jackson Beard (March 29, 1849 – May 10, 1921) was a black inventor, who introduced five improvements to the automatic railroad car coupler in 1897 and 1899, and was inducted into the National Inventors Hall of Fame in Akron, Ohio in 2006 for this achievement.

== Life and career ==
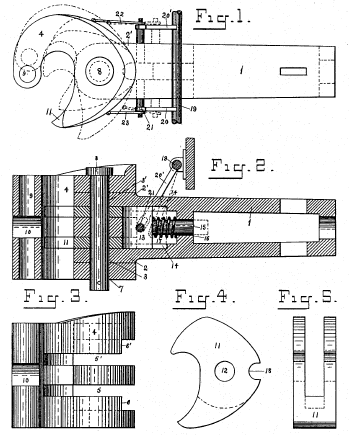
The diagram from Beard's 1897 coupler patent.

Born on March 29, 1849, Andrew Beard spent the first fifteen years of his life as a slave on a small farm in Eastlake, Alabama. A year after he was emancipated, he married and became a farmer in Pinson, a city just outside Birmingham, Alabama.

In 1872, after working in a flour mill in Hardwicks, Alabama, Beard built his own flour mill, which he operated successfully for many years. In 1881, he patented a new double plow design that allowed to adjust the distance between the plow plates (U.S. patent 240,642), which he later sold in 1884 for $4000 (equivalent to $140,000 in 2025). After the sale of his first patent, Beard returned to farming. In 1887, he patented a second double plow design that allowed for pitch adjustment, (U.S. patent 347,220), which he sold for $5,200 (equivalent to $190,000 in 2025), and invested his earnings into real estate.

In 1889 Beard who at the time was living near East Lake, purchased 4 lots that cost him $3,000. On January 19th, 1889, Mr. Cashin attorney at Law of Montgomery, stated that he intends with the help of such men as Andy Beard and Mr Billingslea to build the university, one wing of which will be known as the Andy Beard Hall.

Following his stint in real-estate, Andrew Beard began to work with and study engines. In 1882, he patented a design for a new rotary steam engine, and took out two patents (U.S. patent 433,847 and U.S. patent 478,271). In 1890 and 1892, while living in Woodlawn, Beard patented two improvements to the Janney coupler, (invented by Eli H. Janney in 1873 – U.S. patent 138,405). The coupler Beard improved was used to hook railroad cars together, Beard himself had lost a leg in a car coupling accident. Beard's patents were U.S. patent 594,059, granted on 23 November 1897 and U.S. patent 624,901 granted 16 May 1899. The former was sold for $50,000 in 1897 (equivalent to $1.9 million in 2025).

May 24, 1890, Beard is acknowledged by a writer in the American Baptist for his inventions "without education". His Beard Rotary Steam Engine which virtually has no dead center, but starts from whatever position stopped was credited as fastest revolutions on record in the Birmingham Evening Times office. He was acknowledged as being a deacon of the Second Baptist Church in Birmingham. Beard sold a one-fourth interest in his invention to Rev R.J. Waldrup, the Baptist Minister, for $17,000, of which $5,000 was paid cash. Shortly following Beard traveled to Washington to patent his engine.

Beard's railroad car coupler improvement included two horizontal jaws, which automatically locked together upon joining. There is little evidence Beard's improvements were widely implemented with manufacturers instead standardizing on the MCB-5 or Type C contour in 1893, then in 1915 on the improved MCB-10 or Type D contour, and again in 1932 on the AAR-10A or Type E contour. In 1887, the same year Beard's first improvement of the automatic coupler was patented, the US Congress passed the Federal Safety Appliance Act, which made it illegal to operate any railroad car without automatic couplers.

Little is known about the period of time from Beard's last patent application in 1897 up until his death, but he reportedly became paralyzed and impoverished in his later years. He died on May 10, 1921, in Birmingham.
