= ESS 100/200/300/400/700 Series =

Electric passenger train

ESS 100/200/300/400/700 series
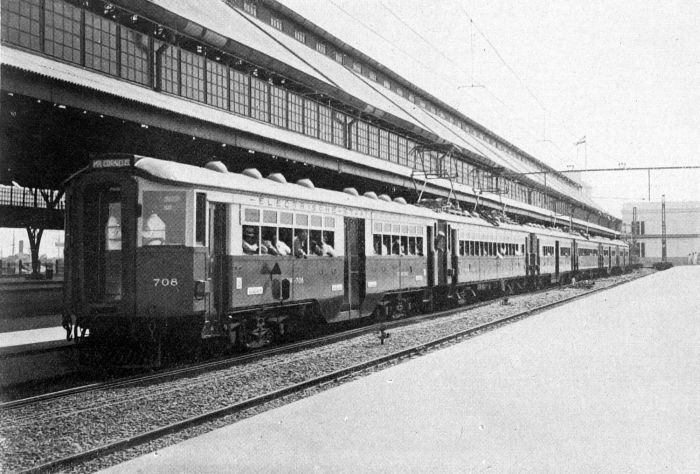
- ESS Electric Trainset VCW 700 and MABW 100 series preparation for depart to Meester Cornelis (Djatinegara) at Tandjoeng Priok Railway Station c. 1925
Type and origin
- Power type: Electric
- Builder: GE Transportation, Westinghouse, WABCO, Beijnes, Allan & Co., and Werkspoor
- Serial number: 100/200/300/400/700
- Build date: 1924 - 1927
- Total produced: 50
Specifications
- Configuration
  - AAR: Bo-Bo+2-2
  - UIC: (Bo-Bo)+(2-2)+(2-2)/(2-2)+(Bo-Bo)+(Bo-Bo)+(2-2)+(2-2)+(Bo-Bo) or Mc+Tc+Tc/Tc+Mc+Mc+Tc+Tc+Mc
- Length: 17,080 mm for 100 series, 300 series and 400 series; 17,380 mm for 200 series; 16,400 mm for 700 series
- Electric system/s: 1,500 V DC
- Current pickup: pantograph
- Traction motors: GE 289A
- Couplers: Henricot Coupler
Career
- Number in class: 50
- Numbers: 101-110; 201-210; 301-303; 401-402; 701-726
- First run: 6 April 1925
- Last run: 1966 (as EMU) 1980s (as DEMU)
- Retired: 1966
- Withdrawn: 1966
- Preserved: 1

The Elektrische Staatsspoorwegen (ESS) 100/200/300/400/700 series were the first electric multiple units to be operated during the Dutch East Indies colonial era. It was manufactured by Werkspoor, Allan and Beijnes in Beverwijk, with electrical equipment supplied by General Electric and Westinghouse. This EMU was one of the first passenger trains in Indonesia to feature a steel body and was also the first to sport a cream-and-green livery, which would be used by the Indonesian railways after independence until the early 1990s.

== History ==
=== Background ===
Began early 1910s, the State Railway Company, or Staatsspoorwegen, had completed the purchase of the Batavia–Buitenzorg railway line from the Nederlandsch Indische Spoorweg Maatschappij. The Staatsspoorwegen then reorganised the railway network in Batavia with the completion of the double-track line through Batavia and Manggarai Station. In 1917, Staatsspoorwegen (SS) planned to electrify the Batavia urban railway line. However, these plans had to be postponed due to the outbreak of the First World War, which led to a severe deterioration in the company's financial position. The plan resurfaced in the early 1920s, when the Staatsspoorwegen began to seriously conduct studies on the electrification of the Batavia urban railway network. As a first step, the Staatsspoorwegen established the Elektrische Staatsspoorwegen (ESS) and built several hydroelectric power stations, such as the Ubrug and Karacak hydroelectric power stations, to support the electrification of the railway lines within the Batavia urban area. ESS subsequently ordered 50 electric multiple units from the manufacturers Beijnes, Allan & Co. and Werkspoor, fitted with electrical components from General Electric and Westinghouse.

=== Early Operational Service ===
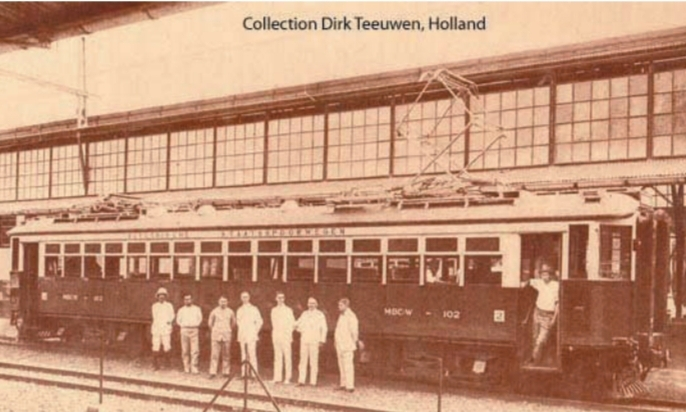
A Electric Train MBCW 100 Series later MABW 100 Series at Passar Senen Station c. 1924

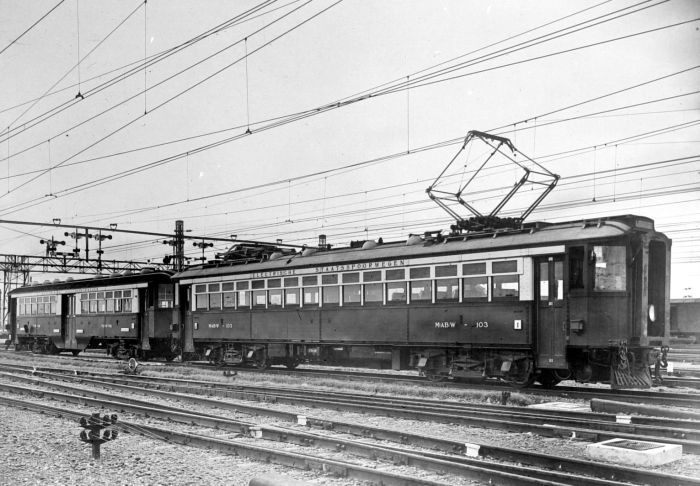
ESS MABW 100 and VCW 700 Series at Tandjoeng Priok Railway Station emplacement c. 1925

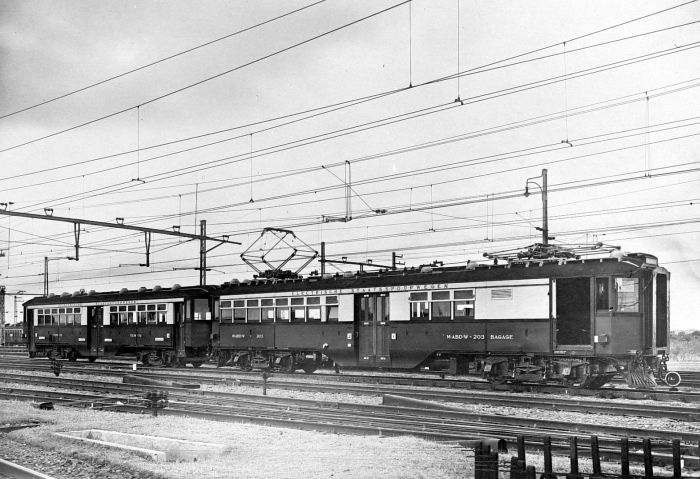
ESS 200 and 700 series at Tandjoeng Priok Railway Station circa. 1927

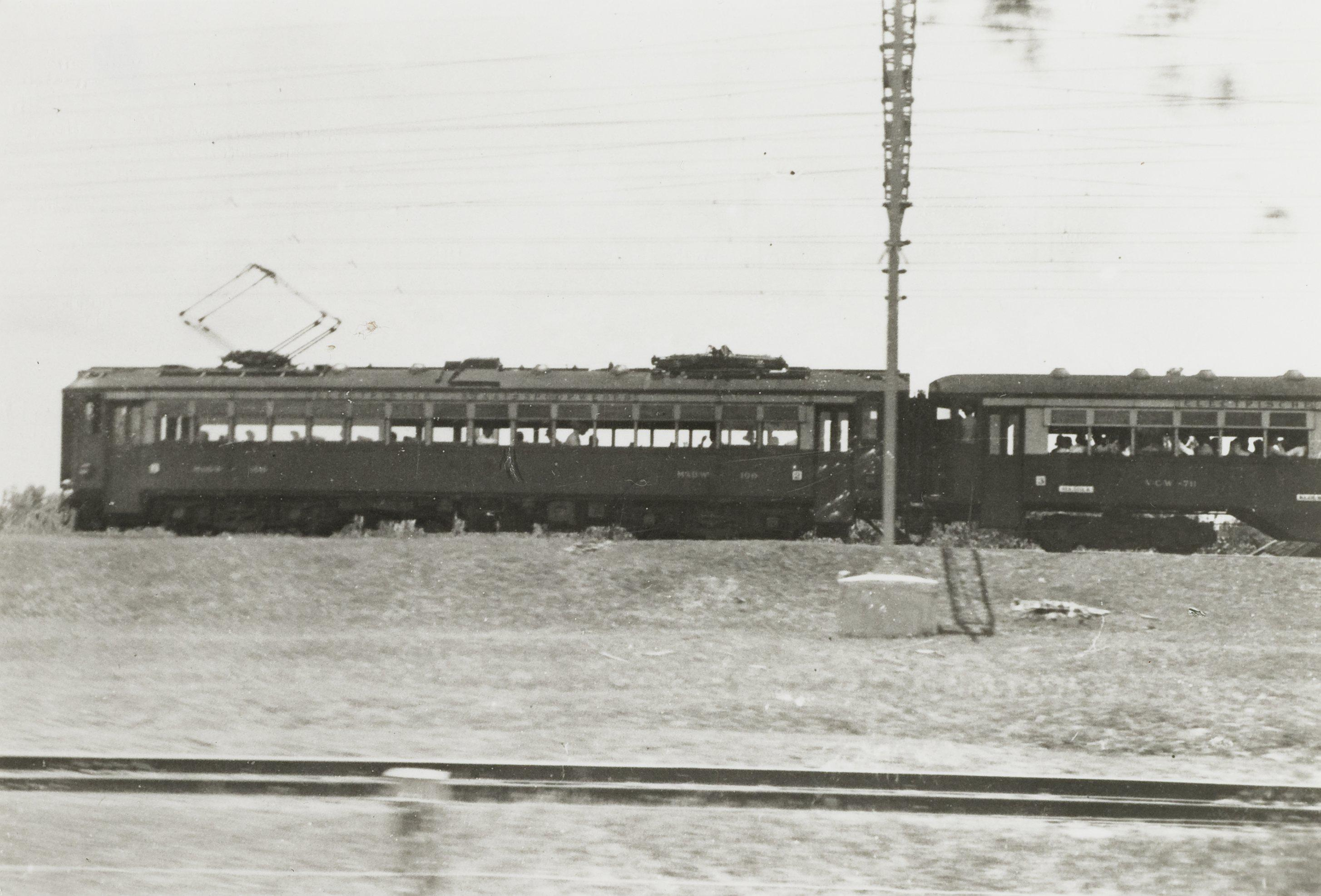
The MABW with number 106 and VCW number 700 passing Antjol area in the year of 1931

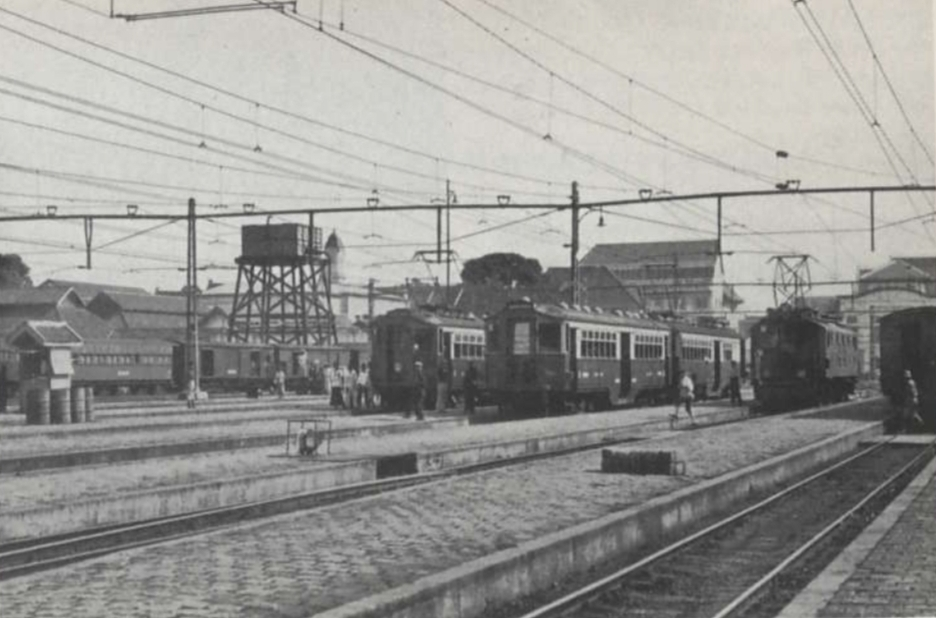
The Electric Multiple unit stabling at Batavia Noord c. 1928

These electric multiple units began to be introduced between 1924 and 1927. They were first tested on the Tandjoeng Priok–Meester Cornelis (Jatinegara) route on 23 December 1924 and officially entered service on 6 April 1925. These electric trains were part of the development of environmentally friendly public transport technology and were the first electric trains in South Asia and South-East Asia.

In the early days of its operation, this electric multiple unit primarily served the route from Tandjoeng Priok Station to Meester Cornelis Station. However, the electric multiple unit operational route was extended following the electrification of the line from Batavia Noord Station to Meester Cornelis Station via Batavia Koningsplein Station in mid-1927. This did not last long, as the electric multiple unit route was subsequently extended to Buitenzorg Station in 1930.

=== Japanese occupation ===
During the Japanese occupation in 1942, the electric multiple units fleet belonging to the Elektrische Staatsspoorwegen was taken over by the Japanese military government through the Riyoku Soyoku until 1945. These electric multiple units fleet continued to operate as normal.

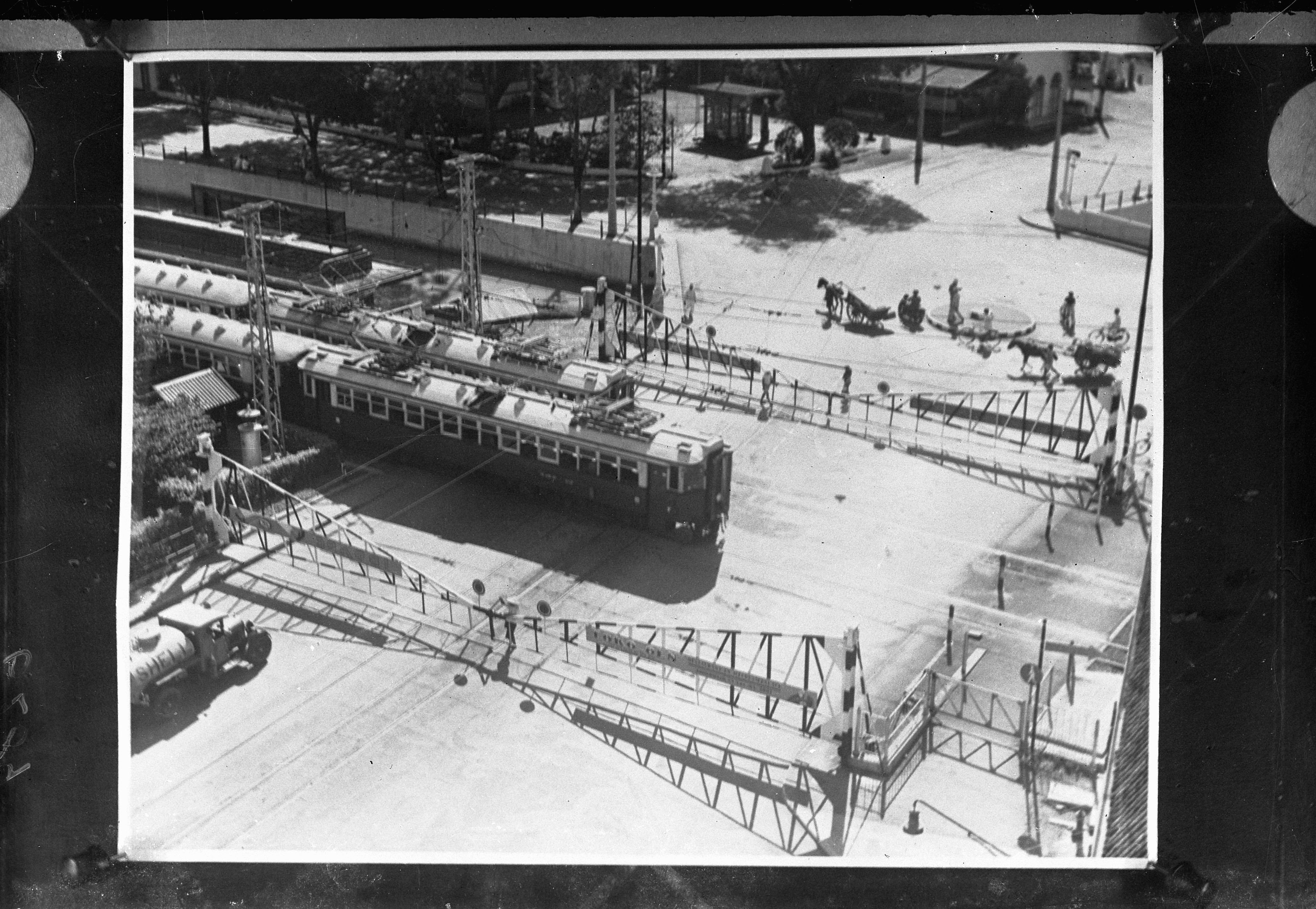
The Two Electric Trainset passing Pintoe Air level crossing c. 1945

=== Post-independence ===
Following independence and the War of Independence between 1945 and 1950, 50 electric trains were subsequently taken over by the Indonesian government through the State Railway Corporation (DKA) in early 1950. These 50 electric trains, a legacy of ESS, operated as normal to serve passengers in the Greater Jakarta area.

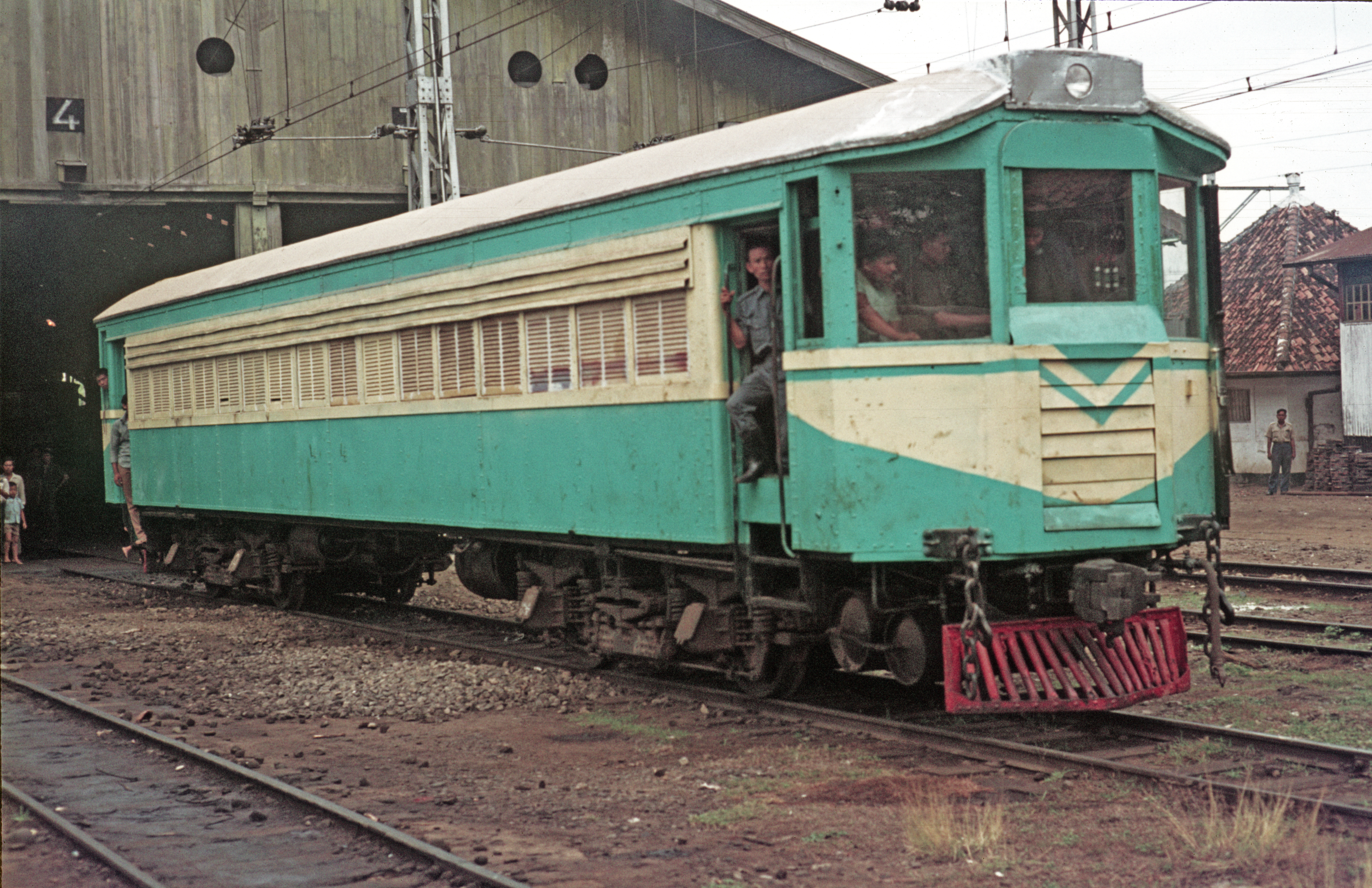
Diesel Multiple Unit ex. ESS EMU

By the 1960s, the condition of these electric railcars had become increasingly concerning, with many components—such as the traction motors from GE and Westinghouse no longer functioning optimally. Consequently, some motor cars were converted into diesel railcars fitted with Detroit V8 engines, whilst the trailers were converted into standard carriages for use on local services. Eventually, these electric multiple units were retired from service in 1966.

== Design ==
This electric multiple unit was derived from interurban trains in the United States. However, this design was developed specifically for the Dutch East Indies and was not used in the Netherlands.

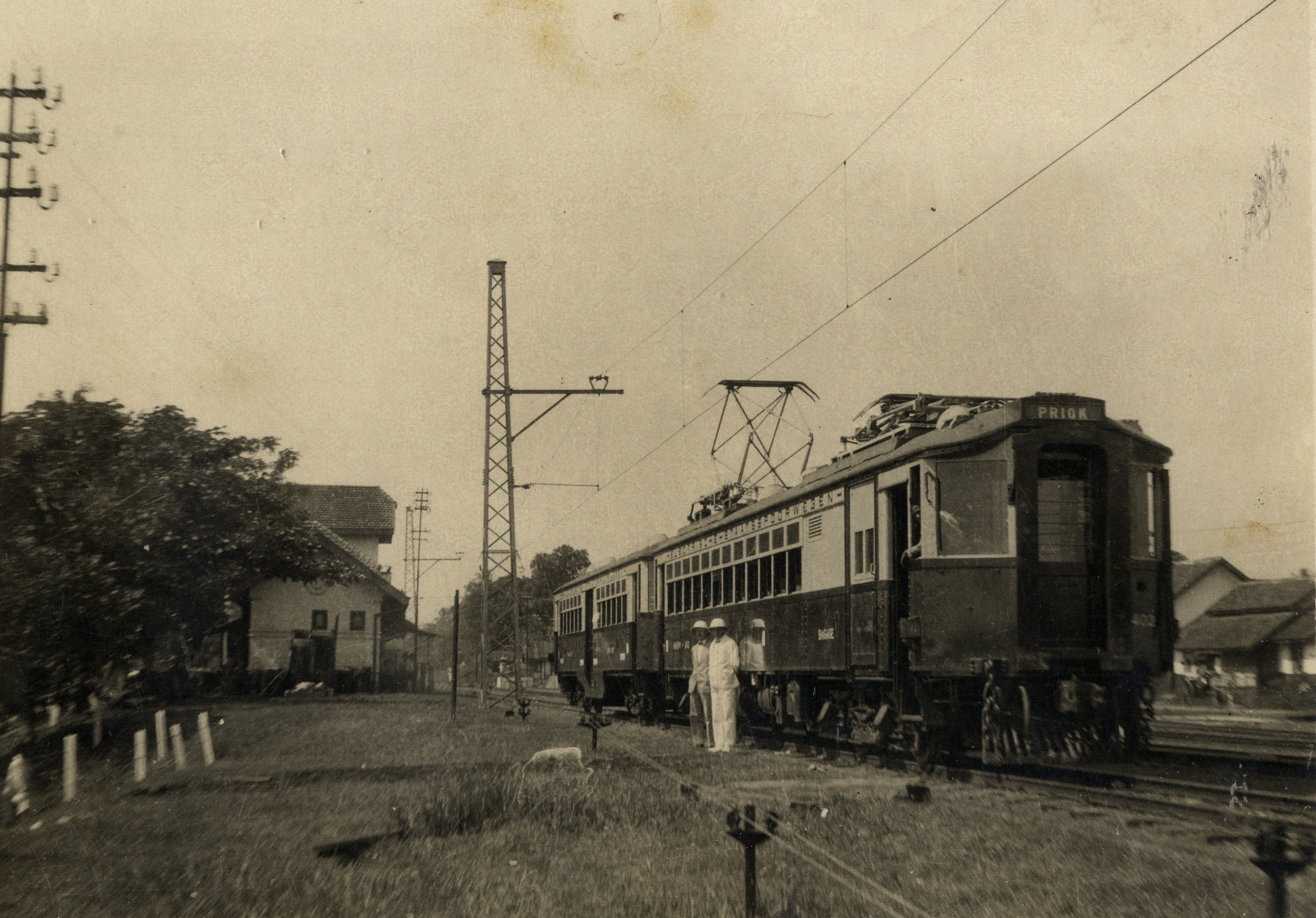
The trainset ESS MABW 400 series and ESS VCW 700 series near Manggarai Station c. 1925

These electric multiple units are divided into several classes, such as the MBCW 100, of which 10 units numbered 101 to 110 were reclassified as the MABW 100 series, 10 units of the MABDW 200 series, numbered 201 to 210; 5 units of the MBDW 300 and 400, which have been reclassified as MABDW 300 and 400; and finally, 25 units of the VCW 700 series, numbered 701 to 725. The classification sequence of these trains consist:
- M = motorrijtuig (Motor Cabin(Mc)/Driving Motor(DM)
- V = volgrijtuig (Trailer Cabin(Tc)/Driving Trailer(DT))
- A = first class
- B = second class
- C = third class
- D = bagage
- W = equipped with Westinghouse air brake system
These trains were equipped with GE-289A traction motors that supplied by General Electric
