= Victorian Railways box vans =

- Manufacturer: Victorian Railways
- Built at: Newport Workshops
- Replaced: Each other
- Operator: Victorian Railways
- Line served: All

Specifications
- Track gauge: 5 ft 3 in (1,600 mm); 4 ft 8 1/2 in (1,435 mm) standard gauge for large bogie vans

The Victorian Railways used a variety of boxcars or covered goods wagons for the transport of all manner of goods. This page covers the history and development of the various classes, and how they changed through their lives.

== H (1857) wooden box van ==
Introduced as early as 1857, when the Victorian Railways took over the defunct Geelong and Melbourne railway company, the most common type of boxvan used by the Victorian Railways was known as the H van. From then to 1897 roughly 1,000 wagons were constructed. When an H van was not available or if the load was too tall to fit inside the wagon, the alternative was to obtain an open wagon and fit a tarpaulin over the top.

Officially the class ranged from 1 through 966, but during the early years the Victorian Railways would regularly scrap a wagon and build a new one with the same number.

The initial design was for a 17 ft 8 in (5.38 m), four-wheel underframe with a body of about 6 ft 4 in (1.93 m), rising to 7 ft (2.13 m) at the highest part of the roof. The capacity of the vans was up to 896 cubic feet (25.37 m^{3}) or 7 long tons (7.1 t; 7.8 short tons), whichever was reached first. Later designs were slightly different; most wagons had the same weight capacity, although length and height of wagons often changed; at least one wagon wasn't even fitted with a roof.

From 1900, the vans started to be withdrawn from general service, instead shifting to maintenance or recovery work. A number were outfitted with tool kits and equipment, then used at locomotive depots. Otherwise, the H type vans were largely withdrawn as a class by 1909. The earlier vans had been replaced one-for-one with steel I-type open wagons; other wagons had been dedicated to maintenance or repair work. This was roughly when the "H" code stopped meaning box vans, instead becoming synonymous with departmental vehicles.

In about 1915, a handful of wagons were fitted with platforms on the roofs, and used to form an overhead wiring train for contractors working on the Melbourne electrification project. After the project was completed the overhead train was retained for overhead maintenance work.

A small number of vans had been fitted with replacement underframes by the 1970s.

== S (1880) bogie boxvan ==
In 1880, twenty boxvans were built by Harkness & Co. for the Victorian Railways. The class given was S and numbers 1 through 20.

The vans were for general traffic; 11 ft (3.35 m) tall, about 7 1/2 ft (2.29 m) across (wide) and just under 32 ft (9.75 m) over buffers for an internal capacity of 1,375.35 cubic feet (38.946 m^{3}). Each van had a single pair of doors in the centre.

By 1886, S 16 was in use for milk transport. In 1889 a further two wagons, 18 and 20, were modified with the addition of shelving and steel bins, to allow for transport of 16 long tons (16.3 t; 17.9 short tons) of raspberries. No.11 is also marked as having increased capacity, but not listed under the raspberries section. In any case, it is thought that the raspberry wagons had returned to normal traffic - but maintained their increased capacity - by 1900.

About half the class were written off the main register in 1891. These vans were recycled as "Casualty trucks", a predecessor to the later H van uses. In particular, vans 6, 11 and 13 are marked as being in use at Spencer St (now Southern Cross), Flinders St / Princes Bridge, and Ballarat. However even with this new use the vans did not last much longer, being replaced with conversions from the OO class of open wagons in 1912. All vans were scrapped by 1913.

== B (1957) steel boxvan ==
As the H type wagons were withdrawn, more goods was transported by the alternative method of open wagons fitted with tarpaulins. However, by the mid-1950s this method had become unduly expensive, as tarpaulins were prone to regular damage from weather and improper staff handling practices, as well as simply wearing out. It was decided to recycle old steel underframes, using components from and a similar design to the then-new bogie boxvans, to create a new fleet of four-wheeled, all-steel boxvans.

The first van entered service on 10 December 1957; the underframe had been recycled from open wagon I 15168, constructed in 1924. This van was slightly different from later releases, having flat sheet ends instead of the later pressed steel ridges, which were added for strength.

The original order was made out for 500 wagons of the type; however between branch line closures due to traffic transferring to road (as result of ex-WWII vehicles becoming available to the general public) and the cost-cutting at the end of Operation Phoenix, the order was progressively cut back; first to 400 wagons, then to 350 wagons. However extra components were still available at the time of the final cutback, so the class eventually reached 380 members; the last delivered in 1961. The change of plan is clear when looking at the registers; the wagons from 1 to 350 recycled old I type underframes, while the majority of the 351-380 range had re-used underframes only a few years old, from the KF flat wagon class.

The wagons had a capacity of 14 long tons (14.2 t; 15.7 short tons), or 1,500 cubic feet (42 m^{3}).

By the early 1980s, most were being scrapped with some in use as service vans for the Way and Works Branch. In later years bodies started to be placed at Train Examiner depots as work sheds.

== BH (S.A.R. M type) Boxvan (1925) ==
In 1925, the Victorian Railways was paying close attention to W.A. Webb's transformation of the South Australian Railways, with the introduction of new locomotives and rolling stock and general upgrades across the board.

One of the developments was the introduction of new, all-steel, larger bogie wagons for goods trains. These were of various types - boxvans, open wagons and so on. The VR took advantage of the opportunity to save on costs through economies of scale, and made a point of purchasing wagons identical to the SAR types. As a trial, around 1929 the VR hired a number of SAR wagons, including boxvans these were M 7005 and 7372. While on the VR system the wagons were temporarily recoded BH It is possible that this code might have been perpetuated if further units had been purchased by the VR.

By the early 1930s, the two wagons had been returned to the SAR.

== BB, BA, TT Medium Bogie Timber Boxvan (1957) ==
From late 1957, the last of the then-remaining TT insulated bogie vans were relettered to either BB for general use, or HH for breakdown train use. The fleet, previously with 31 vehicles, was renumbered from 1 to 21 to account for vehicles scrapped or otherwise converted since 1889.

=== BA reclassing ===
A further ten BB wagons were scrapped between 1959 and 1961, and the remaining vehicles reclassed to BA with the number group 1-5 and 7–12. It seems BA6 was intended to have been renumbered from BB15, but that vehicle was scrapped in December 1961, before it could receive the new identity.

=== Disposal ===
All wagons were scrapped by 1965, but the underframes of some were recycled - BA8, BA3 and BB2's frames became flat wagons HD230 for the fire attack train, and QD1 and QD2 for a construction train. A further three wagons were used to create HR bogie transports, for Y class locomotive bogie transfers during construction of the standard gauge from Wodonga to Melbourne.

== Medium Bogie Steel Boxvans ==
=== BB/BP era ===
==== BB/BP (1958) ====
In 1958, designs were finalised for a new fleet of boxvans with pressed steel sides, resembling an extended version of the 1957 four-wheel B van type. The new wagons had four sliding doors fitted, one on each corner, and were constructed from 1958 to 1959.

The first wagon built was number 22, following directly on from the older timber fleet. Wagons were constructed starting at BP22, running through to BP102. On the same day as BP102, BP3 entered service, followed by BP4 through BP21, the last to be delivered. At the time, BP1 and 2, of the older type, were still in service.

BP22's first use in passenger service was on a train to Warrnambool on 3 June 1958.

The 100 wagons were built over about a year, and they entered service as either the BB or BP classes depending on the available bogies. BB wagons eventually included 22–29, 39, 41, 43–46, 49, 52 and 57–60. By late 1959 the entire fleet had been upgraded and reclassed as BP, except BB29 and BB45 which were altered in early 1960.

In 1961-1962 the capacity of the BP, BMX and BMF series of wagons was uprated from 33 to 35 imperial tons.

BP98 spent some time in 1961–1963 on the standard gauge, painted in blue with gold stripes and fitted with a generator for head-end power provision. A video of the vehicle in service is available online, timestamp 2:31 to 2:44 It was returned to broad gauge with the generator removed by November 1964.

As of 30 June 1967, 13 BB, 44 BMF, 27 BMX and 17 BP wagons were in service. Three years later, on 30 June 1970, the 44 BMF and five of the BP vans had been converted to BMX for a total of 76, while the 13 BB and 12 remaining BP vans remained in use. These 12 BP vans were numbers 3, 4, 6, 8, 11, 20, 27, 54, 56, 64, 66 and 97.

==== BB/BF22 (1959) ====
The last wagon to be constructed was the second BB22, and it had a different door layout installed. Instead of doors on all four corners, this wagon had all four doors at one end of the body, with the other end sealed. This was a trial design allowing for loading from a shorter platform and carriage of wider loads, but the design required a deeper, stronger underframe at the door end to compensate for the extended body opening. This wagon was classed as the second BB22 (shortly after the classleader had been converted to BP). The design was later used for BLF/BLX and VLF/VLX wagons.

The wagon was relettered BF22 in 1961, then became BMF1 a few months later. It was the only wagon in the series to never be classed BP.

==== BB (1960) ====
From 1960, a shortage of high-speed bogies saw a number of BP wagons downgraded back to BB. Wagons 77, 70, 10, 85, 14, 51, 71, 19, 9 and 67 were renumbered BB222 to 231. In 1961–62, these became BMF 2 through 11.

==== BB (1963) ====
A further need for high-speed bogies in 1963 saw wagons BP 37, 41, 47, 52, 65, 68, 73, 74, 81, 86, 89-92 and 96 downrated to BB, but they retained their numbers.

BB73 was relettered as BMF73 fairly quickly, but the remainder were held to 1974. Then most returned to the BP classification with same numbers, while three were converted to BMX with new numbers (47 to 76, 65 to 77 and 86 to 78).

=== BMF/BMX/BP era (1961 to 1979) ===
==== BMF class ====
Starting with BF22 to BMF1 in 1961, wagons began to be fitted with aligned bogies in 1961. This allowed operation at up to 60 miles per hour, against 50 mph for the diamond-frame bogies fitted to BB and 70 mph for the bogies fitted to the BP. The wagons fitted with aligned bogies were coded BMF, to indicate "medium" size distinct from the "long" wagons outlined below.

BMF 2-11 were ex the 1960 batch of BB's, 222–231, all in 1961, and additional wagons were converted from BP between 1962 and 1965, with the final fleet being BMF 1–17, 21–38, 44–46, 48–49, 53, 58, 63, 72–73, 75, 98, 100 and 102.

A total of 49 BMF wagons were in service by 1965. Of those, 20 had retained their original BP numbers, more or less at random.

==== BMX class ====
From 1965, instead of converting wagons to BMF, BB/BP wagons were instead upgraded to BMX. This code signified fitting of ride control and other features required for operation on the standard gauge network, and these wagons could have bogies switched fairly quickly between gauges.

Most of the first 34 wagons were converted from BP between 1965 and 1968; in 1969 the remaining BMF series was absorbed into the BMX fleet. The final number series was 1-75, 98, 100 and 102, for a total of 78 class members.

==== Disposal of the last BB's ====
In 1974, the remaining 15 BB wagons were converted. Most had their passenger bogies returned, adding 37, 41, 52, 68, 74, 81, 89-92 and 96 to the fleet, for a total of 23 wagons. Three others, 76, 77 and 78, were converted to BMX.

==== Return to BMF ====
In 1978, BP4 was converted to BMX. Then, in 1978-79 about half of the BMX wagons were reclassed back to BMF and fitted with aligned bogies, making them non-suitable for bogie exchange. This was largely in response to the perception that gauge-convertible wagons were being borrowed for extensive periods by the New South Wales railways, and only being returned when due for maintenance. It may also have been done to account for the last dregs of the non-bogie stock being withdrawn.

The wagons reclassed were 3, 7–9, 11, 18–19, 24–26, 28–30, 35, 38, 40, 43–44, 48–49, 52–53, 57–58, 60–61, 63, 66–67, 69, 72–73, 75-76 and 102.

=== 1979 recoding ===
Between 1979 and 1981, the Victorian Railways fleet of bogie wagons was reclassed in line with the then-new Australian standards. All wagons kept their BMF/BMX/BP numbers. Generally speaking, BMF became VBAY, and BMX became VBAX, indicating Victorian, Boxvan, 1st variant and either fixed or gauge convertible, and BP became VBPY indicating Passenger use.

Immediately after first recoding, there were 40 VBAX, 39 VBAY, 22 VBPY in service. VBAY52 switched to VBAX after a few months, during the middle of the process.

A few other wagons were reclassed within the three VBxx codes over the next decade or so, but the fleet generally stayed the same size.

In 1981, VBPY6 was reclassed to VBAY79, the next number available in the VBAY/VBAX series because the rampant renumbering up to 1965 had removed its original slot in the series.

From late 1982 to early 1983, eight VBAY wagons (72, 7, 76, 44, 60, 22, 67, 30 and 43) were reclassed to VBPY 112-120 and added to the passenger fleet.

In 1988, it was realised that the code "VBAY" was actually incorrect, and that the code should always have been VBAF. Wagons 15 and 63 were recoded, but none of the others because the vans in general were not required any more, so they were instead withdrawn and scrapped.

During the scrapping process, a number of underframes from the surplus VBAY/VBAX wagons were modified to become VZTX sleeper transport wagons. It is not clear how many were used and when, because pencilled-in entries in the rolling stock registers overlap. It is known, for example, that the identities of VZTX 2, 3, 5 and 7 were each used at least twice.

=== D, DH, DN and D^{T} Parcel Vans (1983-1986) ===
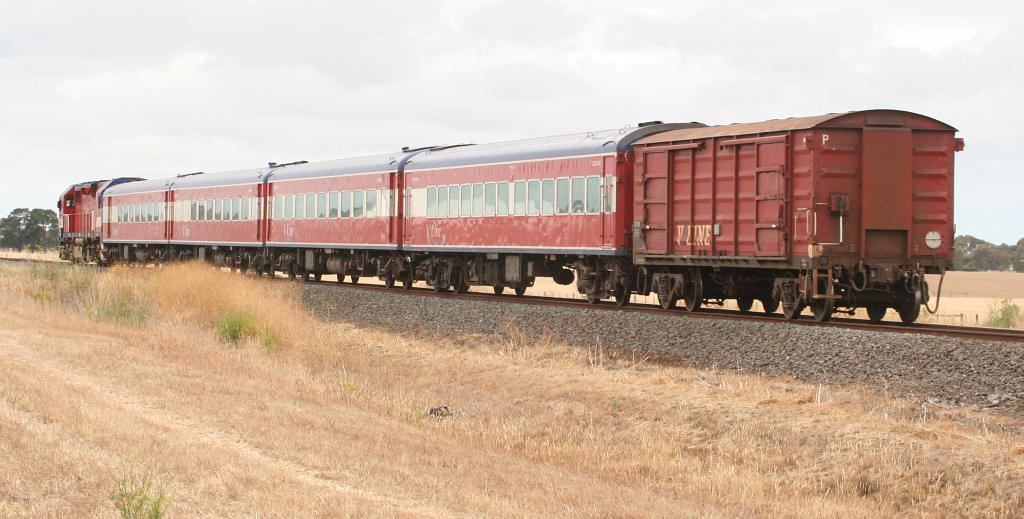
D^{T} van trailing a V/Line service

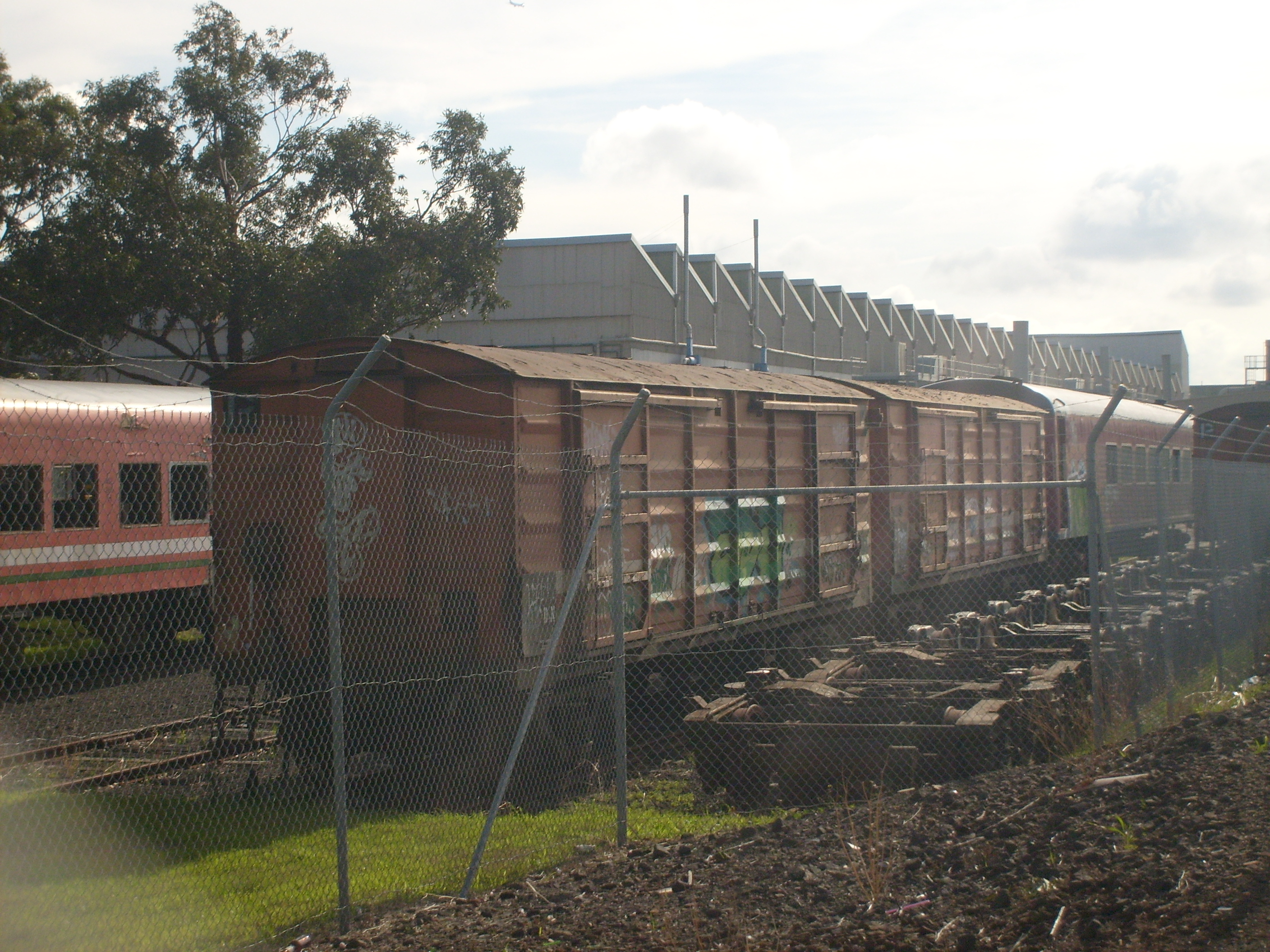
The two D^{N} vans at Newport Workshops

Three of the VBPY cars, 37, 56 and 90, were repainted into the teacup scheme, orange with two silver stripes. Shortly after, these and most of the rest of the VBPY fleet were reclassed as D parcels vans, and counted as part of the passenger fleet for accounting and rostering purposes. On reclassing, the wagons were repainted initially into the VicRail "teacup" scheme of orange with black underframe and two silver stripes; but no "teacup" logo was applied. From 1983 wagons had the new V/LINE logo applied to the body sides. At least one wagon, D329, was painted orange and black with white and green stripes, but no logo.

Over the period 1983 to 1985, D vans 301 to 321 were converted from the VBPY fleet, except VBPY6 which became VBAY79. These were quickly followed by D322-330 ex VBAX/VBAY wagons, and then VBPY112-120 were converted to D vans 331, 333–335, 337 and 339; though VBPY113, 117 and 119 became DH401, 402 and 403 instead. The slots D332, 336, 338 were never filled. D340 to D350 were converted from VBAY/VBAX, though shortly afterwards D350 (ex VBAY25) was converted to DH404. Finally, in 1986, the last serviceable VBAX wagons became D351-361. Notably, the majority of the D vans started on BX-type bogies; 351 onwards were fitted with Super Series bogies on conversion, and the previous units were upgraded at some point after November 1988.

Some vans were fitted with Flettner rotating vents along the roofline, recovered from Harris carriages then being scrapped. One such example was D335, another was D355.

The DH class were fitted with through cables for head-end power, so that P or N class locomotives could power the onboard airconditioning and lighting for carriages without having to shift the van to the far end of the train at each end of the trip. All the D vans were eventually fitted with the same Through-cabling, and had a letter T applied somewhere on their identity plates; in some cases this presents as part of the class, i.e. DT3xx or 3xxDT, other times the T is inserted between the class and number in superscript. Technically, the "T" is not a part of the wagon identity, just an instruction to staff. The first sighting of the DT code was DT331 on 22 August 1990, although D318 and D347 had also been reported as modified with through cables.

As of 30 June 1984, V/Line had 46 D/DH vans in their fleet, increasing to 50 by 30 June 1985, and 61 from 30 June 1987 to 30 June 1991. The additional vans were constructed as part of V/Line's Fast Track parcels service, which was expanded in the mid 1980s with a 40/40/20 split across freight trains, road delivery and passenger trains.

Two were withdrawn in the year to 30 June 1992, another 17 the following year, 30 more to 30 June 1994, and four more to 30 June 1995 leaving only eight in service with V/Line Passenger.

On 17 April 1987, vans D301-305, 308-315, 317-318, 320-321, 324-326, 329, 331, 334-335, 339-341, 348, 351-361 were recorded as painted in V/Line's then-new orange livery with white and green stripes.

As of November 1994, 33 vans had been consigned to Bendigo Workshops for disposal - numbers 301, 303–308, 311, 316, 323, 326–328, 334, 337, 343–349, 351–352, 354–357, 359–361, 401 and 402. In late 1994, DH402 was scrapped at Bendigo Workshops, followed closely by DH401 in early 1995. This left two vans - D320 and D329 - in service on the metropolitan network, D318 allocated to 707 Operations and D321 allocated to the South Gippsland Tourist Railway, the seven vans sold to West Coast Railway (309, 314, 315, 319, 325, 333 and 340), D341 owned by V/Line but stored at Newport Workshops from July 1995, and eight vans in service with V/Line Passenger, numbers 302, 322, 324, 335, 339, 341, 358, 403 and 404. Of those, 302 was outshopped in the new red livery on 25 November 1994, 322 on 5 December and 324 on 22 December 1994.

The entity V/Line was split into Freight and Passenger divisions in the mid-late 1990s, and the Freight business was sold to Freight Victoria, later Freight Australia, in early January 1999. The contract for that sale included D vans 351–357, 359-361 inclusive, though all of those are listed above as having been forwarded to Bendigo for scrapping years earlier.

==== Greaser Train (1995-1997) ====
In 1995, vans D320 and D329 were handed over to the metropolitan division, and each fitted with screw couplers and buffers at one end to transition between Harris cars 794M and 797M, and Tait inspection car 1447M which had previously been sandwiched between two regular Tait motor cars. This was for the Greaser train, used for applying lubrication to the overhead wiring systems. When the Comeng and Hitachi fleet became the exclusive vehicles for the electrified network (following withdrawal of the Harris and electric locomotives), there was no longer a need to apply grease - the newer pantographs included a graphite contact strip which auto-lubricated the overhead. These vans, among others, are now stored at Newport Workshops in Centre Block.

==== West Coast Railway (1993-2003) ====
A new rail operator, West Coast Railway, took over services on the Warrnambool route in 1993. They purchased a range of older locomotives and rollingstock from V/Line, including D vans 309, 314, 315, 318, 319, 325, 333 and 340. Only D314, D315 and D319 were repainted for West Coast Railway service. Otherwise, the main difference between the West Coast fleet and others, was a large flat plate fitted over the ends between the two vertical beams.

Van 314 was marked DT 314 and 315 as DT 315, the latter with white on a blue number plate rather than the normal white on black. DT319 was marked in the top-right corners, and had a door replaced with a different stair layout.

314 and 315 are currently on the ground at Warrnambool, while 325 and 333 are privately owned in Neerim South.

==== V/Line Passenger (1995-current) ====
In 1995, a new livery was introduced for V/line's Passenger operations. In lieu of the orange with white, green and grey, rollingstock was painted in all-over red with a black underframe and blue roof. This livery was applied to a handful of wagons retained by V/Line Passenger for use on their services; 302, 322, 324, 335 and 339. Generally speaking, the code layout was replicated from the orange days; 302^{T}D, 322^{T}D, DT 324, D^{T}335, and DT 339

In 1999, vans DH403 and 404 were reclassed DN. Sometime after April 2000, vans DN403 and DN404 were transferred to Newport Workshops and stabled in the far-south-east corner, adjacent to North Williamstown station. After being stored there for nearly a decade, DN404 was removed from storage and rebuilt as power van PH454.

The "V/LINE" logo was updated in 2000 to a flowing, italicised "V/Line", and the new logo was applied only to D335.

In December 2010, vans 302, 324 and 335 were transferred to Newport Workshops for long-term storage.

In 2015, van 339 was refurbished at Southern Shorthaul Railroad's Bendigo workshops, and it re-entered service in August that year. It and D322 are still used on occasion, but for the most part they are stored at Bank Sidings, just north of Southern Cross Station. Both vans are still in the post-1995 red livery with capital letters for the V/LINE logo.

==== Other operators and preservation ====
When V/Line was split into Passenger and Freight companies in 1995, some wagons went to each. When V/Line Freight was subsequently onsold to RailAmerica, that purchase included D vans 351-357 and 359–361, along with VZTX wagons 13–20.

Otherwise, a handful of wagons were sold either into private ownership or to preservation organisations.

When West Coast Railway wound up in 2004, the vans were distributed, and D319 spent time in private ownership. It was handed over to Seymour Rail Heritage Centre around 2007, painted in Victorian Railways blue and fitted with a generator set (similar to its predecessor BP98) for use on heritage trains radiating from Seymour. Its first run in the new scheme was the last run of the broad gauge Spirit of Progress from Melbourne to Albury, though it did not have the gold stripes applied as the repainting had only been completed the previous night.

707 Operations obtained D317, now in storage at Newport Workshops, and D318 which ended up with 707 Operations in a livery similar to the R Class locomotive tender.

The Australian Railway Historical Society claimed D340, and this van was stored at the Newport paint shop with markings indicating its future. To date, it has not been placed on display in the museum due to a severe lack of space.

Steamrail Victoria obtained D341. As of 2009, it was marked with large white crosses indicating that it was due to be scrapped in the Rotten Road purge in that year, undertaken to make way for additional Metro Trains Melbourne sidings. However, the van was salvaged and is now the southernmost vehicle stabled on the new Rotten Road.

Van BP97 was allocated to the South Gippsland Railway until 2016, and it is now allocated to the Yarra Valley Railway.

By 18 March 2025, D vans 302, 322, 324, 335, 339 and DN403 were officially removed from the V/Line rolling stock register.

== Large Bogie Steel Boxvans ==
=== BB/BF/BLF/BLX (1961), later VBBX/VBBY/VBBF ===
From late 1961, a fleet of large steel boxvans were built. The new vans were classed BB and numbered 23 to 118, directly following on from the ex-TT converts and BF22, the last vehicle in the Medium series.

The new large vans were constructed very much like the soon-to-be-constructed VLF/X louvre vans, with curved roofs. The main difference was the pressed sheet-metal sides, rather than louvred sections. The vans were fitted with plain-bearing bogies.

As roller-bearing bogies became available, the vans were reclassed as BF in 1961/62. The first was BF119 in October 1961, and wagons 35, 41, 45, 54, 57, 75, 85, 88, 93 and 105 were also converted and reclassed to suit.

The class changed to BLF, with the L for 'Large', by early 1962. Vans released after BF 119 were all classed as BLF from the beginning. The final fleet was BLF 23 to 151, for a total of 129 vehicles.

Between 1963 and 1965, the fleet was altered again with grade control and other equipment added to make them gauge-convertible, for use on the new standard gauge line to Sydney. The upgraded wagons were classed BLX, retaining same numbers.

=== BLF Cement wagons ===
In 1967, a small section of the fleet was separated out from the rest. 24 wagons, numbers 121 to 144, were reclassed back to BLF and used exclusively for palletised cement traffic from Fyansford to Melbourne and some country depots. All vans had stencils on the left end to indicate the restricted use, and the change from BLX to BLF was to ensure they did not end up back on the standard gauge system.

=== BLX Cheese wagon ===
Apparently, BLX120 was modified for cheese traffic, but details of the changes, if any, are not clear.

=== 1979 recoding ===
In the 1979 recoding, the BLX wagons became VBBX, while the BLF cement wagons were relettered to VBBY, later VBBF.

Wagon BLX113 was relettered as VBAX113 accidentally, and ran in service for a nearly a year until the error was corrected. The recoding took place in April 1979, and the incorrect code was still in place in late October.

The class was placed into storage from 1990, with scrappings starting in 1991. The VBBF wagons stayed in service for perhaps another year.

Many of the wagons were removed from service at Bendigo workshops, with the bodies sold to locals for private use. Many can still be seen on farms in country Victoria today.

==== Preservation ====
Van VBBX23 was allocated to the South Gippsland Railway until 2016; in 2017 it was reallocated to the Yarra Valley Railway.

Other preserved vehicles are VBBX 48, 59, 74 and 95.

== MS vans (1963) ==
Despite the addition of the B vans to the goods fleet, bringing the total to around 24,000 vehicles, it seems the decision to cut back on the delivery of B vans may have been short-sighted.

In 1963, it was decided to take a leaf from the book of the engineers from the 1930s, when a number of M cattle wagons were converted to MU-type louvre vans. This time around, 89 cattle wagons were converted, picked completely randomly. Numbers were retained with the code altered to MS, and the gaps between planks were covered with internal tarpaulins. The wagons were then used for bagged superphosphate (fertiliser) traffic, loaded and unloaded by hand.

Three of the wagons had been converted back to M, replaced by other M to MS conversions in 1965.

By 1970, the MS trucks were either being scrapped or returned to normal cattle traffic. The last to return to M was number 139, in mid-1971.

== BFW (1977) large bogie boxvan for car parts (later VBCW) ==
In the mid-1970s there was a policy in place on the VR to eliminate as much as possible of the straggling four-wheel rolling stock then in use.

One of the major traffics employing four-wheel wagons at the time was the shuttle service between Geelong and Campbellfield (Somerton), for the transfer of palletised car parts between the Ford plant in Geelong, and the car assembly plant just north of Upfield railway station. At the time, the four-wheeled wagons ran in block of up to 30 wagons at a time. Trains would run from Geelong to Newport then via Brooklyn to Sunshine, up to Broadmeadows via the Albion-Jacana freight line, and then shunt and reverse at what was then Somerton, now renamed Roxburgh Park station. Occasionally the train would not be able to get a direct schedule between Newport and Broadmeadows; on these occasions the train ran to either Melbourne Yard (or failing that, even Caulfield) to reverse before heading back.

The replacement for the four-wheeled wagons, released in 1977, was the BFW boxvan. This new class of 40 wagons was massive by Victorian standards, with a length over coupler faces of more than 23 1/2 metres (77 ft) and an internal capacity of 165 cubic metres (5,800 cu ft). Eventually 40 members of the class were delivered; the train changed from 30-odd four-wheeled wagons to only ten boxvans, although the overall length was about the same.

The vans were fitted with the same low-level aligned bogies as the FCW class of flat wagon (previously FCF); wagons within the W bogie class could be bogie-exchanged, but only within that group which indicated a low-level design to accommodate the taller loads. The lower underframe also necessitated gooseneck-type couplers, designed to lift the coupler head high enough to match the couplers on other rolling stock. The horizontal center line of the coupler shank, or shaft, and of the draw gear are lower than that of the coupler head.

In 1979, the class was recoded VBCW.

The train stopped running in the late 1980s, as traffic shifted to road transport. Experiments were conducted in using the vans for general freight traffic, but even then there were too many vans available for not enough freight. By the mid-1990s, the vans were in storage and by 1996, most had been cut for scrap with underframe sections salvaged to repair other stock.

== VBFX three-compartment van (1996) ==
In 1996, louvre wagon VLEX949 was modified in Swan Hill by Grizzly Engineering. The sides were removed and two internal bulkheads were added, with the now three compartments made accessible with three pairs of external bi-folding doors. The new wagon, VBFX1, was painted into V/Line Freight colours. The new van was not used regularly, and by August 2000 the body had been removed and the underframe converted to flat wagon VFTX 28.

A second conversion by Grizzly Engineering (VBFX 2) was commenced but never completed. That wagon, previously VLEX1039, was used to create VFTX 39 by September 2000.

== Explosives transportation ==
=== Broad gauge (P vans) ===
Starting from 1855, a fleet of four-wheeled vans were designed for the transportation of explosive powders and compounds, as these were needed for construction and mining among other activities. With a wooden body and underframe and a capacity of five long tons (5.1 t; 5.6 short tons) each, the first five vans were constructed in iron by Joseph Wright & Sons at the Satley Works in Birmingham, England and delivered to Melbourne. The vans were created for the Geelong & Melbourne Railway. The GMR had plans and documents outlining the vans' construction, and when delivered they were stencilled as "POWDER VAN No.1" through No.5.

When the GMR wound up the five vans were transferred to the Victorian Railways, and the VR's rollingstock register erroneously records the wagons as being constructed in 1862 - the date of transfer from GMR to VR. The Victorian Railways classed the five as PV 1 to 5, and these were the only vehicles in the VR fleet available for explosives transportation until 1872–73 at which point more wagons were constructed by Rawlings in 1873. They were given numbers 6 to 11.

A further expansion to the fleet came in 1882 when the Victorian Railways built van PV 12 at their own Williamstown Workshops. This design proved successful, as in 1884 another twelve wagons were constructed by Pickles & Co., with an identical design to PV 12 and built at the same location. These were the last vans to be built without Westinghouse brakes, and the entire fleet was modified in 1910–1912 to match the new safety standards, along with other modifications. While the original vans were classed PV, the fleet is referred to simply as the P class from 1886 onwards.

In 1910, van P 10 had its underframe replaced with iron most likely as a trial. Then, from 1911 to 1921, vans 6, 7, 8, 9, 11, 14, 17, 21 and 23 were scrapped, with parts recycled to construct new wagons with the same numbers and purpose at the Newport Workshops. The new wagons had Westinghouse brakes from the start, and it is probable that these vans resembled 12 through 23 although records do exist of another design.

From 1900 and for about half a century after, explosives were also transported from Deer Park to Laverton; at Laverton the contents of the explosives vans were transferred by a 2 ft (610 mm)-gauge tramway over to Trugannina Reserve for storage, then transportation to ships via smaller vessels. This complex procedure was necessary as explosive compounds were not allowed to come within a mile of Melbourne's main port.

The first proper scrappings (without recycling) occurred in 1928, with another seven scrapped up to 1944. In 1948, wagons 1, 2, 3, 4 and 20 were stored at Tottenham Yard, with the entire remaining fleet save P 5 scrapped/recycled in 1953–54. P 5 was instead converted to van H 17 in 1950 (for departmental use) and by 1960 it had been sold to Yarragon.

From 1954, a new fleet of P explosives wagons was constructed. These were very different from their predecessors in appearance, and were the first vans to break the trend of a five-long-ton (5.1 t; 5.6-short-ton) limit, with capacity for 10 long tons (10.2 t; 11.2 short tons) or 15,000 pounds (6,800 kg) of explosive material. Like some of their predecessors, at least some wagons were constructed with recycled underframes and body frames, all metal, but with new plywood sides. The vans had automatic couplers and Westinghouse brakes from new, as was the standard at the time. Vans 1 through 25 were built in 1954–55, and the fleet was almost doubled in 1958–59 with the final van, P 45 (although it is thought that vans P 46 to P 51 were also constructed at this time, reliable records have not been found). The entire fleet was painted a bright red (different from the then-new Passenger Red) with a large yellow area declaring the explosive contents on all sides, and this made the wagons stand out in a train of brown wagons.

Some wagons had their centre side-sills strengthened in the mid-1960s. In 1979-81 the surviving wagons had their load limits were altered from 15,000 lb (6,800 kg) to 7,500 kg (16,500 lb) in line with the metrification of the Victorian Railways, and around the same time signs were added relating to the allowed contents of the vans and safe handling of same. The fleet lasted intact through to the late mid-late 1970s, with scrappings, withdrawals and sales mostly occurring in the early 1980s although no records exist for about half the fleet.

Today, vans P 8, 22 and 43 exist at the Victorian Goldfields Railway although only no.22 is operational. Also, the bodies of vans 5, 13 and 30 are used by the Puffing Billy Preservation Society for storage at Emerald, while up to five other vans may exist on private property at Ballarat, Bendigo, Leongatha, Yarraville and Williamstown.

=== Narrow gauge (^{N}PH vans) ===
In 1910, the VR built 1NPH for the Walhalla line. 1NPH was built with 2 compartments for the carrying of Explosives and general goods and had an internal wall. However, by the time the Walhalla line was completed the Gold rush had mostly ended rendering 1NPH redundant. in the later half of 1910 1NPH was reclassed as 1NH, And in 1911, it was altered with the removal of the internal wall and replacement of the sold steel sheeted doors to the louvered doors. it then transferred to the Whitfield line where it remained until taken off Reg with the close of the line.

It has since been rescued and fully restored to static condition. but could be made run able with a reconditioned set of bogies.

== Liveries ==
In general, box vans have been painted in Victorian Railways Wagon Red livery. From the 1960s onwards, this was amended with varying sizes of VR symbol on each side depending on the timeframe, generall larger logos earlier on.
