= Victorian Railways iced vans =

- Manufacturer: Victorian Railways
- Built at: Newport Workshops
- Replaced: Each other
- Operator: Victorian Railways
- Line served: All

Specifications
- Track gauge: 5 ft 3 in (1,600 mm)

The Victorian Railways used a variety of air-cooled and iced wagons or refrigerated vans for the transport of all manner of goods. This page covers the history and development of the various classes, and how they changed through their lives.

== T/TH vans ==
For the transportation of milk, meat and other products that needed to be kept cold, in 1881 the Victorian Railways developed a small fleet of boxvans with a similar design to the H type boxvans. At least 19 were built by 1886, although records are incomplete. More wagons may have been constructed, but wagons which had been scrapped or converted by 1886 were not included in that year's register.

In 1887 four vans, numbers 6, 7, 8 and 16, were fitted with long bars inside the roof, for the purpose of hanging meat while being transported. Around the same time, a note in the rollingstock registers indicates that vans 14 and 15 were fitted with "side springs", although it is not known what this meant.

With the introduction of the new, upgraded type of insulated T vans for 1894, these vans were recoded to TH.

Most vans had been fitted only with a Westinghouse train pipe, not the full brake apparatus, between 1889 and 1892. The full brake equipment was not installed until the 1909-1910 period. From 1910 to 1923 the class was progressively withdrawn, with the last, TH 11, scrapped on 20 December 1923.

== TT vans ==
As four-wheeled wagons were not always sufficient to handle the large amount of traffic needed, a fleet of bogie box vans with thick insulation was also developed. Initially, refrigeration was achieved by having slots in the sides and ends of the wagons, allowing airflow when the train was moving. This was the design used for the thirty-one TT class vans built between 1889 and 1891. The first wagon of this class had three single-doors per side and was used exclusively for milk traffic, while wagons 2 through 31 had two sets of double doors per side. The last of these, no.31, was modified in 1891 for fish traffic. All vans carried roughly 20 long tons (20.3 t; 22.4 short tons) of goods, and the code TT was probably selected as at the time there were a handful of T four-wheeled box vans fitted with meat-carrying facilities (see above under T/TH), and at the VR at the time used double-codes to indicate bogies.

In 1939 vans 14 and 17 were damaged in a derailment. The bodies were scrapped, but the underframes were used on R 11, an overhead maintenance van, and Q 27, a Pintsch Gas transport wagon.

In the late 1920s vans 15, 16 and 18 began use as Mail baggage vehicles with their capacity downrated to 15 long tons (15.2 t; 16.8 short tons) each. From 1941 they gained high-speed bogies for express train running, and in 1956 15 and 18 were recoded to TP, then to BP only a year later (TT 16 went on to become a BB van). That is why the steel vans BP above run from 3 to 102. Van BP1 was painted blue (and presumably with gold stripes) by 7 September 1958. The two vans were scrapped in November 1960.

Between the mid-1930s and late 1950s, about half the remaining TT vans were recoded to BB, then BA classes for general goods, while the remainder went on to HH duty as breakdown or loco vans at places like Ararat, Benalla, Maryborough, Jolimont, Newport, North Melbourne and Traralgon.

Vans 2, 3 and 12 also stand out; van 2 became a BB, then a crane crawler wagon QD, then a sleeper discharge wagon VZCA. Van 3 had a similar life, although it spent some time as a BA wagon between the BB and QD stages. Finally, van 12 became a BB, BA, then HD wagon despite that code normally being reserved for four-wheeled wagons, and finally it became VZAA, a fire attack wagon.

A highly successful experiment was made yesterday by the Mutual Store Company, under the direction of Messrs. Stevens and Kelt, with one of the recently constructed refrigerating railway cars. The company has lately undertaken to supply several of the lines of mail steamers with fresh meat and poultry, and in order to deliver the articles in the best possible condition has arranged with the Railway Commissioners for the use of refrigerating cars, from which the meat can be readily passed into the steamers' refrigerating chambers. Accordingly, yesterday morning, at the Spencer street station, 6 tons (6.1 t; 6.7 short tons) of beef, mutton, pork, lamb, veal, poultry, and game were loaded into one of the large trucks, which has a carrying capacity of 20 tons (20.3 t; 22.4 short tons). This consignment was intended for provisioning the P. and O. mail steamer Valetta, now lying at Williamstown, preparing for the homeward voyage. The meat had previously been kept in a temperature of 34 deg (1.1 °C), freezing point not being desirable for ships' stores, although necessary for cargo. The cooling of the car had been commenced on the previous day, when, in one hour, it was reduced by 14 deg (7.8 °C), and in another five hours, by 4.30 p m, the temperature was lessened to 45 deg (4.4 °C). At 8 o'clock yesterday morning, the thermometer showed 40 deg (7.2 °C). This was the temperature of not only the inside air, but of the walls of the car. A ton and a quarter (1.3 t; 1.4 short tons) of ice was used, and it will probably last a week. Mr. R. H. Francis, traffic manager, paid several visits while the loading was in progress, and afforded every facility. The car was attached to the 10.40 a.m. goods train, and ranged up alongside the Valetta at the Williamstown railway pier by 11 o'clock, when transfer of the contents into the ships refrigerating room was commenced. Mr. Stevens, who has had a long and varied experience of the chilled meat trade, made a careful examination when the car was opened, and found everything satisfactory, the low temperature having been retained, and even during the operation of removal, with the double doors of the truck wide open, there was a fall of only 6 deg (3.3 °C).

— The Argus, Friday, 24 October 1890

== T Vans ==
Not long after the construction of the last TT van, a four-wheel van with a similar purpose was constructed. These were lettered T, and the wagons already existing and called T were relettered to TH to make way for the new class.

The first vans were weighed twelve long tons (12.2 t; 13.4 short tons), and were intended to have a mansard-style roof. However, this was altered to the constant-radius design before construction began. The vans were kept cool by their insulation, as well as a 2-foot-1-inch (635 mm) deep well suspended from the roof of the wagon, which was filled with salted, crushed ice at Melbourne Yard on a regular basis (What a Journey - Tom Yates). 191 vans were constructed of this type. The vans were painted in standard VR wagon red, but their roofs were in a lighter brown; this was probably to make them stand out in consists when being viewed from above.

Wagons 20-34 utilised coconut fibres in the floor; 35-40 Luplan's carbo paint, and 41-48 zinc-white paint, all likely experiments attempting to improve the wagons' retention of cooler temperatures.

Starting from October 1909, the design was changed to a fifteen-long-ton (15.2 t; 16.8-short-ton) design with three axles, but otherwise construction was identical and continued up to wagon number 417 in 1924.

Between 1929 and 1934, it is believed that vans 121-191 and 369-392 were converted to the TFM class; the differences being only two ice hatches placed closer to the ends of the wagons, and modifications to allow more meat to be held inside the wagons.

In the mid-1930s, the wagon couplings were switched from hook-and-chain to autocoupler type. When these conversions took place, the six-wheeled vans lost their middle axles and TFM wagons were converted back to standard T design.

By the 1950s the T vans were starting to wear out, so a new fleet of 50 aluminium-constructed vans were added, numbered 420 through 469. These had angled roofs and a capacity of 15 1/2 long tons (15.7 t; 17.4 short tons), with room for up to 8 long tons (8.1 t; 9.0 short tons) of crush ice and walls 6.0625 inches (154 mm) thick, insulated with "Onazate". They were initially noticeable in consists because they not painted above the underframes (which were in VR wagon red), although by the mid-1960s they were painted all over in wagon red. Van 422 was of a different design to the other 49 wagons in this batch, with thinner walls and internal bracing to compensate; this could have been a trial or caused by material shortages. At some point, van 421 had its doors made wider for palletisation, although it is not known whether this was from new or a later modification.

Other wagons of note are T 13 and 36 which were destroyed in a fire at the Government Cool Stores in 1937, T 6, which became wagon H1 for way and works fumigation in 1954, Ts 29, 167 and 181 which apparently swapped identities a few times, 20-34 with a coconut fibre floor, 35-40 with Luplan's Carbo Paint from new and 41-48 which were painted in Zinc White when new, T 103 which became a workmans' sleeper in 1957, Ts 140 and 143 which swapped identities in 1960, HD 217 and 222 which were converted to HD 238 and HD 239 respectively, T 304 which was converted to flat wagon K2 in 1978, HR 5 in 1980 and HZE 231 in 1985 and T 444 and 463 which had their floors modified for palletised butter traffic in February 1971.

As the Victorian Railways lost its hold on the freight market the use of the vans declined, and by the mid-1970s many had been sold or scrapped with 79 underframes converted to KMQ flat wagons for container use. The class was essentially gone by the mid-1980s, with T 329 and T 378 the last to be marked Off Register in 1990.

=== TP vans ===
In 1958 two wagons, T 297 and 283, had passenger bogies added and were renumbered to TP 1 and 2, for express running from Melbourne to Mildura on the "fruity"; they were joined by TP3 in the following year, formerly T393. In 1967 two more vans, TP4 and TP5, were converted from T381 and T356, but these retained the single compartment design with double doors rather than being split into three compartments each. Vincent has hypothesised that the bogies used were recycled from UP type louvre vans, which were then being converted from passenger speed to freight speed UB vans.

Train crews at the time refused to allow the wagons to operate in the middle of consists, fearing that the short wheelbase would cause derailments, so the vans were fitted with taildiscs and lamp brackets and permitted to operate behind the guard's van.

As at 1967, individual TP vans were regularly being attached behind the CE van of the Sunday night down passenger train from Melbourne to Mildura; in the reverse direction the other TP trailed the CE van, along with a BP, VP or BMF van. From 1 May 1967 the vans were being attached to both the Fruit Flyer and the overnight sleeping trains. TP4 was first sighted around June 1967; by the time TP5 entered service the overnight service was not loading enough perishable goods to make the vans' inclusion worth the effort, so all vans were reallocated to the Fruit Flyer services instead.

Despite being new conversions from the same vehicle types to the same vehicle types, when entering service TP4 was recorded with a tare weight of 19 LT 17 cwt 2 qtr (20.19 t), while TP5 was slightly heavier at 19 LT 19 cwt 1 qtr (20.28 t); a difference of about 7 qtr (200 lb; 89 kg).

In the late 1970s the vans were fitted with "FOOD TRANSPORT ONLY" signs as health regulations required. They were generally painted in Victorian Railways' passenger red, but near the end some were repainted to wagon brown.

The vans were intended to become the VRPY class in the 1979 recoding and this was printed in the Working Time Tables of the era, but the recode was never applied in practice.

In March 1978 the TP vans were withdrawn from the "Fruity" and replaced with refrigerated containers on flat wagons. Then, in March 1985, two louvre vans, VLCX399D and VLCX351Y, were stencilled "Ballarat - Mildura Traffic Only" and were fitted with marker light brackets and tail discs at each end, to enable their use as trailing vehicles. The vans could be detached or attached at Ballarat without the need for a full air brake examination. TP2 was withdrawn in May 1979. TP3 was withdrawn in February 1981 and scrapped four months later, with the body sold and transported to Bass. TP1 was marked off register in May 1982, followed by TP4 in February 1985 and TP5 in May 1984.

== Narrow Gauge ==
In 1899 the Victorian Railways built a 1 off Narrow Gauge Insulated Van, 1NTT. It entered service painted white on the Gembrook Line, in 1905 it was repainted Red like other freight wagons of the period, with the opening of the extension of the Beech Forest line to Crowes it transferred to Colac for transporting meat from Crowes. In 1926 with VR goods rolling stock reclassification it was reclassed to 1NT. In the 1950s it ended its VR service career on the Whitfield Line. It is now stored at Puffing Billy awaiting a full restoration.

== Liveries ==
When they first entered service, the iced wagon fleet was painted white with black text and underframe, and silver roofs. This helped to keep the wagons cool but it was difficult to keep them clean, so from around 1910 the livery changed to the standard wagon red (though the roof was painted in a tan scheme, to help identify iced wagon roof hatches from above). The five TP wagons fitted with passenger bogies were painted in Passenger Red.
