= Eli H. Janney =

American mechanical engineer (1831–1912)

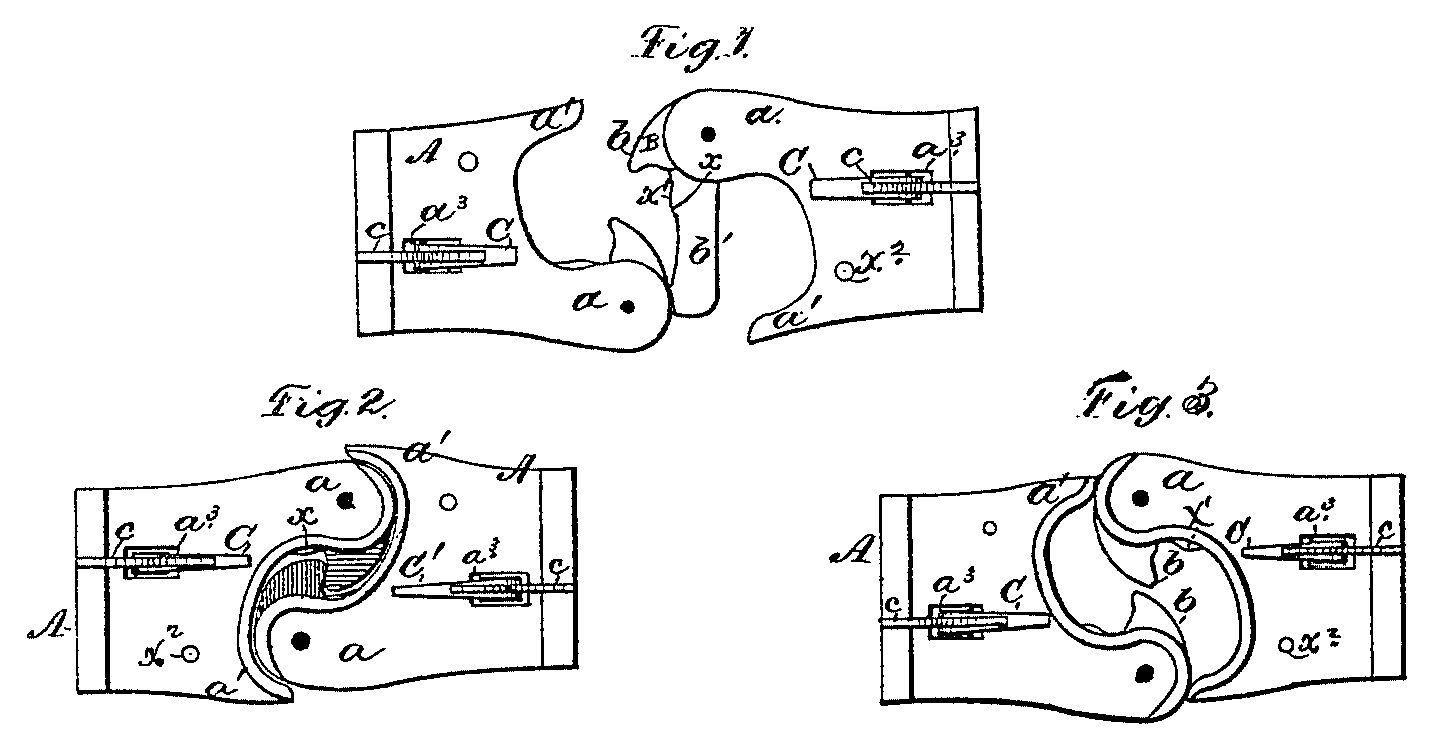
Diagram of the top view of Janney's coupler design as published in his patent application in 1873.

Eli Hamilton Janney (November 12, 1831 – June 16, 1912) was an American inventor, most notably he was the inventor of the modern knuckle coupler that replaced link and pin couplers on North American railroads.

== Biography ==
He was born in 1831 to Daniel Janney and Elizabeth Avis Haines in Loudoun County, Virginia. He studied briefly at a seminary. He married Cornelia Hamilton (1833–1889).

In the American Civil War, Janney achieved the rank of major for the Confederate States of America, and served on the staff of General Robert E. Lee.

After the war, he was a dry goods clerk in Alexandria, Virginia; he spent many of his lunches whittling his concept out of a block of wood for a replacement to the railroads' link and pin couplers that were in wide use. On April 1, 1873, Janney filed for a patent titled "Improvement in Car-Couplings" describing the knuckle-style couplers that are in use on railroads today. He was awarded U.S. patent 138,405 on April 29, 1873.

He died on June 16, 1912, in Alexandria, Virginia and was buried in Ivy Hill Cemetery. The City of Alexandria named one of their streets in his honor, Janney's Lane.

Janney's coupler and the Westinghouse air brake are generally regarded as being the two most significant safety inventions in U.S. railroads between the end of the Civil War and 1900.

== Patents awarded ==
- U.S. patent 77,046 Improved Car Coupling, April 21, 1868
- U.S. patent 138,405 Improvement in Car-Couplings April 29, 1873
- U.S. patent 156,024 Improvement in Car-Couplings October 20, 1874
- U.S. patent 207,183 Improvement in Car-Platforms August 20, 1878
- U.S. patent 207,525 Improvement in Car-Coupling Draw-Bars August 27, 1876
- U.S. patent 212,703 Improvement in Car-Couplings February 25, 1879
- U.S. patent 214,043 Improvement in Car-Buffers April 8, 1879
- U.S. patent 215,363 Improvement in Car-Buffers May 13, 1879
- U.S. patent 251,594
- U.S. patent 254,093
- U.S. patent 628,329
- U.S. patent 628,330
- U.S. patent 717,686
- U.S. patent 766,042
- U.S. patent 781,949
- U.S. patent 781,950
- U.S. patent 974,153
- U.S. patent 974,154
- U.S. patent 1,045,091
- U.S. patent 1,095,211
- U.S. patent RE8153
