= Railway coupling conversion =

Change in standard for connecting rail wagons

From time to time, a railway decides that it needs to upgrade its coupling system from one that is proving unsatisfactory, to another that meets future requirements. This can be done gradually, which can create many problems with transitional incompatibilities, or overnight, which requires much planning.

== By region ==
=== Europe ===
The European network has traditionally been formed of many independent national railway networks with buffer and chain used near universally to allow the interchange of rolling stock. The European Union Technical Specifications for Interoperability (TSIs) for high-speed passenger rolling stock mandate the use of Scharfenberg Type 10-compatible couplings. The Type 10 includes "horns" to aid coupling on curves and include a function to provide standardised automatic air-brake connections; the coupling horn is often visible poking out at the front of the nose of high-speed trains.

For European freight, the TSIs mandate buffer and chain couplings at specified heights. The European system links to the former Soviet Russian-gauge network, where SA3 automatic couplers are used. Some research has been undertaken to choose an automatic freight coupler compatible with the Soviet one, but owing to widescale replacement cost, no action has been taken to implement the conversion, except for some trial installations. In many heavy-haul applications, such as for coal and iron ore, either US AAR-type couplers or Soviet SA-3 couplers are used. Conversion is made harder to justify because the existing buffer and chain coupling is almost universal.

Meanwhile, drawgear of new rolling stock is being built at a height suitable for conversion. The proposed European C-AKv freight coupler is compatible with the SA3 coupler but adds integrated air and electrical connections. This standard would need to be revised to allow for the unforeseen development of electronically controlled pneumatic brakes.

In Germany all freight wagon have been built with a UIC automatic coupler option since 1976. This mounting option can be used to deploy the C-Akv coupler when a conversion is implemented. A further advantage in such a scenario is, that the C-Akv coupler can also function like the hook and air connectors for a hook-and-chain coupler, ad long as the vehicle with the C-Akv coupler still has buffers.

=== Soviet Union and successor states ===
Russian Empire and later Soviet Union used buffer and chain couplings, albeit with possibly wider centres for the buffers, until conversion to automatic SA3 couplers. The SA3 coupler was introduced in 1932, based on a British invention from 1916. Some wagons were equipped with SA-3 couplers in the 1930s (they could be coupled with chain coupling), but all cars received automatic couplers in 1957.

=== United States ===
Once Congress passed the Safety Appliance Act in 1893, mandating conversion from the link and pin coupler to the Janney coupler, railroads in the United States had only a few years to implement the change. The railroads in North America, except for mass transit, form one unitary system, and uniformity of couplers is important for smooth interchange of rolling stock.

=== Latin America ===
Railways in Central and South America are fragmented by gauge, geography, and financial and technical heritage. While some systems have adopted the American Janney coupler, others retain the British buffer and hook (buffer and chain) coupler (see above).

=== Japan ===
Japan converted its British-derived buffer and chain couplings to the American Janney coupling over a period of a few days (Note: Honshū, 17 July 1925 and Kyūshū, 20 July 1925.) in the early 1920s, (Note: Except Hokkaido, using Janney coupler from the early 20th century.) after considerable preparation. Today, most (if not all) EMUs including high-speed Shinkansen trains, and some DMUs use the Shibata type coupling system, while locomotive-hauled trains use the Janney coupling and Tightlock coupling system.

=== Indonesia ===
The Norwegian coupling was the most common type of couplers used on the railways of the Dutch East Indies and later Indonesia. Due to the drawbacks of Norwegian couplers, the Indonesian State Railways adopted the Janney couplers starting in 1951. (Note: The D52 class steam locomotive, equipped with Janney couplers, entered service in 1951.) To allow interoperability with the older rolling stock equipped with Norwegian couplers, early Janney couplers would have gap which allowed the use of Norwegian coupler adaptor called "Perdijk" device. The Norwegian couplers disappeared from mainline service in the early 1980s, and nowadays only used by heritage trains. The majority of coupling systems today consisted of Janney couplers, with Shibata and Scharfenberg couplers used on EMUs.

=== Philippines ===
The Manila Tranvía system first adopted the use of British buffers and chain couplers with the acquisition of the Manila Railway Manila class in 1885. After American rolling stock became more common under the Manila Railroad during the late 1920s, Janney couplers were adopted as the standard, and were first adopted on the locally assembled RMC class railcars of 1928. World War II-era and post-war locomotives such as the Manila Railroad 800 class of 1944 only use Janney couplers. Today's Philippine National Railways, which succeeded the Manila Railroad, also uses Janney couplers for all of its rolling stock.

Starting in the 1990s, both Scharfenberg and Shibata couplers are being adopted on electrified rapid transit lines in Metro Manila. The first use of the Scharfenberg coupler was for the Manila MRT Line 3 in 1999. Meanwhile, the first use of the Shibata coupler was for the LRT Line 2. In the future, Shibata couplers are also expected for use on the MRT Line 7, the Metro Manila Subway, and the North–South Commuter Railway (NSCR). The NSCR is so far the only PNR line that will use Shibata couplers, with the future South Long Haul project continuing to use Janney couplers for its rolling stock.

=== Australia ===
Australia, with its breaks of gauge, has always had different couplers on different systems, and has generally adopted gradual conversion. Conversion to the Janney coupling is now virtually complete. Commonwealth Railways started with Janney couplings on its 1,435 mm (4 ft 8 1/2 in) standard gauge Trans-Australian line, and some railways, like the former Victorian Railways and the Queensland Railways, used dual couplers. Older couplers remain on Heritage railways.

=== Middle East ===
While the Middle East is mostly standard gauge, three different couplings appear to be in use (not counting Scharfenberg couplings on EMU trains). These are buffer-and-chain, American, and Russian types.

=== Africa ===
South of the Sahara, Janney (AAR) and chopper couplings (not necessarily of compatible types) appear to account for most couplings. The preferred and proposed UAR standard is the American Janney (AAR) coupling.

== See also ==
- Railway coupling by country
