= Dual coupling =

Type of railway coupler able to couple to two different types of couplers

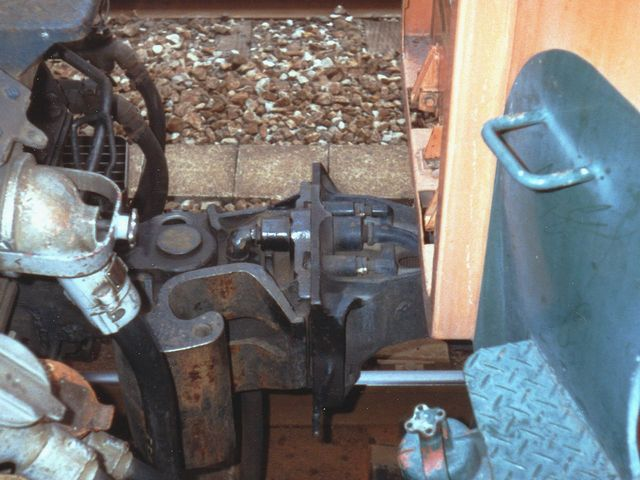
Combined Janney and Shibata couplers on a JNR Class EF63 locomotive (left) connected to a 115 series EMU (right). The dual couplers are mounted to a pivot, allowing both to swing.

Different types of railroad rolling stock have different couplers depending on the purpose and type of equipment being used and its intended destination. European rolling stock tend to use buffers and chain couplers while American rolling stock uses a Janney coupler or "knuckle coupler". These are incompatible with each other, but where some railroads have obtained older, less expensive used rolling stock from different countries or regions, instead of having to standardize on one form of coupler, it may be useful to be able to use either type of coupler on a piece of rolling stock without having to remove anything.

It is possible to mount both buffers and chain and knuckle couplers on the same car, provided that the knuckle can swing out of the way. Alternatively, either a lug to hold the chain is cast in the body of the coupler or a chain is mounted on top of the coupler. This is also done with an SA3 coupler built by SAB WABCO.

Locomotives and some freight cars of the Indian Railways are fitted with a 'transition coupler' that incorporates a screw coupling within a knuckle coupler: the knuckle coupler remains in position and does not swing away when not in use. The screw coupling is mounted on a hinge on the opposite side of the knuckle coupler. Most Indian freight cars use the knuckle coupler alone, without buffers, whereas passenger coaches almost exclusively use screw couplers and buffers. Exceptions are the new LHB coaches imported from Europe, and a few other makes of carriages converted to use knuckle couplers.

Some Russian locomotives and wagons have buffers together with the central coupler. When coupling to Finnish equipment, a short chain with a block that fits in the central coupler is placed on the Russian side, backing up and compressing the buffers so that the chain can be laid on the hook. (That is also the common way of coupling locomotives to or from wagons, faster than unscrewing the link.)

British locomotive-hauled passenger carriages adopted a dual coupling system in the 1950s. They have retractable buffers and a central Buckeye automatic knuckle coupler that lowers to reveal a hook for a screw-type chain coupling. When in use, a pin through the buckeye shank rests in the conventional hook. No chain is provided on dual-coupled vehicles, since the chain on the other vehicle can be used when the knuckle coupler is out of the way (down). Inter-stock coupling was with the automatic coupler (with the buffers retracted), while connection to the locomotive was with the buffer-and-chain system with a screw coupler. Today this dual coupling system has been adopted for all loco-hauled passenger trains in Great Britain to allow faster shunting operations.

== Gallery ==
Indian and British dual couplings with buffers

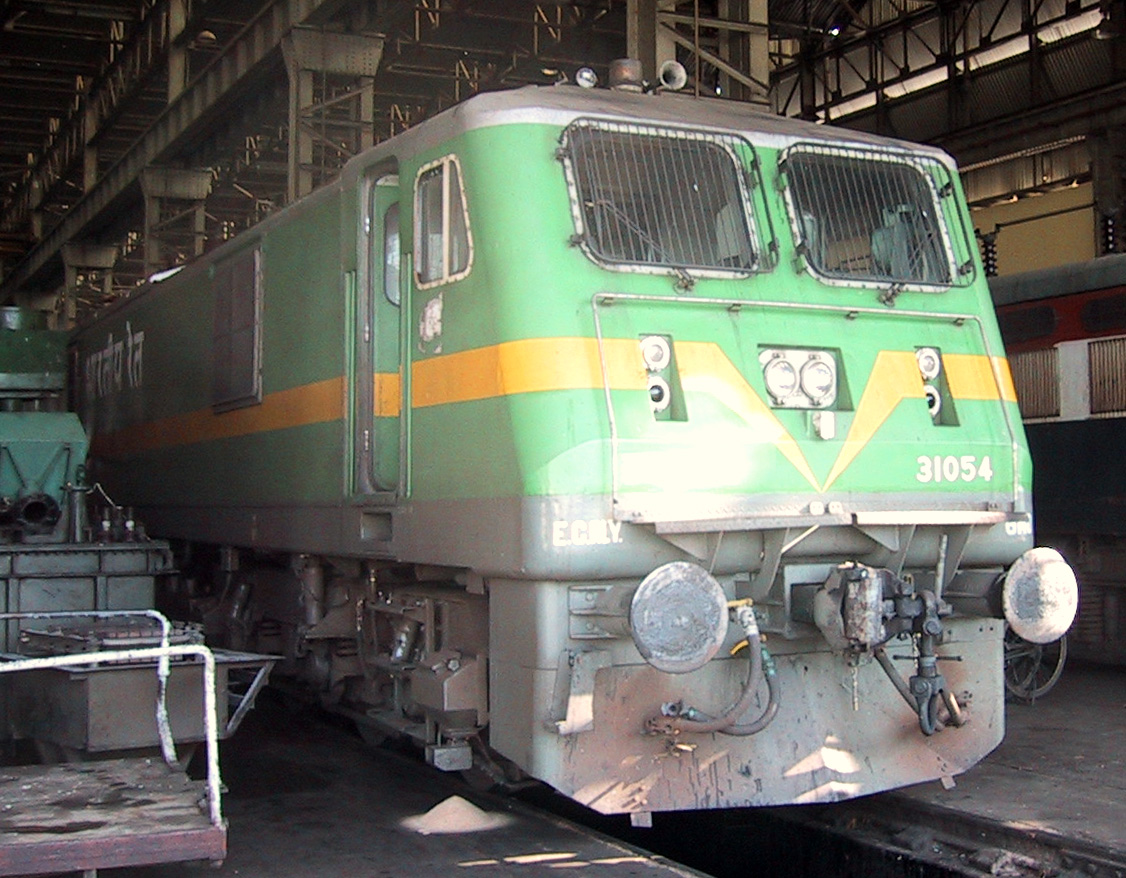
Dual coupling on a modern locomotive. (Indian locomotive class WAG-9) The chain is mounted on a hinge on the right of the AAR coupler

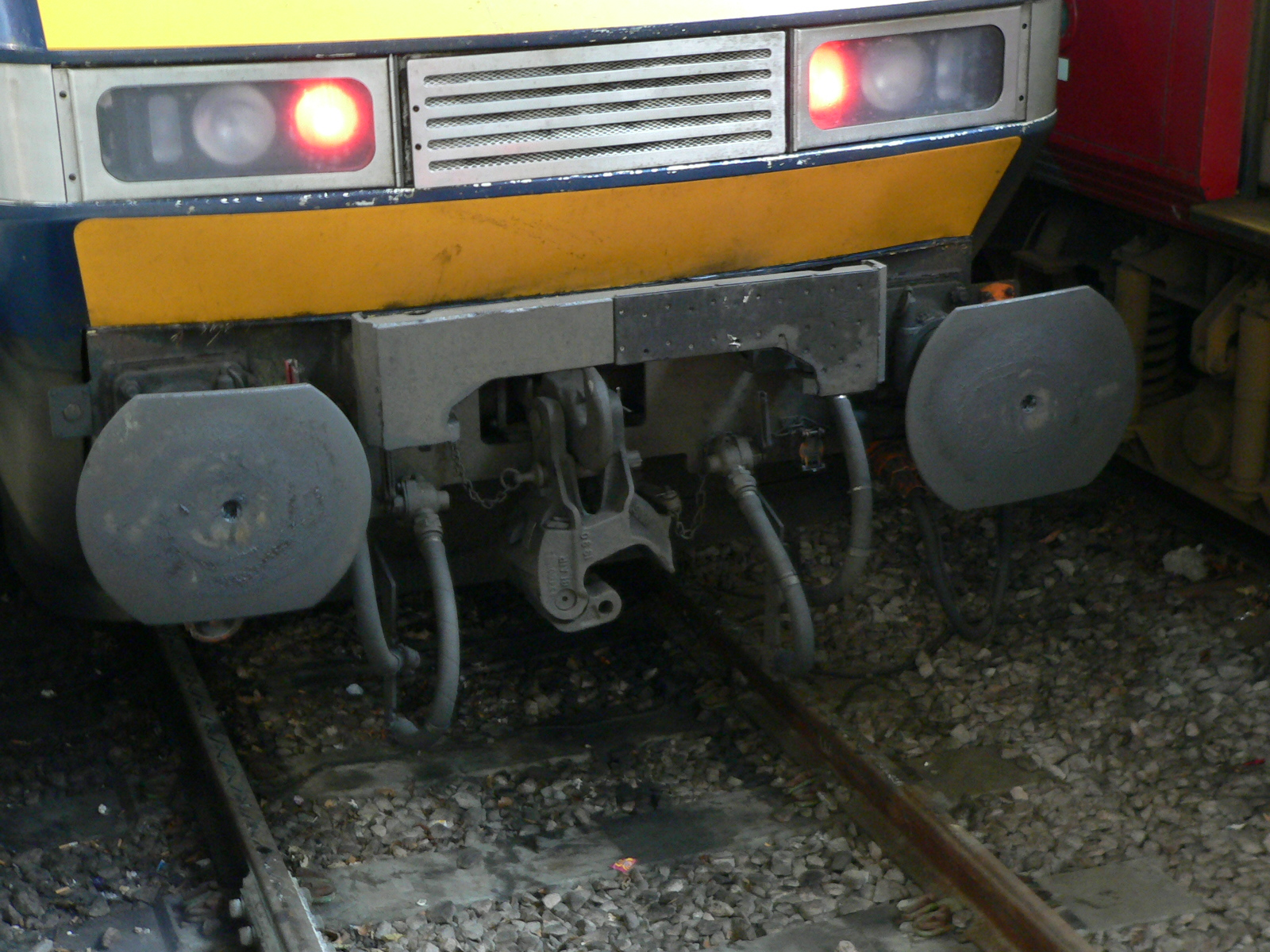
British-style dual buffer-and-chain/semi automatic coupler with knuckle swung out of the way (drop head)

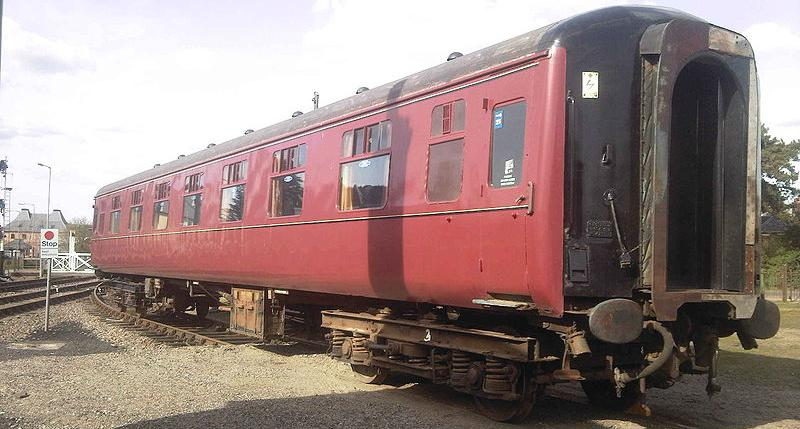
Prototype Mark 2 13252 fitted with dual buffer-and-chain/janney coupler at the Mid-Norfolk Railway in April 2009
Dual couplings and adapters

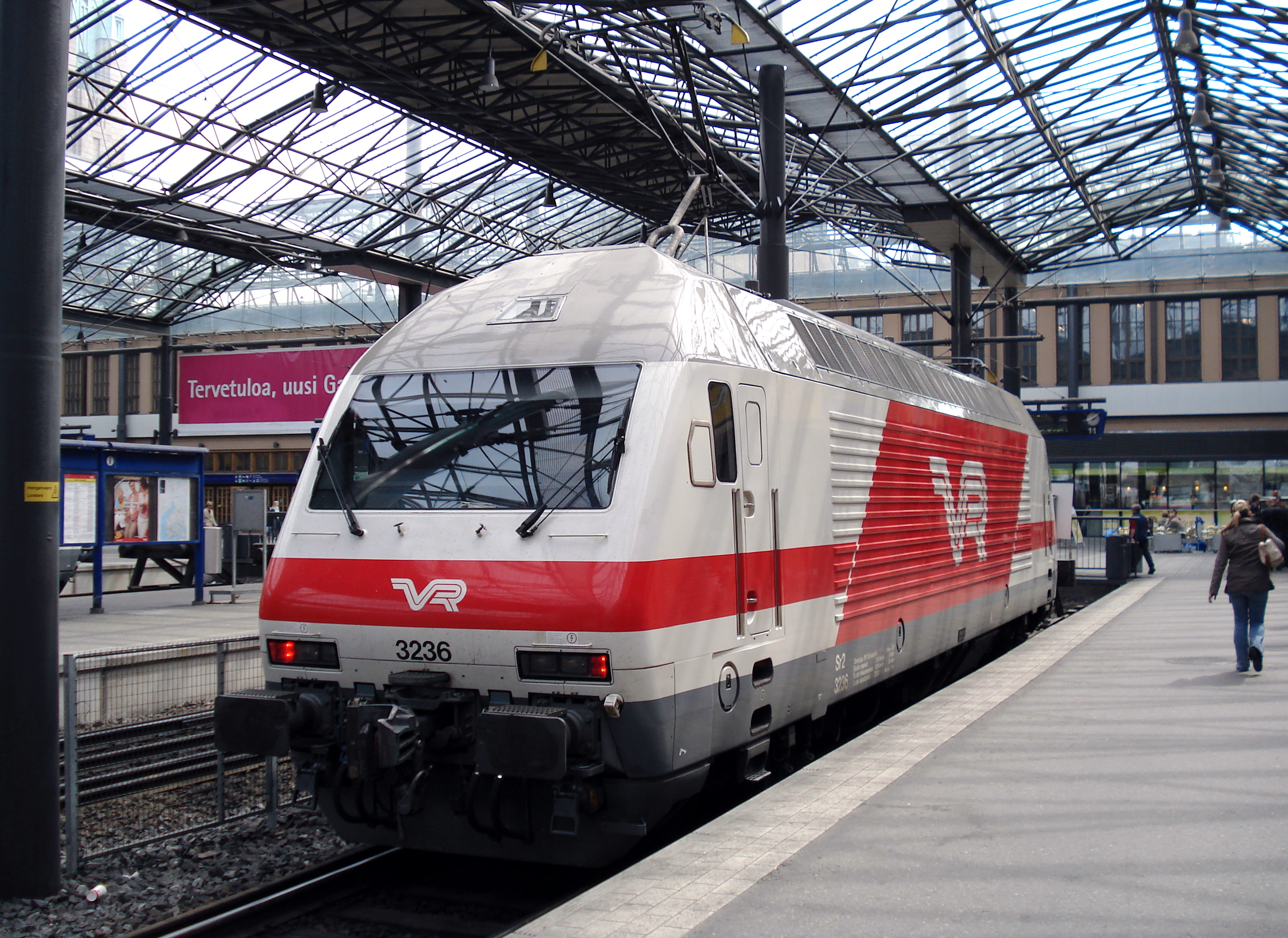
A Finnish locomotive with dual coupling {Unilink coupler)

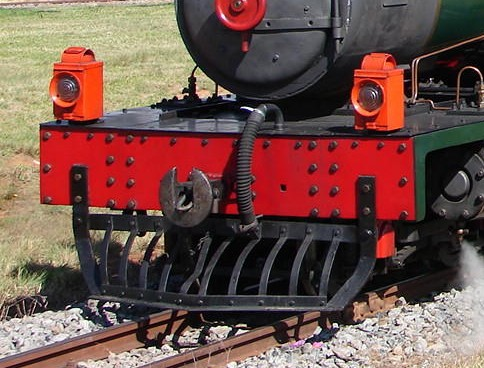
Bell-and-hook coupler with Johnston coupler adapter link

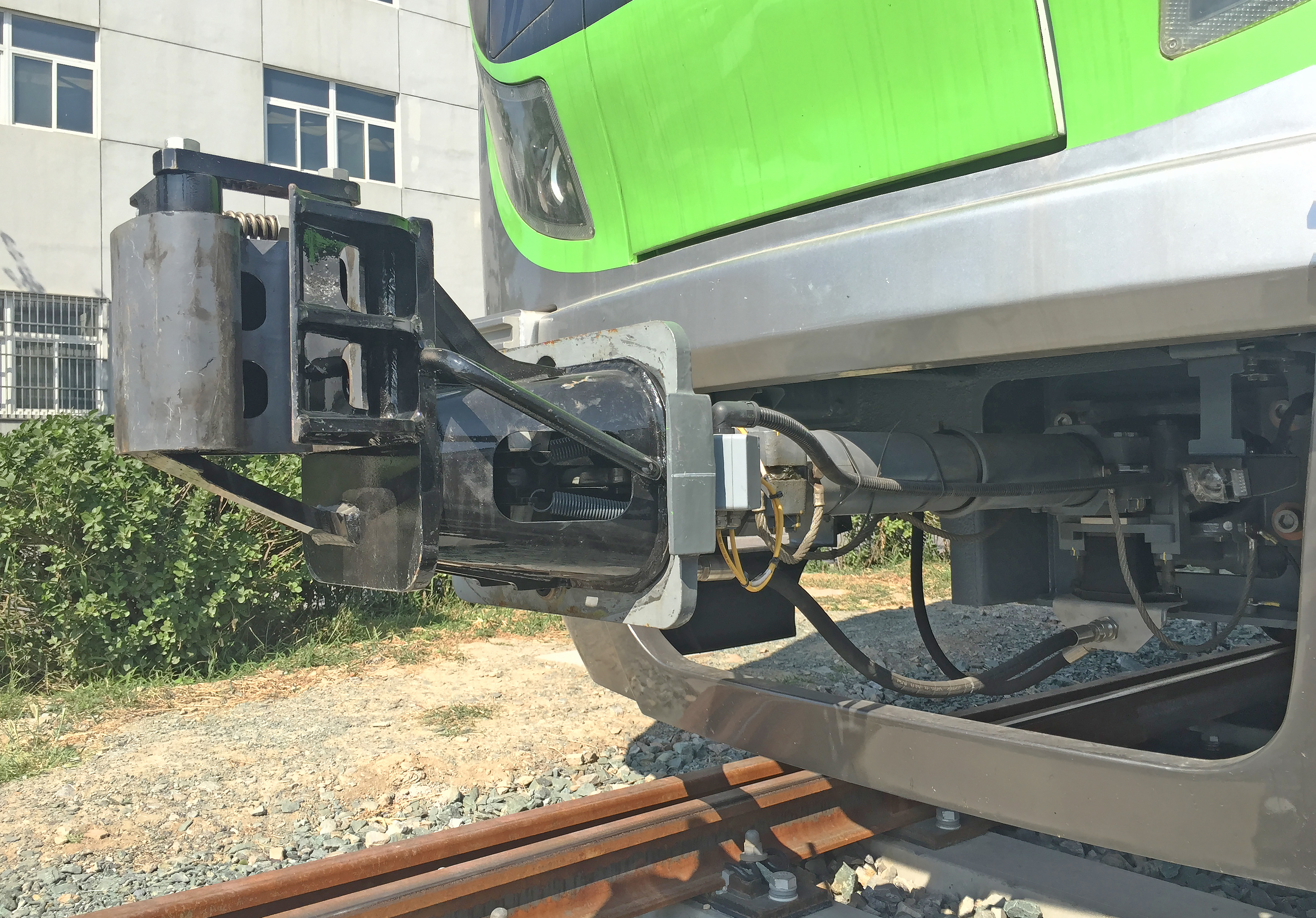
A Janney coupler adapter installed on a Scharfenberg coupler

== See also ==
- Barrier vehicle
- Bell link-and-pin coupler
- Draft gear
- Knuckle coupler
- Railway coupling
- Railway coupling by country
- Railway coupling conversion
- Sets of carriages
- Unilink coupler
