= Meat chopper =

Meat chopper may refer to:

- Cleaver, a large meat knife
- M45 Quadmount, a World War II machine gun mounting
- Meatchopper coupling, a means of coupling railway cars
