= Railway coupling by country =

The railcar couplers or couplings listed, described, and depicted below are used worldwide on legacy and modern railways. Compatible and similar designs are frequently referred to using widely differing make, brand, regional or nick names, which can make describing standard or typical designs confusing. Dimensions and ratings noted in these articles are usually of nominal or typical components and systems, though standards and practices also vary widely with railway, region, and era. Transition between incompatible coupler types may be accomplished using dual couplings, a coupling adapter or a barrier wagon.

== Coupler types ==
- ABC coupler (Automatic Buffing Contact)
- Albert coupler
- Bell-and-hook coupler
- BSI coupler (Bergische Stahl Industrie)
- Buffers and chain coupler, also known as British, buffers and screw, English, EU, link and hook, UIC, or UK coupler
- Center-buffer-and-chain coupler
- Digital automatic coupling (DAC)
- GF coupler
- Henricot coupler
- H2C coupler
- Janney coupler, also known as AAR, APT, ARA, CB, center buffer, knuckle, MCB or tightlock coupler
- Johnston link and pin coupler
- Link and pin coupler
- Miller coupler
- Norwegian coupler, also known as chopper or Jones coupler
- Pin and cup coupler (WABCO N-Type)
- SA-3, also known as SovietAuto-3, AK69e, CA-3, Russian or Willison coupler
- Scharfenberg coupler, also known as Dellner, Schaku or Voith coupler
  - While different Scharfenburg couplers may be mechanically compatible, they may be electrically incompatible.
- Shibata coupler
- Ward coupler
- Wedglock coupler, also known as London or Tube coupler

== Africa ==
=== Algeria ===
- English, Russian couplers on 1,435 mm (4 ft 8 1/2 in) standard gauge track
- English couplers on 1,055 mm (3 ft 5 1/2 in) gauge track

=== Angola ===
- AAR couplers

=== Botswana ===
- AAR couplers

=== Benin ===
- CBC couplers

=== Burkina Faso and Côte d'Ivoire ===
- English couplers

=== Cameroon ===
- Russian couplers (SA3)

=== Congo~Brazzaville ===
- SA3 couplers

=== Democratic Republic of the Congo ===
- AAR couplers

=== Egypt ===
- English couplers on historic stock
- AAR coupler Links on modern stock

=== Eritrea ===
  - CBC couplers

=== Ethiopia ===
- AAR couplers

=== Gabon ===
- Russian couplers

=== Ghana ===
- Norwegian couplers on historic stock
- AAR couplers on modern stock

=== Kenya ===
- AAR and Norwegian couplers on Narrow gauge railways
- AAR Alliance couplers on Standard gauge railways

=== Liberia ===
- AAR couplers

=== Malawi ===
- AAR couplers

=== Mali ===
- like Senegal

=== Mauritania ===
- AAR couplers
- SA3 couplers

=== Morocco ===
- English couplers

=== Mozambique ===
- AAR couplers

=== Nigeria ===
- AAR couplers on modern 1,435 mm (4 ft 8 1/2 in) standard gauge railways
- ABC couplers on legacy 1,067 mm (3 ft 6 in) railways
- ABC couplers on legacy Bauchi Light Railway 762 mm (2 ft 6 in) Narrow gauge railways

=== Senegal ===
- English couplers on freight and passenger stock
- Norwegian couplers on Indian Stock

=== South Africa ===
- Buffers and chain coupler from 1859 to 1873.
- Johnston link-and-pin from 1873 to 1927 on Cape gauge, from 1906 on 2 ft (610 mm) narrow gauge in Natal.
- Bell-and-hook from 1902 on 2 ft (610 mm) narrow gauge in the Cape of Good Hope.
- AAR knuckle wide use from 1927 on Cape gauge. The first application of these couplers in what is now South Africa was in 1904 by the ultra-progressive Central South African Railways (CSAR) on their rolling stock for the "Limited Expresses" between Johannesburg and Pretoria.
- Willison from 1973 on 2 ft (610 mm) narrow gauge in the Cape Province.
- WABCO N-Type from 1984 on 6M EMU rolling stock. Also used on class 8M EMU rolling stock built from 1988.
- Scharfenberg from 2012 on Gautrain, from 2016 on new PRASA EM01 commuter stock.

=== Sudan ===
- AAR couplers

=== Tanzania ===
- Norwegian couplers on 1,000 mm (3 ft 3 3/8 in) metre gauge track
- AAR couplers on 1,067 mm (3 ft 6 in) gauge track
- AAR couplers on 1,435 mm (4 ft 8 1/2 in) standard gauge track.

=== Togo ===
- Center buffer and side chain couplers
- Norwegian couplers on Indian Stock

=== Tunisia ===
- English couplers

=== Uganda ===
- narrow gauge : Norwegian couplers
- standard gauge : AAR couplers.

== Asia ==
=== Bangladesh ===
- AAR couplers on 5 ft 6 in (1,676 mm) Stock
- Norwegian couplers on 1,000 mm (3 ft 3 3/8 in) Stock

=== Cambodia ===
- English couplers on older stock
- AAR couplers on newer stock

=== China ===
- AAR couplers on most passenger and freight stock
- A variation of Shibata couplers between 25T passenger coaches (AAR couplers between Bombardier-built coaches)
- Scharfenberg couplers on high speed (CRH) and subway trains

=== Hong Kong ===
- BSI couplers on ex-MTR passenger units and maintenance stock
- Tightlock couplers on ex-KCR passenger units
- Dellner couplers on light rail stock
- AAR couplers on freight stock

=== India ===
- English couplers on historic stock
- AAR couplers on modern stock
- Norwegian couplers on 1,000 mm (3 ft 3 3/8 in) metre gauge track
- ABC couplers on narrow gauge stock
- Scharfenberg couplers in Suburban EMU and DEMU trains and rapid transit rolling stocks

=== Indonesia ===
- English couplers on 1,435 mm (4 ft 8 1/2 in) standard gauge historic stock of Nederlandsch-Indische Spoorweg Maatschappij (Dutch East Indies Railway Company)
- Norwegian couplers on 1,067 mm (3 ft 6 in) gauge historic stock of The Dutch East Indies National Railway Company and the majority of the Dutch East Indies Private Railway and Tramway Companies
- AAR couplers and Shibata couplers on modern stock
- Scharfenberg couplers for the Jakarta - Bandung high speed rail and Soekarno Hatta Airport skytrain.
- Shibata couplers (based on Scharfenberg couplers) for Jakarta LRT
- Dellner coupler for Greater Jakarta LRT

=== Iran ===
- English couplers, Russian (C-AKv) combo couplers on freight and passenger stock
- Scharfenberg couplers on passenger stock

=== Iraq ===
- English couplers on historic stock
- English, Russian (C-AKv) combo couplers on modern stock

=== Israel ===
- English couplers on freight and passenger stock
- Scharfenberg couplers on passenger stock

=== Japan ===
- English couplers on historic stock
- AAR couplers on locomotives, freight and passenger stock
- Shibata couplers (based on Scharfenberg couplers) on passenger stock

=== North Korea ===
- AAR couplers on standard gauge stock
- Reduced-size Janney couplers (AAR) on narrow gauge stock
- Scharfenberg couplers on Pyongyang Metro stock

=== South Korea ===
- English couplers, link and pin couplers on historic stock
- AAR couplers on modern stock
- Shibata couplers (based on Scharfenberg couplers) on Subways and metro car
- Scharfenberg couplers on KTX and imported light metro car

=== Malaysia ===
- Norwegian couplers on historic stock
- AAR couplers on modern stock
- Scharfenberg couplers on ERL, LRT, MRT and Monorail.

=== Pakistan ===
- English couplers on historic stock
- AAR couplers on modern stock

=== Philippines ===
- English couplers on Manila Railway Company (MRC) rolling stock, as well as historic Manila Railroad (MRR) stock before 1932.
- AAR couplers on MRR stock built after 1928 and on all Philippine National Railways narrow-gauge rolling stock.
  - Type E on historic stock and on the PNR 5000 class.
  - Type F interlocking couplers on upcoming PNR narrow-gauge flatcars.
  - Type H tightlock coupling on most PNR rolling stock starting with the 900 class.
- Link and pin couplers on the Hawaiian Philippine Company of Negros Island. Older Manila Railroad stock also use link and pin alongside English couplers.
- Scharfenberg couplers on the MRT Line 3.
  - Shibata couplers on high-capacity rapid transit lines and on the North–South Commuter Railway.
  - Type 10 on PNR 8800 class passenger trains for the PNR South Long Haul project.

=== Russia ===
- Russian SA3 couplers on domestic stock (with side buffers on passenger coaches)
- English couplers on Euro Stock (exchanged on the border)
- Scharfenberg couplers on some passenger unit trains (Velaro, Desiro) and on all subway systems

=== Singapore ===
- Scharfenberg couplers for the Mass Rapid Transit
- Bergische Stahl Industrie couplers for Bukit Panjang LRT
- Compact tight couplers by Japan Steel Works for Sengkang and Punggol LRT

=== Sri Lanka ===
- Buffers and chain couplers, AAR couplers

=== Taiwan ===
- AAR couplers for TRA rolling stock, including multiple units
- Shibata couplers for THSR
- Tomlinson couplers for heavy-capacity Taipei Metro rolling stock
- Scharfenberg couplers for all other urban transit systems such as Kaohsiung Metro, Taoyuan Airport MRT, Taichung MRT and medium capacity Taipei Metro rolling stock
- Link and pin couplers for Alishan Forest Railway and Taiwan Sugar Railways

=== Thailand ===
- AAR couplers on all SRT rolling stock
- Norwegian couplers on historic stock
- Scharfenberg couplers on mass-transit trains
- Wedglock couplers, Ward couplers on London Underground stock
- Narrow gauge lines use a mixture of couplings.

=== Turkey ===
- English couplers on older stock
- Scharfenberg couplers on passenger stock
- Russian couplers (C-AKv) on newer stock

=== Vietnam ===
- AAR couplers on both 1,000 mm (3 ft 3 3/8 in) metre gauge and 1,435 mm (4 ft 8 1/2 in) standard gauge rolling stock

== Europe ==
=== Austria ===
- English couplers on standard gauge stock
- Scharfenberg couplers on passenger units
- Bosna couplers or Scharfenberg couplers on narrow gauge stock

=== Belgium ===
- GF coupler on most multiple units
- Henricot semi automatic couplers on some EMU's
- English couplers on locomotives, passenger carriages and goods waggons
- Scharfenberg couplers on high speed trains

=== Finland ===
- English couplers (UIC) on passenger cars and most freight cars and on historical locomotives
- Russian SA3 couplers on Russian cars and some heavy-duty freight cars
- "Unilink couplers" (SA3 clone with UIC-style screw link) or "Vapiti" (SA3 clone with movable link arm for English couplers) couplers on the majority of locomotives; compatible with SA3 and English (UIC) center hook
- Scharfenberg couplers (some made by Dellner) on multiple unit passenger stock

=== France ===
- English couplers on freight and passenger stock
- Scharfenberg couplers on passenger stock (multiple units and high speed trains only)
- Russian couplers on ore unit trains

=== Germany ===
- English couplers on freight and passenger stock
- Scharfenberg couplers on passenger stock
- AK69es and C-AKv couplers on unit ore trains
- AK69e and SA3 couplers mixed in trains via Mukran ferry terminal
- Scharfenberg or central buffer couplers on narrow gauge stock

=== Greece ===
- English couplers on freight and passenger stock
- Scharfenberg couplers on passenger stock
- Center buffer and side chains on narrow gauge stock

=== Hungary ===
- English couplers on freight and passenger stock
- Scharfenberg couplers on multiple units (in some cases jointly with side buffers)
- BSI couplers with side buffers on BDVmot electric multiple units
- Link and pin on narrow gauge stock

=== Italy ===
- English couplers on standard gauge stock
- Scharfenberg couplers on some EMU/DMU and FS Class E.464

=== Netherlands ===
- English couplers on freight and passenger stock
- BSI couplers, Scharfenberg couplers on passenger stock
- Russian couplers on ore unit trains

=== Norway ===
- English couplers on freight and passenger stock
- Norwegian couplers on historic stock, narrow gauge only
- Scharfenberg couplers on passenger stock (multiple units)
- Russian SA3 couplers on unit ore trains (Ofoten Line)

=== Poland ===
- English couplers on freight and passenger stock
- Scharfenberg couplers on passenger stock
- Russian couplers on unit ore trains and Russian interchange stock

=== Portugal ===
- English couplers on freight and loco hauled passenger stock
- Scharfenberg couplers on multiple unit passenger stock

=== Romania ===
- English couplers on freight and passenger stock
- Scharfenberg coupler on Siemens Desiro multiple units and some ex-German railbuses
- Link-and-pin couplers on narrow gauge stock

=== Russia ===
- Russian SA3 couplers on domestic stock (with side buffers on passenger coaches)
- English couplers on Euro Stock (exchanged on the border)
- Scharfenberg couplers on some passenger unit trains (Velaro, Desiro) and on all subway systems

=== Spain ===
- English couplers on freight and loco hauled passenger stock
- Scharfenberg couplers on multiple unit passenger stock
- AAR couplers on locomotive hauled stock in narrow gauge
- BSI couplers on multiple unit passenger stock (only in Catalonian Railways: FGC)

=== Sweden ===
- English couplers on freight and passenger stock
- Scharfenberg couplers on passenger stock
- Russian couplers on iron ore trains (Iron Ore Line)
- Variant of Norwegian couplers on historic (museum) narrow-gauge stock

=== Switzerland ===
- English couplers on standard gauge stock
- GFV, Schwab, Scharfenberg or BSI couplers on passenger units
- AK69e couplers within BLS EW III sets
- GF, GFV or center buffer couplers/Balance lever couplings on meter and narrow gauge stock

=== Ukraine ===
- SA3 couplers on 1,520 mm (4 ft 11 27/32 in) gauge rolling stock
- Combined SA3 coupler/English couplers on SUW 2000 gauge-changing coaches
- Scharfenberg couplers on some EMU trains
- Central buffer and chain couplers on narrow gauge rolling stock

=== United Kingdom ===
- BSI couplers on most diesel multiple unit types, but also Dellner and Scharfenberg on some more recent types
- AAR Type H "Tightlock coupling" heads on 1970s to early 2000s electric multiple units
- Scharfenberg type heads (often Dellner) on most new electric multiple units, with a variety of electrical connection systems
- English coupler, AAR couplers on some freight stock, most locomotive-hauled passenger stock has a 2/3rd size Janney/Buckeye coupler
- Wedglock couplers, Ward couplers on London Underground stock
- Narrow gauge lines use various couplings

== Caribbean ==
=== Cuba ===
- AAR couplers

=== Jamaica ===
- AAR couplers

== Central America ==
=== Costa Rica ===
- AAR couplers on freight stock and locomotive-hauled passenger stock.
- Scharfenberg on DMUs (Spanish Apollo type and Chinese CRRC type).

=== Panama ===
- AAR couplers—Panama Canal Railway
- Link, pin and buffer—Panama canal mules

== North America ==
=== Canada ===
- AAR couplers on traditional stock
- Scharfenberg couplers, Wedglock coupler, H2C couplers on transit stock
- 3/4 size AAR couplers on the White Pass and Yukon Route

=== Mexico ===
- AAR couplers on traditional stock
- Scharfenberg couplers on new passenger stock

=== United States ===
- AAR couplers on mainline freight and passenger stock in the United States and Alaska
- Link Pin, Miller couplers on historic stock. Converted to AAR couplers 1893~1900 per Safety Appliance Act
- Tomlinson Couplers on some electric commuter railroads and metro systems. Examples include the Metra Electric District lines on the Chicago Metra system, the South Shore Line (NICTD), New York City Subway rolling stock, and WMATA rolling stock.
- Older city systems have unique coupler designs for transit stock, e.g. H2C couplers on New York City Subway rolling stock
- Scharfenberg couplers on newer light rail and transit systems
- Pin Cup coupler on multiple unit transit stock
- Russian couplers on industrial and mining Stock

==== Alaska ====
- AAR couplers on mainline freight and passenger stock in Alaska
- 3/4 size AAR couplers on the White Pass and Yukon Route

==== Puerto Rico ====
- Scharfenberg couplers on Tren Urbano

== Oceania ==
=== Australia ===
- English couplers, Norwegian couplers on historic stock
- AAR couplers on freight and passenger stock
- Scharfenberg couplers on passenger stock

=== New Zealand ===
- Norwegian couplers on legacy stock
- Janney couplers on modern freight and locomotives
- Scharfenberg couplers on modern EMUs

== South America ==
=== Argentina ===
- English couplers on 1,676 mm (5 ft 6 in) and on 1,435 mm (4 ft 8 1/2 in) standard gauge
- AAR couplers on 1,000 mm (3 ft 3 3/8 in) metre gauge and some passenger (FIAT 7131 DMUs) and freight rolling stock on standard and broad gauge.
- Small knuckle coupler with slot in knuckle for link and pin couplers on 750 mm (2 ft 5 1/2 in)
- Scharfenberg-type semi-automatic couplers on modern EMUs, DMUs and some passenger rolling stock:
  - Dellner in General San Martín Railway and General Bartolomé Mitre Railway on 1,435 mm track gauge
  - Shibata semi-automatic couplers on EMUs made by Toshiba-Marubeni Corp
    - 1956 D.F. Sarmiento Railway on 1,676 mm track gauge,
    - 1962 General Bartolomé Mitre Railway on 1,676 mm Track gauge, except for Tren de la Costa,
    - 1973 General Urquiza Railway on 1,435 mm track gauge,
    - 1983 General Roca Railway on 1,676 mm Track gauge EMUs.
  - Scharfenberg couplers on CAF made EMUs for Tren de la Costa on 1,435 mm track gauge.
- Bell-and-hook couplers on various narrow-gauge tourist railways (Ferrocarril Piedra Baya, Austral Fueguino Railway and Económico Sud Railway).

=== Brazil ===
- AAR couplers

=== Chile ===
- AAR couplers on 1,000 mm (3 ft 3 3/8 in) metre gauge
- English couplers (UIC) in coaches and locomotives bought from Spain
- Scharfenberg couplers in passenger units bought from Spain

=== Paraguay ===
- English couplers

=== Peru ===
- AAR couplers

=== Uruguay ===
- Buffers and chain couplers (Bulk of AFE stock, all of Portren-DBCC Transport)
- Janney Coupler (Brill 55, Brill 60 Motorcars (Historical), Ganz-Mavag DMUs and Coaches; previously Ganz 38, Simmering-Graz-Pauker DMUs and Coaches)
- Pin and cup Coupler (Uerdinger Railbus and trailers)

== See also ==
- Barrier vehicle
- Jane's World Railways, lists the coupler(s) used on any railway system
- Rail transport by country
