= C-AKv coupler =

Railway vehicle coupler

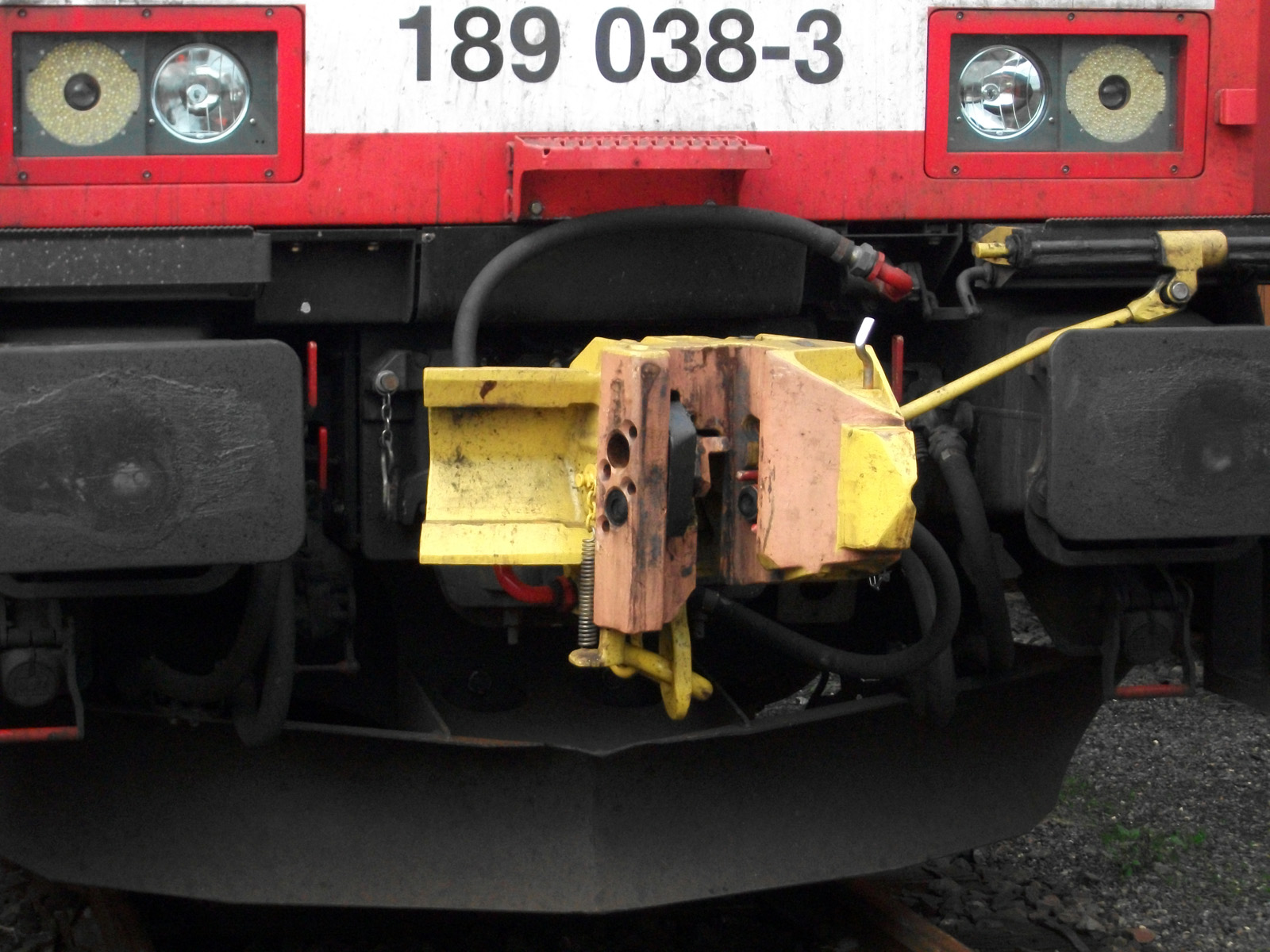
CAKv coupler on a DBAG Class 189 locomotive for heavy goods duty

The C-AKv is a fully automatic coupler design, also known as the Faiveley Transpact; it is a hybrid compatible with both buffers and chain couplers and Russian SA3 couplers, intended as an option for the long delayed EU transition to center buffer couplers. C-AKv is an abbreviation of Compact Automatische Kupplung vereinfacht in German, translating to Compact Automatic Coupler simplified in English.

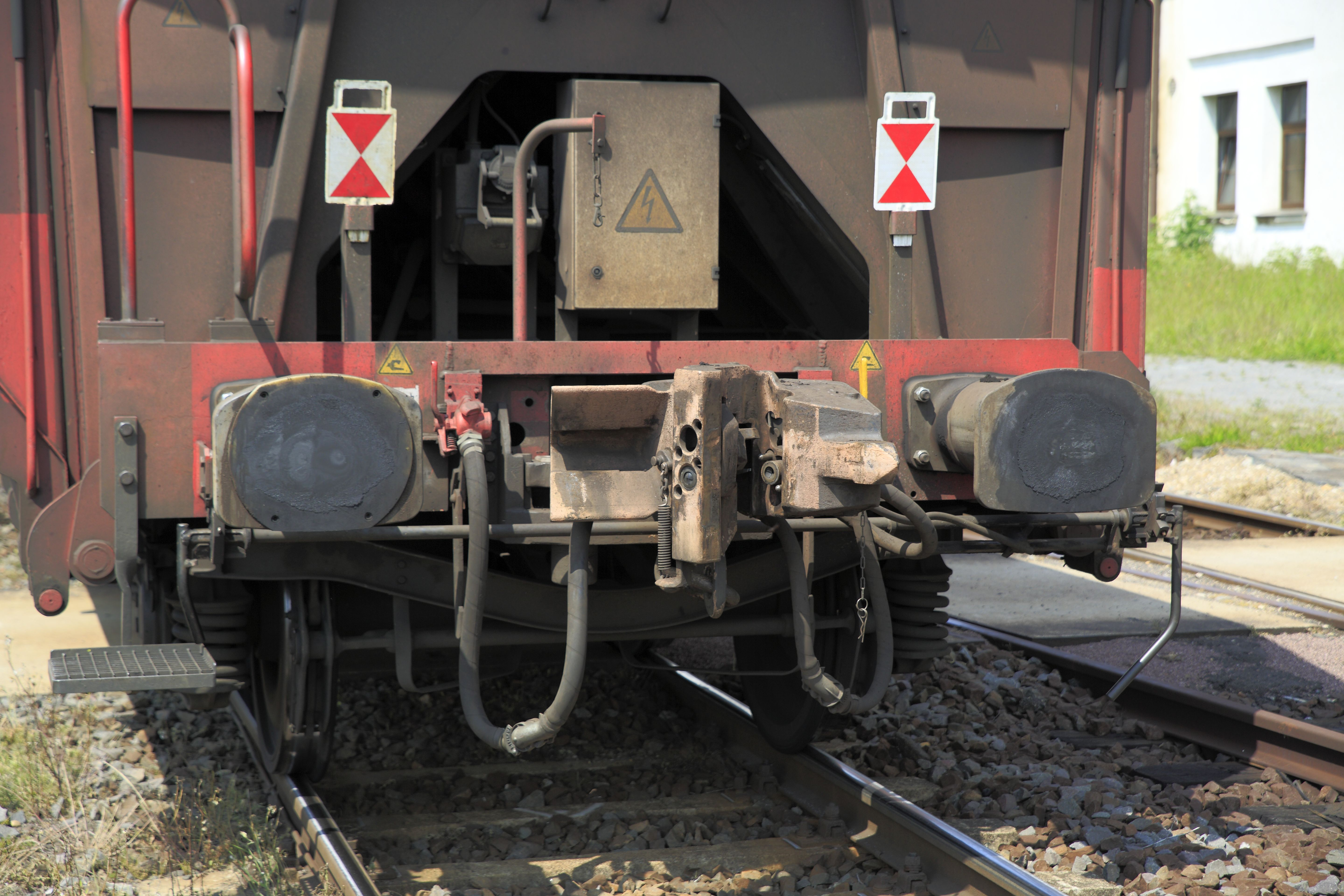
CAKv coupler on a goods wagon

== History ==
In the 1970s a new type of automatic coupler was developed by the European railways. This was called the UIC automatic coupler and represented a West European variant of the AK69e type and the East European Intermat type. It was intended as a full replacement for the buffers and chain setup, which is not suitable for heavy loads, very time-consuming to be connected, and requires intensive maintenance. As it would have had to be introduced all across Europe within a very short time frame, this introduction was repeatedly postponed. In addition, the UIC automatic coupler was not compatible with the existing chain couplings, which would have made this conversion prohibitively expensive for some of the European state railways to carry out.

The C-AKv coupler was developed by SAB WABCO, now Faiveley Transport Witten GmbH. Unlike the UIC automatic coupler, it is compatible with the existing chain coupler, which would allow for a longer transition period. Since the year 2002, the C-AKv has been on trial on the German railways. It is used on heavy coal block trains between the opencast mines at Profen and the Schkopau power plant.

At this time, the German railways, Faiveley and Technische Universität Berlin are developing possible transition scenarios for a general introduction of the C-AKv coupler.

== Heaviest trains ==
In a field test starting in 2004, the trains on the connection from the brown coal strip mine near Wählitz to the Schkopau Power Station were equipped with C-AKv-couplers which showed that regular wheel replacements shrunk below a third due to reduced wear. The solution has been kept and it spawned further investigations.

Beginning in late 2009, eighteen DBAG Class 189 electric locomotives owned by DB Schenker were converted to C-AKv couplers, in order to handle 6,000 tonne iron ore trains from Rotterdam to the Dillingen steel works in Saarland, replacing the previous German class 151 double units and Dutch class 6400 triple units commonly used on these workings previously. As these locomotives are also capable of operating on both the 15 kV AC and 25 kV AC (and 1.5 kV DC, for a short stretch under reduced power) overhead system on the German and Dutch networks, locomotive changes on the Dutch-German border are no longer required. Loaded trains are commonly operated by two 189s in a multiple unit setup, with the wagons retaining the AK69e type couplers they have been fitted with since the 1980s.

== Design ==
Being an evolved version of the UIC AK69e coupler, the C-AKv coupler has the same basic outline as the SA3 coupler. Unlike the Russian SA-3 coupler, however, connectors for brake air lines and – if required – electric conduits are integrated into the coupler, which are automatically connected while coupling up. Also, these pneumatic and electric connectors are compatible with the buffers and chain setup, as opposed to previous types.

Since the brake line and electric connectors are integrated into the coupler's main body rather than in a separate body part below the main body, as had been the case on the AK69e type, it is possible to couple C-AKV equipped stock to stock not thus equipped.

The design is much more compact than the former SA3 coupler. The shape is slightly different from that of the SA-3 coupler, due to an additional alignment horn and the matching pocket on the opposite side. These two components allow for greater vertical stability in two connected C-AKv couplers.

== See also ==
- Draft gear
- Railway coupling by country
- Unilink coupler
