= Digital automatic coupling =

Automatic railway coupling

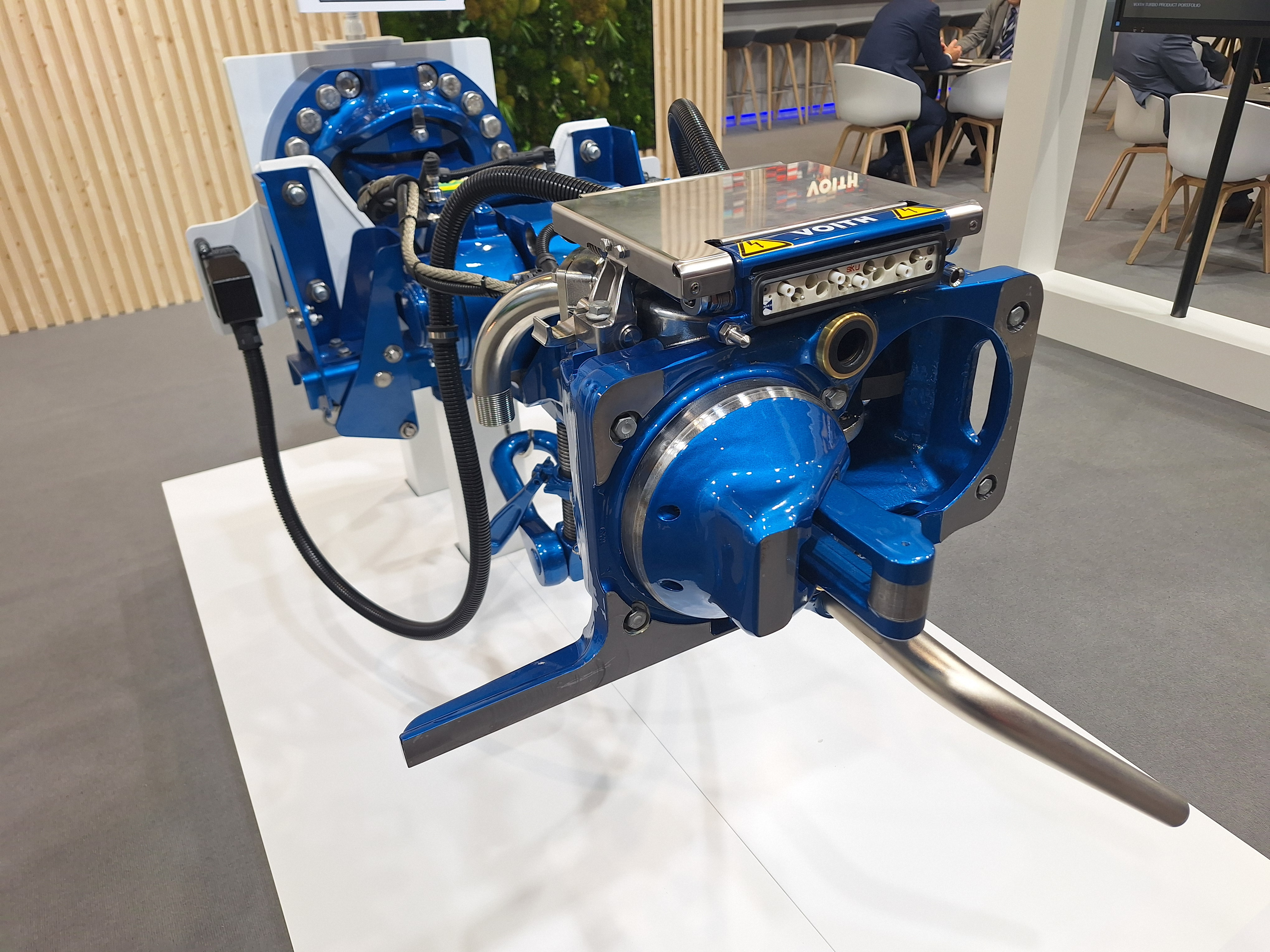
Voith's DAK product 2024

Digital automatic coupling (DAC) is a type of railway coupling for freight wagons developed in the 2020s to replace buffers and chain couplers, initially in Europe.

It resembles the Scharfenberg coupler with extra contacts to join electrical circuits (power, detection and control) and air hoses.

The DAC project is a key component of the European DAC Delivery Programme (EDDP), which is supported by the European Union. DAC provides a continuous power and data line throughout the train, allowing for real-time monitoring and data transmission between wagons. The system is among several innovations being developed within European working groups to harmonize the rail network and aims to boost freight traffic by 2030. Although not a member of the European Union, Switzerland is associated with the project and wants to subsidize the transition to digital automatic coupling on its territory.

The development of the coupler type was finished in mid 2026. The design is based on the Voith CargoCoupler that had been developed for Swiss Federal Railways since 2017, itself based on the Scharfenberg Type 10 coupler as used for high-speed rail in Europe. The Pioneer DAC Trains (PioDAC) will use the new coupler in regular commercial service by 2027. Retroffitting guidelines are being developed until 2029 with serial installation planned in the time frame from 2031 to 2036.

== Advantages ==
- Longer trains up to 750 m.
- Brakes remotely controlled like electronically controlled pneumatic brakes.
- Monitoring of train and wagon performance.
- Safety. No need for shunter to climb between buffers.

== Function levels ==
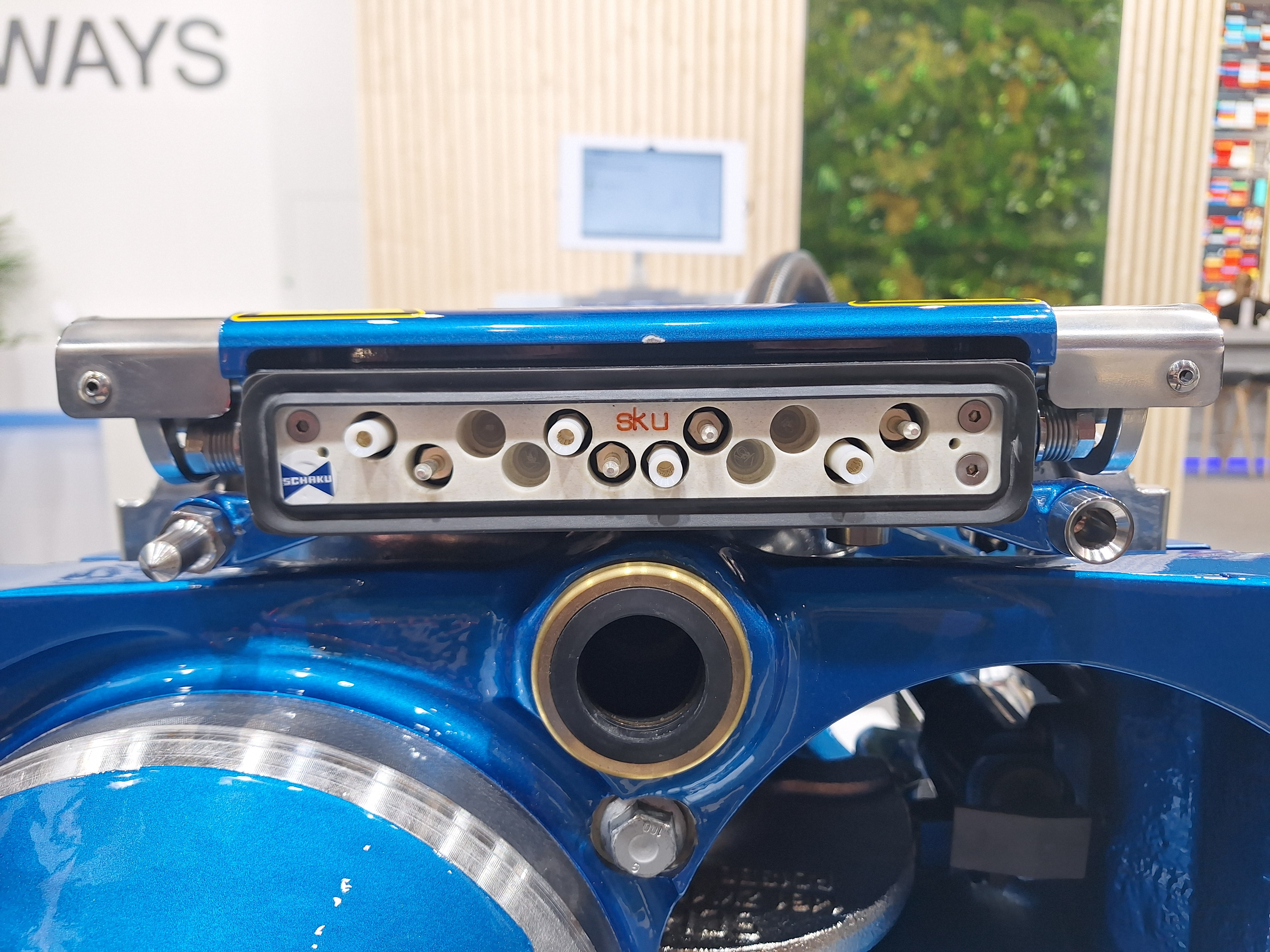
DAK e-coupler (placed atop)

Automatic couplers are categorized into five different levels in general.

- no automation
- Level 1: automated mechanic coupling (air pipes manual coupling)
- Level 2: Level 1 plus automatic coupling of air pipes (partial uncoupling with a lever)
- Level 3: Level 2 plus automatic coupling of power cables (allows uncoupling with switch)
- Level 4: Level 3 plus automatic coupling of data cables (allows uncoupling at a signal)
- Level 5: Level 4 plus remote automatic uncoupling

For the DAC the function levels are narrowed down to specific functions. The function level DAK-3 must connect the electronically controlled pneumatic brakes. The function level DAK-4 must connect the e-coupler including electric supply (400 V) and digital sockets. The function level DAK-5 must allow for remote uncoupling using an electric motor (the DAK does not use uncoupling air pipes as defined in EN 16019 for high-speed trains). Rollout plans may use function level DAK-4 when prepared for an update to DAK-5.

== Safe remote uncoupling ==
In addition to uncoupling from the driver's cab, the DAC must also enable uncoupling while moving on the shunting hump. In addition to a mechanical device using a cable pull/uncoupling lever, the demonstrator also had an electrical device with switches on a control panel attached to the side of the car. Further development should enable electrical uncoupling both from the train and from a tablet or hump computer. This is essentially software development with high safety requirements.

== Other systems ==
Couplings based on AAR and SA3 already have automated mechanical couplings, so some of the advantageous features of DAC are lessened. These have a maximum draw gear load well in excess of that possible with the DAC, say 1800 m instead of 750 m.

== Makers ==
- Dellner
- Knorr Bremse

== See also ==
- Railway coupling
- Railway coupling by country
