= SA3 coupler =

Automatic coupler for railway use

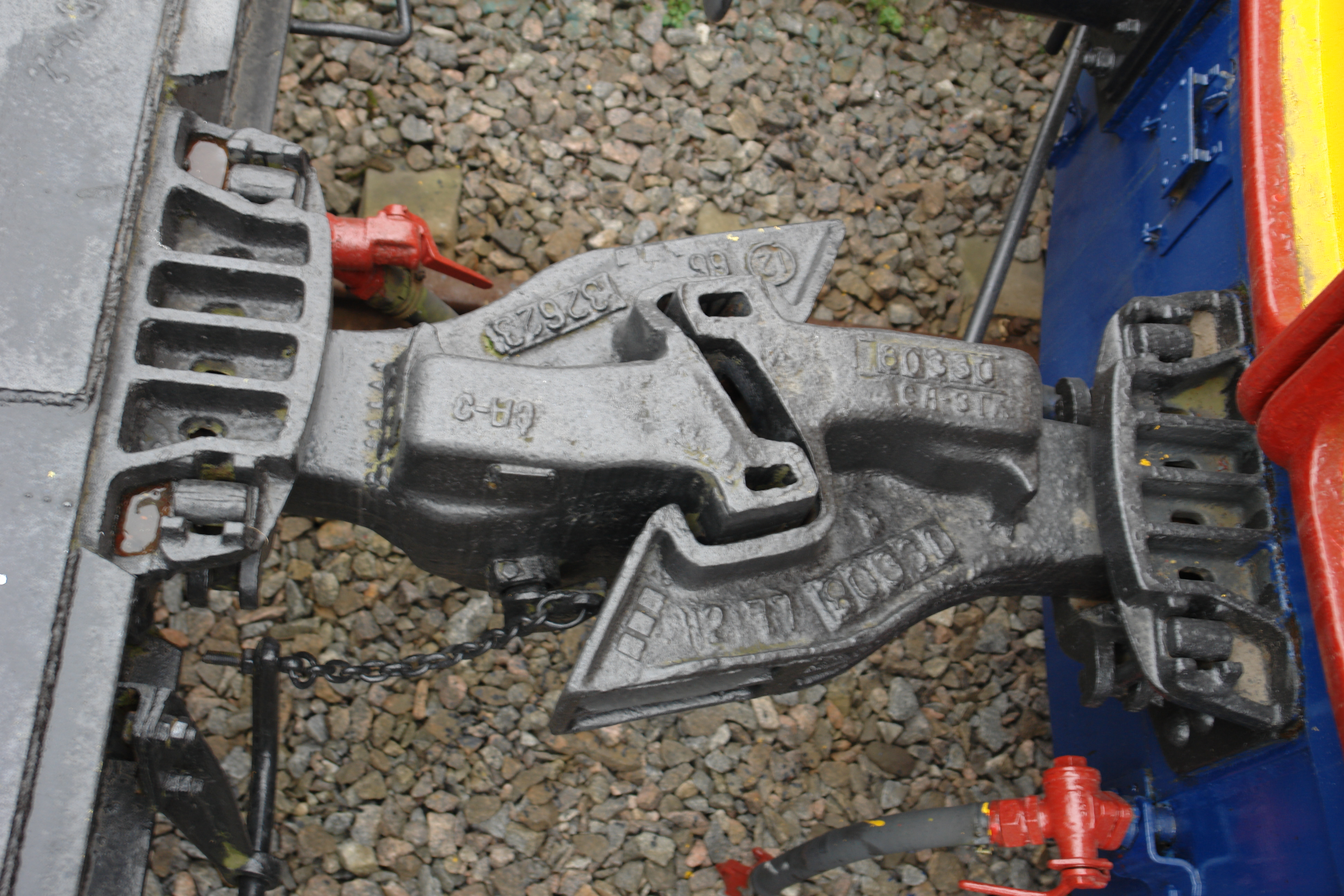
SA3 couplers

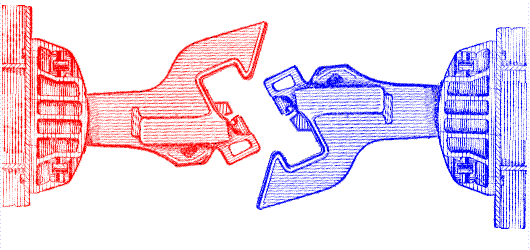
Click here for animation of coupling

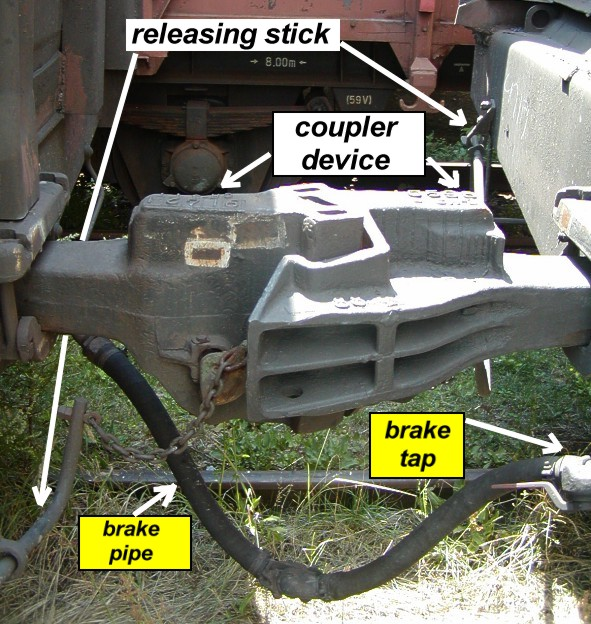
SA3 details

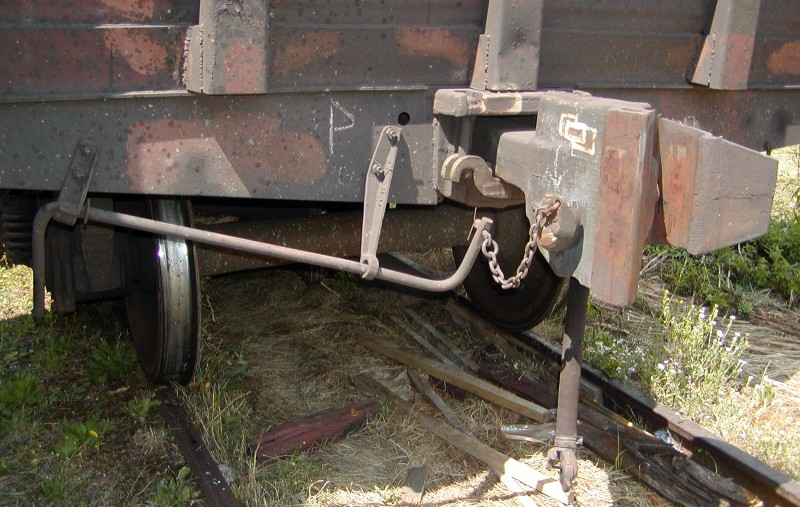
End view of SA3 coupler, with release lever to the left.

SA3 couplers (also known as СА3 or СА-3 couplers per the typical foundry stamp on top of these couplers, meaning "Советская Автосцепка, 3" in Russian or "Soviet Auto-latch 3" in English) or Willison coupler and Russian coupler are railway couplings used primarily in Russia and states influenced by the former Soviet Union, such as Finland, Poland, and Mongolia.

Russian railways originally used buffers and chain couplers during Imperial era, however these had several disadvantages: their draft load was limited, they were susceptible to buffer lock, and they were not semiautomatic like the North American Janney couplers. Conversion to Janney couplers (as Japan and Australia had) was considered, as was development of a new design. The Willison coupler was patented in Germany (1914) and in US (1916) by English locksmith John Willison from Derby, England. The Knorr-Bremse company bought the invention in 1912 and it started to be used in Germany for some heavy trains and some suburban trains in Berlin and Paris. In the 1930s, the Soviets improved on this design and then decided to make this coupler standard across the Russian railway system.

== Experimentation ==
In the late 1920s, the UIC had established a working group for the replacement of the chain link coupler, which restricts the efficiency of freight railroads in a major way. Many railroads ran prototypes. In Germany, coal trains with Scharfenberg couplers yielded unfavourable results in winter weather, other railroads did similar tests. But the UIC was not able to agree on one replacement. This failure of the UIC, which hampers freight operation in Europe even today, led to the decision by the Soviet Union to move forward without a standard being achieved in the talks.

The coupler was developed in 1932 and named SA3 (abbreviation of Russian Советская автосцепка, 3-й вариант, Soviet Automatic-Coupler 3rd Variant) and was an improved version of the Willison coupler, with better design of lock parts and mechanics. Conversion of rolling stock began in 1935. The Second World War delayed the introduction, so that the conversion was completed only 1957.

== Operation ==
Helper locomotives at the end of the train are rarely used in the countries of the former Soviet Union. The load of the freight per train is not as heavy as on American railways.

Although the SA3 coupler is primarily used in the countries of the former Soviet Union, they are visible every day at the transshipping stations, at the eastern borders of the European Union (Poland, Slovakia and Hungary). Since bogie exchange technology has progressed, this allows for cars with SA3 couplers to regularly operate on the standard gauge tracks. A special converter car is inserted between standard and Russian gauge cars for this operation, with different couplers (SA3 and standard) on either end. Although these coupling freight cars have room for cargo, they are always operated empty.

If the vehicle fitted with the SA3 retains its buffers, then a special adapter allows that vehicle to couple to another vehicle fitted with buffers and chain, provided that the buffers have the same spacing or gauge. This appears to be done in Iran.

On the Uzhhorod–Košice broad-gauge track between Košice and Uzhhorod, Ukraine, of which the major part is on Slovak territory, SA3 couplings are used exclusively. The railway is used for ore and coal transports from Kryvyi Rih, Ukraine, to the US Steel mill in Košice and coal to the power plant of Vojany.

In addition, the heavy iron ore trains on the Swedish Malmbanan began to use SA3 couplings in 1969 after problems with snapping chain couplers and a need for ever increasing capacity with higher train weights. Today, IORE locomotives haul trains of 68 hopper cars of 120 tonnes (120 long tons; 130 short tons) with a total weight of over 8,000 tonnes (7,900 long tons; 8,800 short tons) over gradients of 1% in harsh weather conditions, from the LKAB mine in Kiruna to the ice-free harbour of Narvik, Norway, using couplings of the SA3 type without any problem. They tried out Janney couplers, too, when moving beyond 8,000 tons because SA3 hasn't seen much use at such loads before that: in the Soviet Union, freight trains rarely exceeded 6,000 tons. The earlier SJ Dm3 locomotives had buffers fitted; therefore, they can couple with rolling stock fitted with buffers and chain.

The longest and heaviest train with SA3 couplings ran on 20 February 1986 from Ekibastuz to the Urals, Soviet Union. The composition consisted of 439 coal wagons and several diesel locomotives distributed along the train with a mass of 43,400 tonnes and the total length of 6.5 km (4.0 mi).

=== Heaviest regular load ===
- Mauritania railway hauls iron ore trains of about 21,000 tonnes.
- The heaviest load for the SA3 in Ukraine is 12,000 tonnes.
- Uzhhorod–Košice broad-gauge track iron ore trains of 4,200 tonnes.

== Developments ==
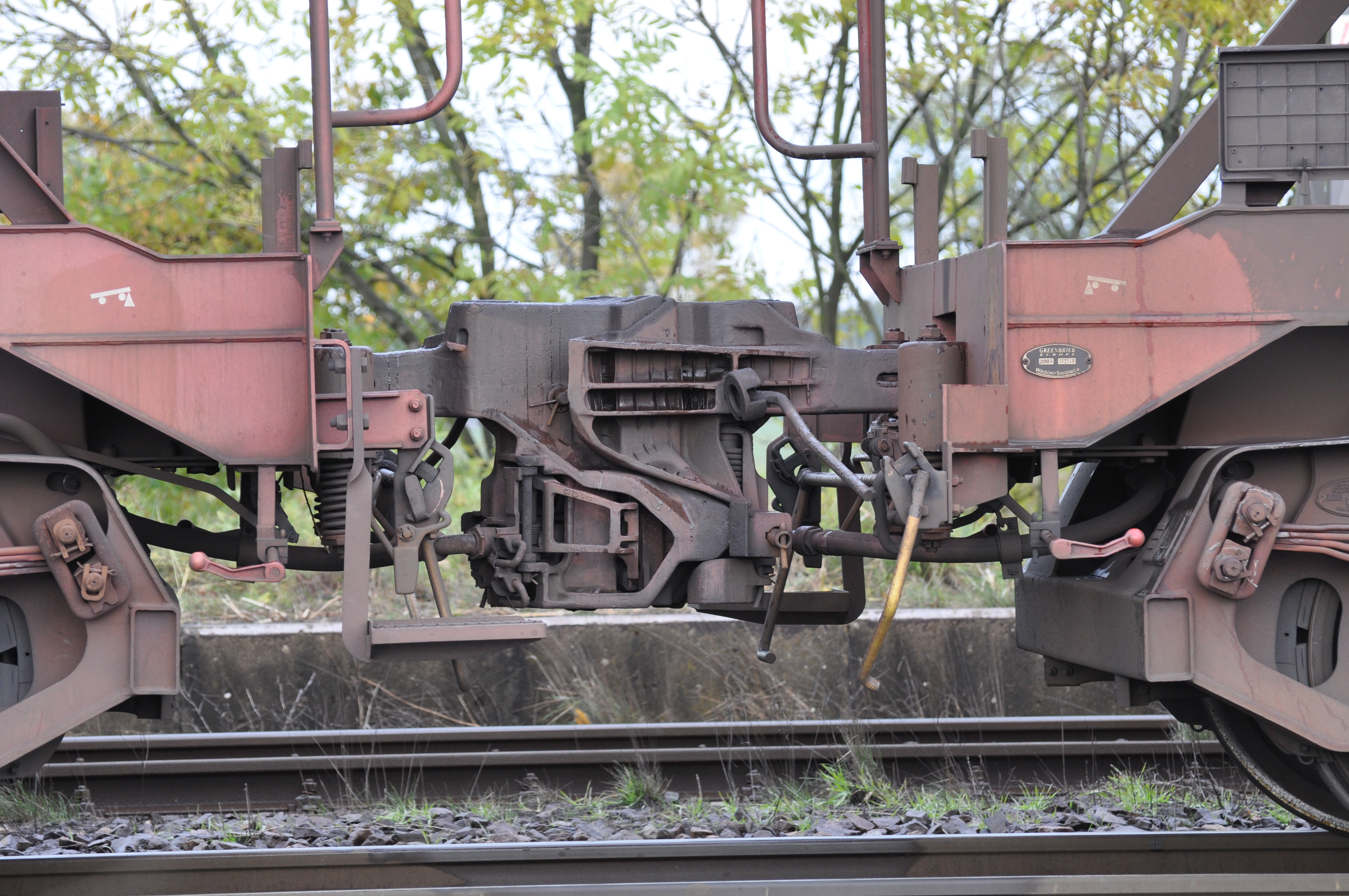
Unicoupler/Intermat/AK69e coupler on cargo train

Based on the mechanical design of SA3 couplers has begun the development of a common European coupler under the umbrella of the UIC and the OSShD. For the latter was tasked the Waggonbau Bautzen (GDR) and on the part of the UIC the Knorr Bremse (FRG). The result were the fully tested and ready for production design Unicoupler. Beside an installation for heavy ore trains in West Germany was no commercial application.

At the end of the 1980s a separate development in West Germany aimed to mitigate some issues of Unicoupler. It was known under the label Z-AK, but got no practical relevance.

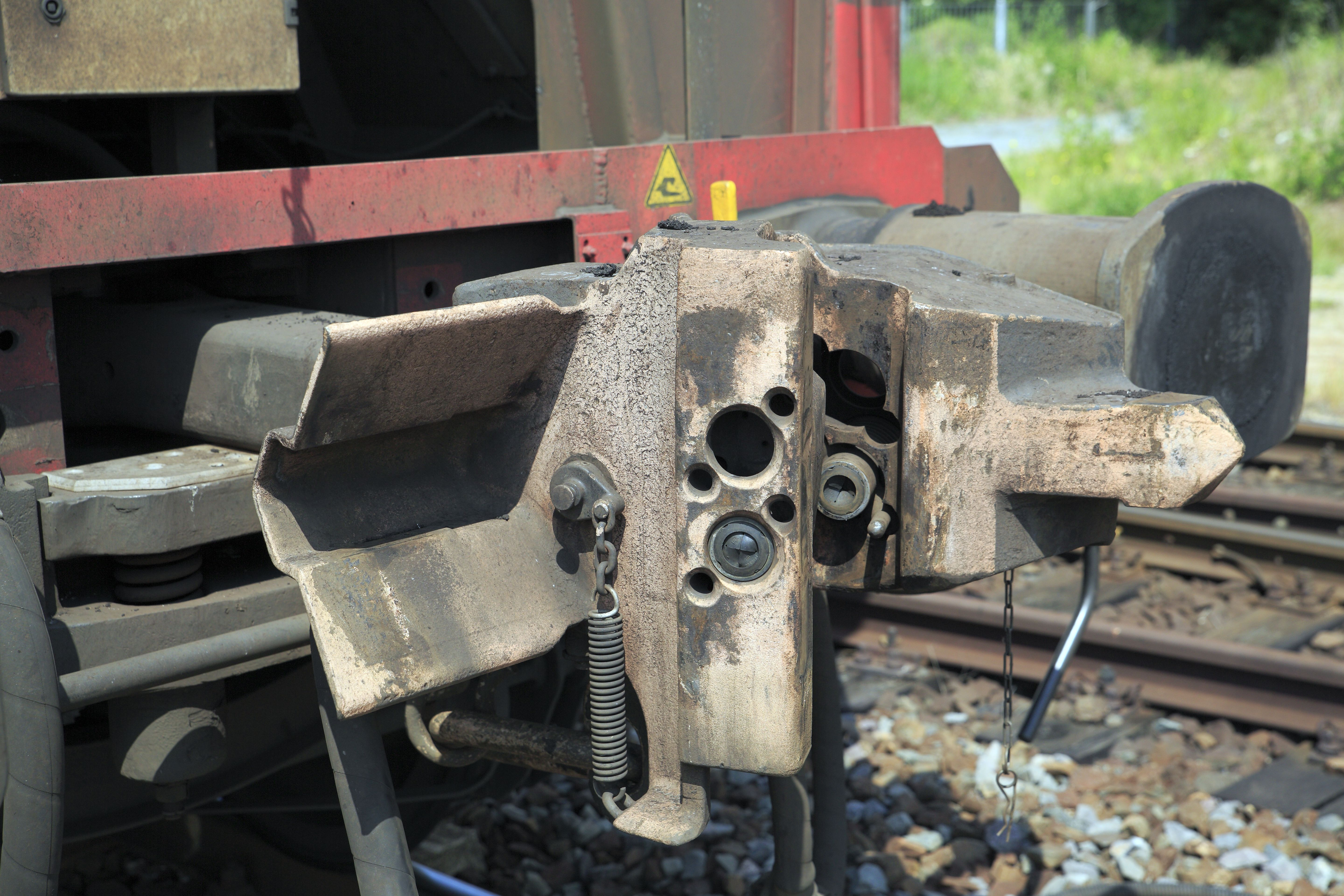
Detailed view of a C-AKv coupling head

At the end of the 1990s SAB WABCO (now Faiveley Transport Witten) restarted development of a coupler on mechanical SA3 scheme. It was named C-AKv and has different solutions for the problems of pneumatic and electric couplings. It also has vertical stability added, so that the coupling cannot fall down and damage the tracks or cause a derailment. It is compatible with the standard SA3 coupler and will have buffers needed for use with the standard buffers and chain couplers. The electric plugs would be most useful with electronically controlled pneumatic brakes. The practical tests started in 2002 with heavy cargo trains in coal mining in Germany. The C-AKv was a strong candidate for a common European automatic coupler as a joining successor on the Eurasian continent.

During the preparation for a common digital automatic coupling (DAC) in the EU, there was another SA3-compatible coupler contributed by CAF, but it was not chosen.

== Usage ==
The former Soviet Union:

- Armenia, Armenian Railways
- Azerbaijan, Azerbaijan Railways
- Belarus, Belarusian Railway
- Estonia, Eesti Raudtee
- Georgia, Georgian Railways
- Kazakhstan, Kazakhstan Temir Zholy
- Kyrgyzstan, Kyrgyz Railways
- Latvia, Latvian Railways
- Lithuania, Lithuanian Railways
- Moldova, Calea Ferată din Moldova
- Russia, Russian Railways
- Turkmenistan, Türkmendemirýollary
- Tajikistan, Rail transport in Tajikistan
- Ukraine, Ukrainian Railways
- Uzbekistan, Uzbek Railways

=== Other countries with extensive usage ===
- Cameroon, Camrail
- Finland, Rail transport in Finland
- Gabon, Trans-Gabon Railway (called Willison coupler)
- Iran, Islamic Republic of Iran Railways
- Iraq, Iraqi Republic Railways
- Mauritania Railway operated by Société Nationale Industrielle et Minière
- Mongolia, Rail transport in Mongolia
- Turkey, Rail transport in Turkey

=== Some usage ===
- Australia; Miniature Willison used on some sugarcane tramways and underground colliery railways.
- Netherlands; Koninklijke Hoogovens (Tata Steel Europe): used on railways within the steel plant complex.
- Norway and Sweden (Malmbanan/Ofotbanen); Used exclusively by heavy iron-ore trains.
- Poland (Broad Gauge Metallurgy Line); The longest broad gauge railway line in Poland. It is used only for freight traffic, mainly iron ore and coal.
- Slovakia (Uzhhorod–Košice broad-gauge track); Heavy iron-ore transports from Ukraine.
- United States; Willison Coupler used in mining and tunneling railroads.

== See also ==
- C-AKv coupler
- Draft gear
- Gangway connection
- Janney couplers, used by the heaviest trains up to 30,000 short tons
  (27,216 t; 26,786 long tons).
- Intermat coupler
- Longest trains of 2.5 km (1.6 mi)
- Railway coupling by country
- Unicoupler/Intermat
- Unilink coupler

== External ==
- Adapter piece between SA3 coupler and Janney coupler
