= Barrier vehicle =

Railway vehicle used to connect two others that have different types of coupling

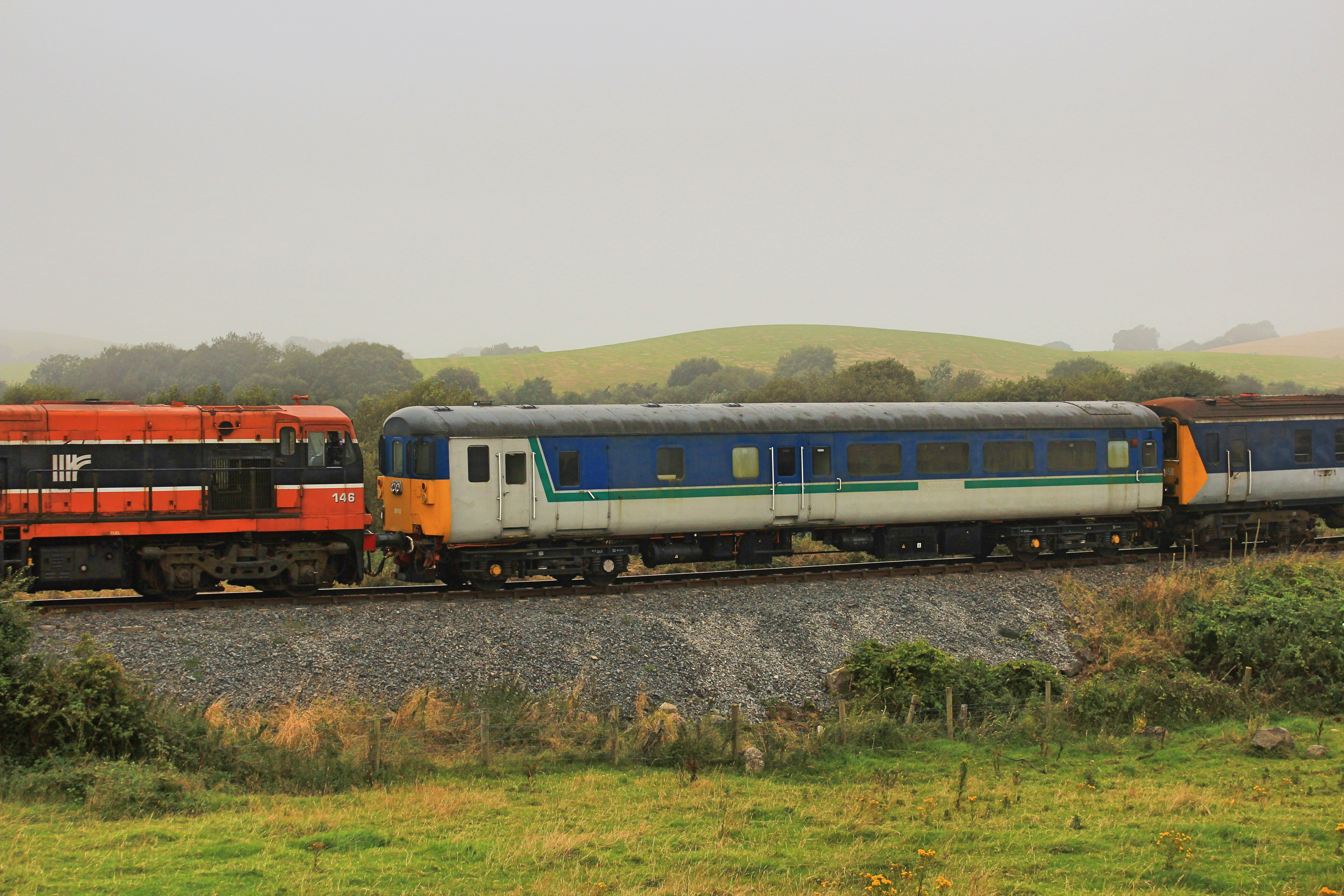
A preserved example of a translator carriage - at the Downpatrick and County Down Railway in Ireland, the former NI Railways DBSO is used to allow a 141 Class diesel locomotive with buffers and chain couplers to haul a 450 Class railcar with tightlock couplers.

A barrier vehicle (BV), barrier wagon, match wagon or translator coach is used to convert between non-matching railway coupler types. This allows locomotives to pull railway vehicles or parts of a train with a different type of coupler. A match wagon has an identical dual coupling at both ends.

== Use ==
They are often found on empty coaching stock moves where freight locomotives need to transport coaching stock fitted with Scharfenberg couplers and other automatic couplers. The use of barrier coaches has evolved with a general move from conventional passenger trains consisting of locomotive-hauled coaches, to trains consisting of multiple units.

== Liveries ==
These vehicles tend to be neutrally liveried or in some cases are painted with the livery of a particular rolling stock company. For example, Porterbrook use corporately-liveried examples for delivery of rolling stock and for transfers for refurbishment and maintenance.

== Gallery ==
Barrier vehicles and match wagons

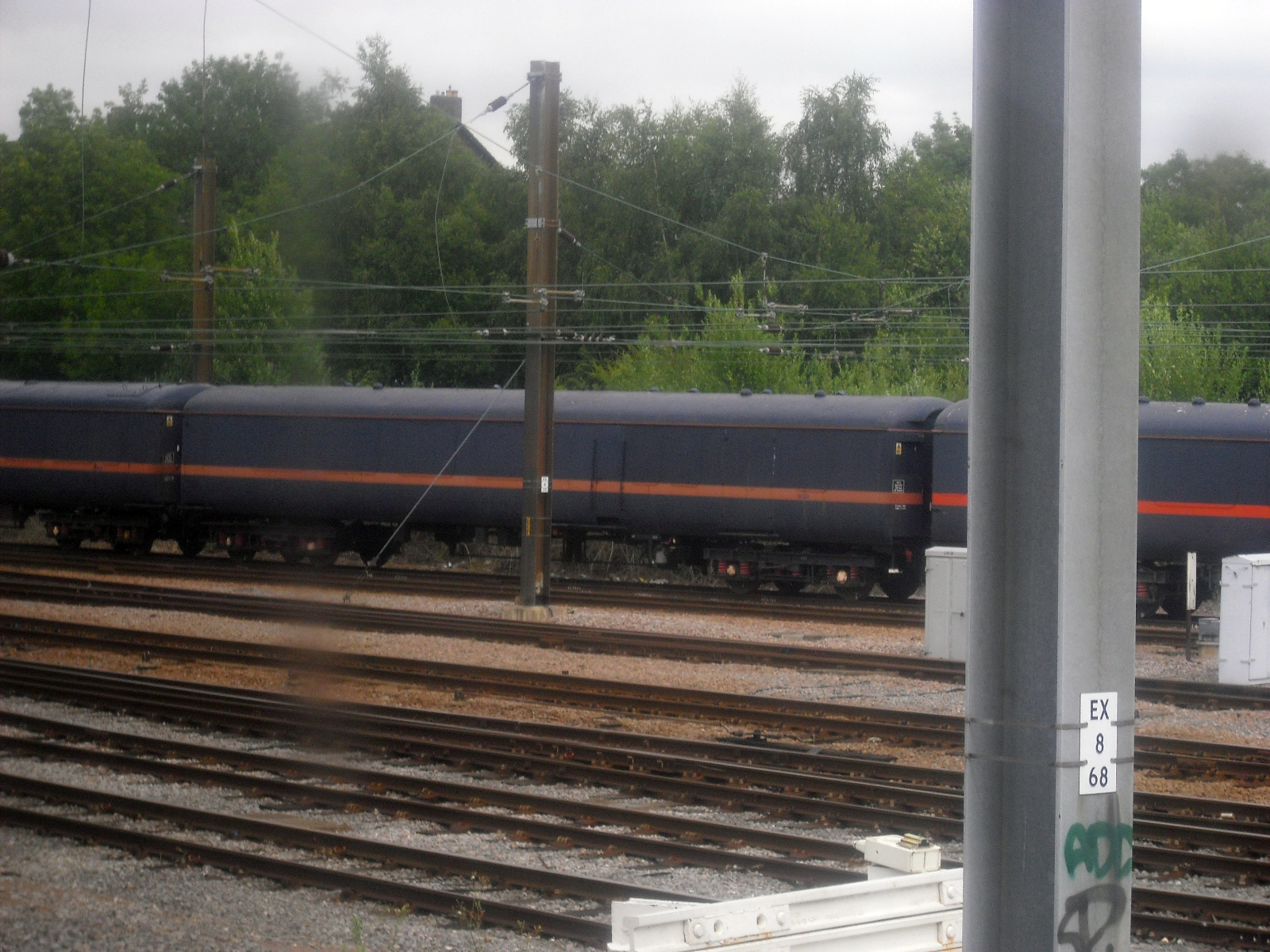
Bounds Green TMD, London: windowless barrier coaches for moving Mk4 passenger stock fitted without buffer and chain couplers

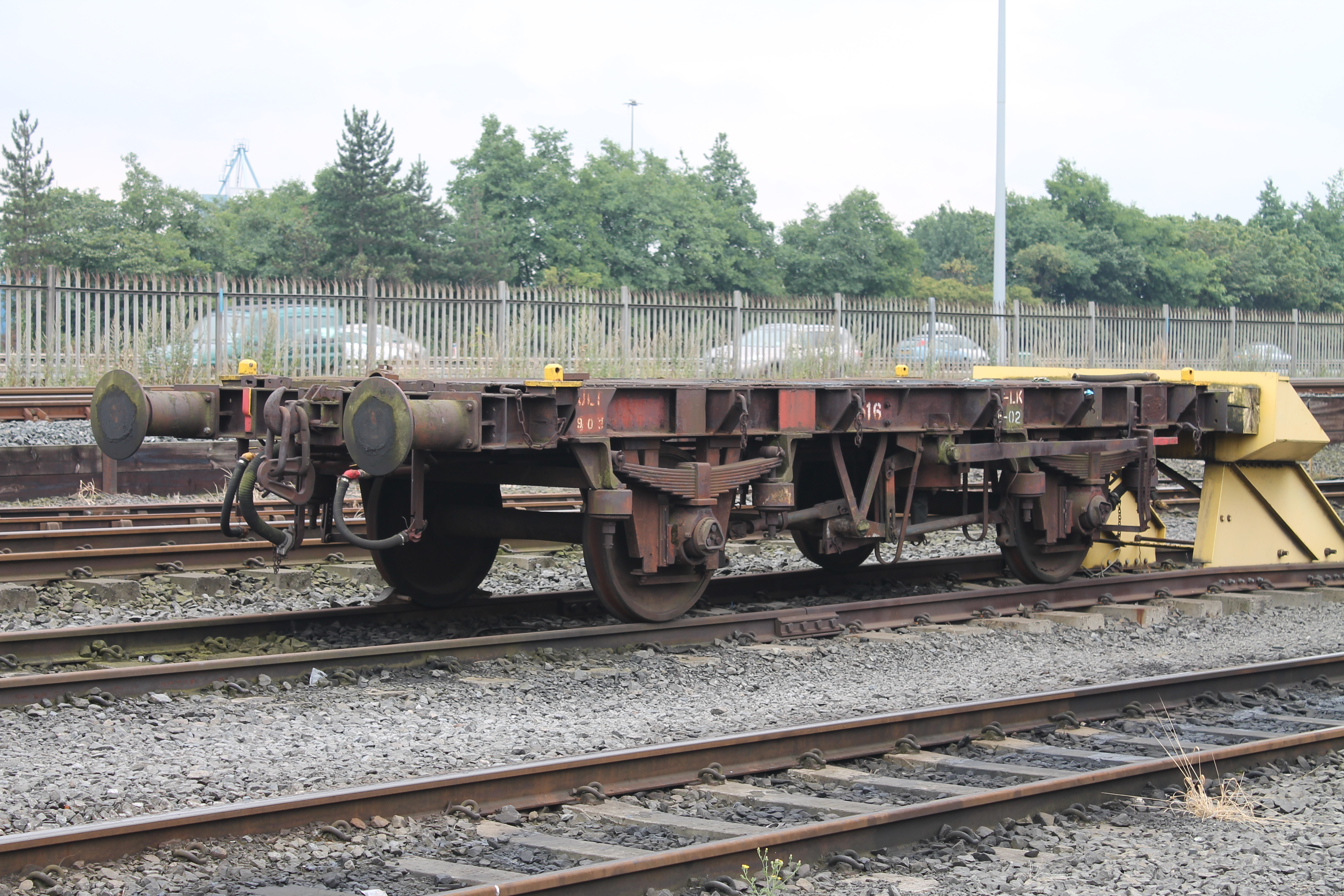
A barrier vehicle at NI Railways' York Road yard. It has an instanter coupler and buffers at one end for use by 111 Class or 201 Class diesel locomotives and Dellner couplers at the other end for use with DeDietrich carriages.

== See also ==
- Dual coupling
- Idler flatcar
