= Janes World Railways =

Publisher of railroad information

Janes World Railways (JWR) is a directory of railway activities worldwide. It is published annually by Jane's Information Services. Janes World Railways provides details on railway systems and operators, manufacturers of equipment, technology and services, and consultancy associations. The publication updates its content using data from governmental and non-governmental organizations, private businesses, and academic institutions. The publication offers railway profiles with detailed data covering operators and systems in nearly 140 countries, plus information on 2,000 manufacturers, suppliers and service companies.

== Contents ==
The publication includes information on the following areas:

Equipment:

- Bogies and suspension, wheels, axles and bearings
- Brakes and drawgear
- Cables and cable equipment
- Diesel engines, transmission and fueling systems
- Electric traction, freight yard and terminal equipment
- Locomotives and powered and non-powered passenger vehicles
- Passenger coach and freight vehicles equipment
- Revenue collection systems and station equipment

Data & Technology

- Information technology systems
- Organizational structures
- Passenger information systems
- Principal infrastructure details of networks
- Rolling-stock fleet data
- Signalling and communication systems
- Simulation and training systems
- Traffic and revenue statistics

Contact Information

- Consultancy services
- Electrification contractors and equipment suppliers
- Manufacturers of locomotives and passenger vehicles
- Permanent way components, equipment and services
- Railway associations and agencies
- Rolling-stock leasing companies
- Turnkey systems contractors
- Vehicle maintenance equipment and services

=== Maps and diagrams ===
The yearbook contains many maps of railway systems, which since about 1990 have been redrawn in a consistent style.

The yearbook also contains many diagrams of structure gauges and loading gauges for some but not all countries.

=== Other data ===
The yearbook also give the kind and height of the coupler used by any railway, as well as the height of buffers where used.

The yearbook also gives the minimum radii of many, but not all, railways.

== Editors ==
- 2020 – Ankush Singh
- 2019 – Ankush Singh
- 2018 – Ankush Singh
- 2003 – Jackie Clarke & Ken Harris
- 1986 – G. Freeman Allen
- 1976 – Paul J. Goldsack
- 1971 – Henry Sampson

== Issue ==
- 2002-03 is edition forty-four.
- ISSN 0075-3084

== See also ==
- List of railroad-related periodicals
- Railway coupling by country
