= Tightlock coupling =

Type of railcar coupler

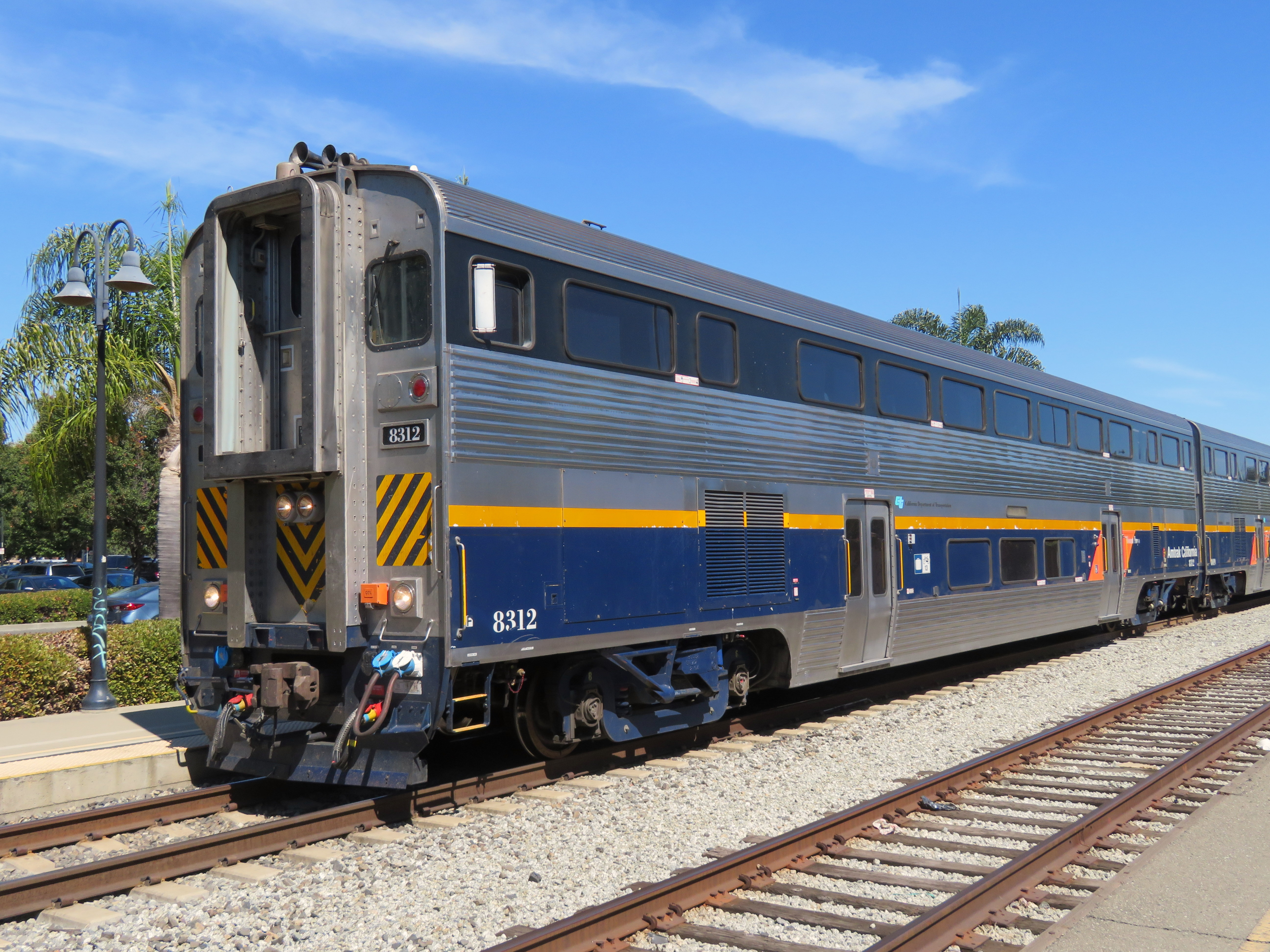
Type H Tightlock couplers on a California Car cab car with separate air brake and head end power connections

Type H Tightlock couplers are a variety of Janney coupler, typically used on North American mainline passenger rail cars. They have mechanical features that reduce slack in normal operation and prevent telescoping in derailments, yet remain compatible with other Janney types used by North American freight railroads.

Like all Janney couplers, the Tightlock is "semi-automatic". The couplers automatically lock when cars are pushed together, but workers must go between cars to hook up the air lines for the pneumatic brakes and connect cables for head-end power and other communications. To separate cars, a worker must use a lever to move the locking pin that keeps the coupler closed.

In Europe, some operators experimented with making fully automatic tightlock couplers by adding integral pneumatic and electric connectors, but these connections proved unreliable, and most have switched to the more common fully automatic Scharfenberg coupler.

Janney Type H Tightlock coupler standards were established by the Association of American Railroads, which transferred the standard to the American Public Transportation Association in 1971 when passenger service was nationalized in the United States from most private railway companies to Amtrak.

On a standard-gauge railway, the nominal mounting height for the coupler (rail top to coupler center) is 33 inches (838 mm), with a 34 1/2 ± 1 inch (876 ± 25 mm) maximum height on empty cars and 31 1/2 ± 1 inch (800 ± 25 mm) minimum height on loaded cars.

== AAR Type F ==
AAR Type F Vertical InterLock couplers, often mistaken for the Type H Tightlock, are another variety, typical on North American gondola wagons that go through rotary dumpers.

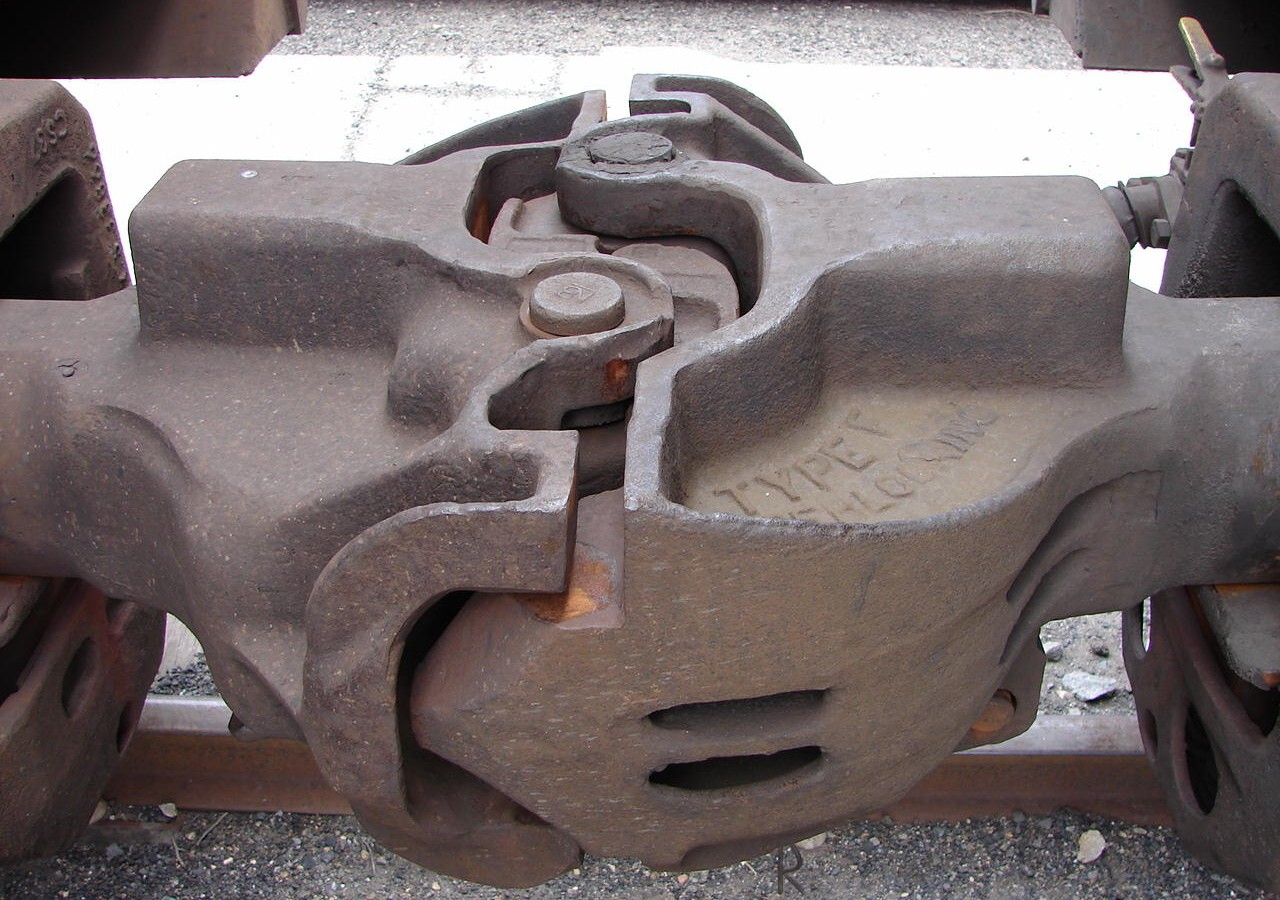
Type F Interlock couplers

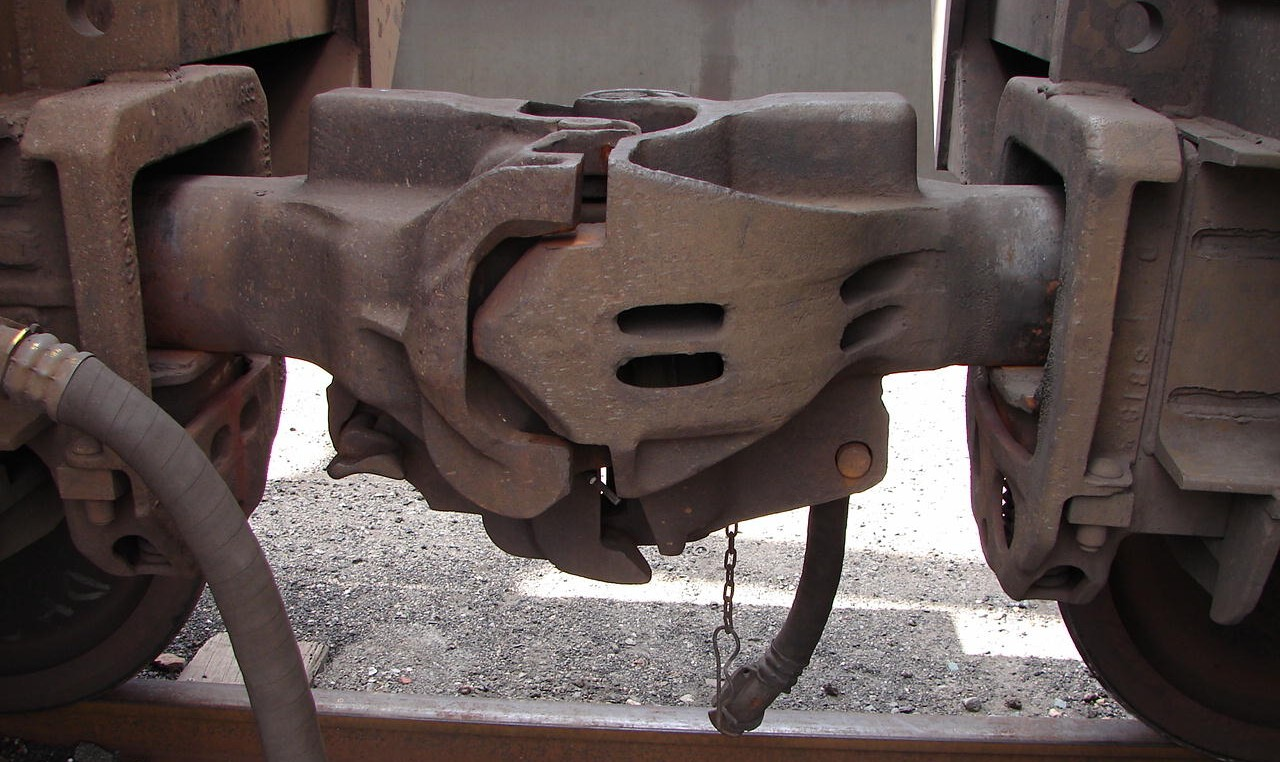
Type F Interlock couplers

== Tightlock use in the United Kingdom ==
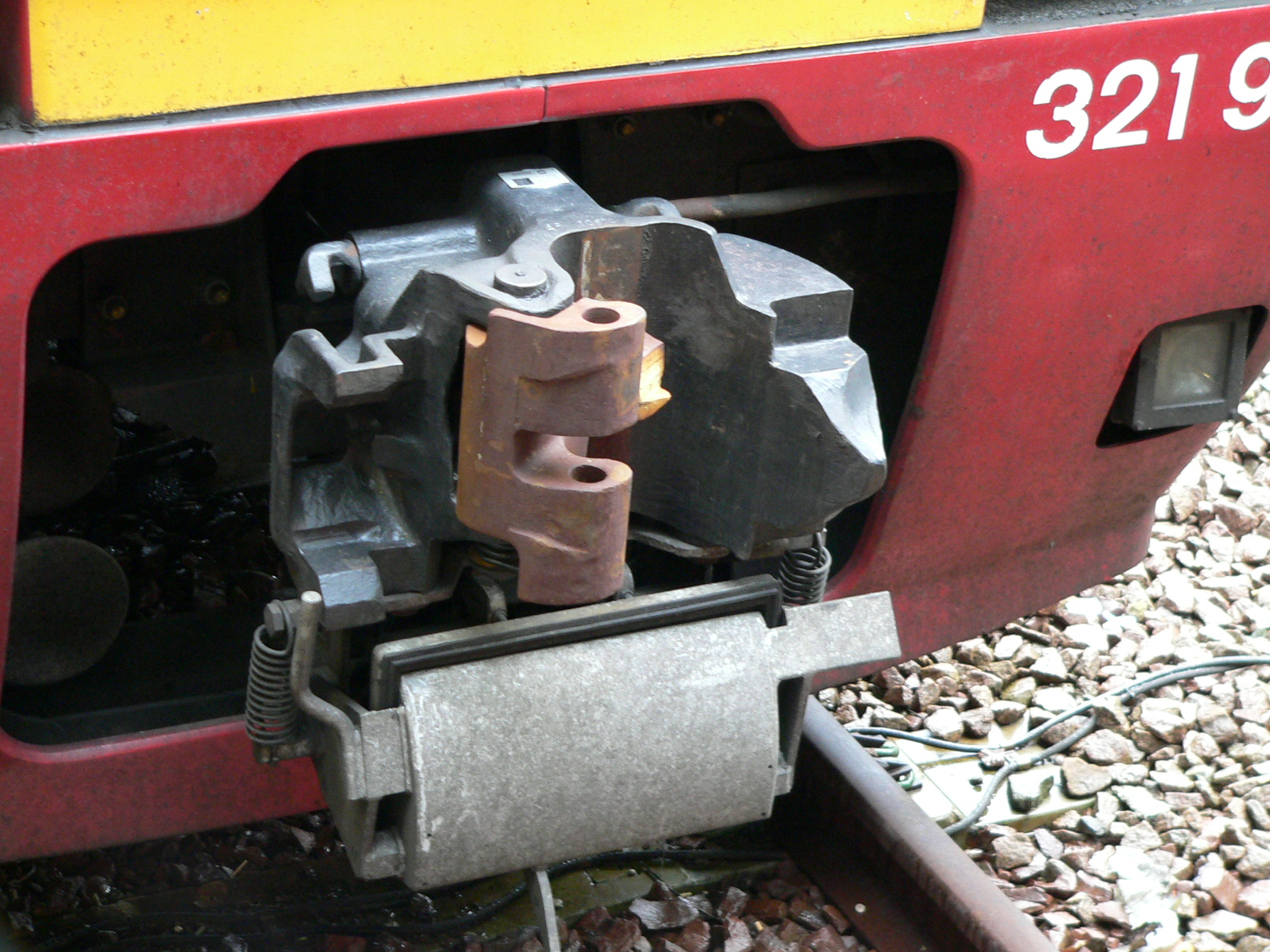
Type H Tightlock couplers on a British Rail Class 321 EMU with integral air brake and head end power connections

Type H couplers are in widespread use on multiple unit passenger trains in the UK built from the mid 1970s onwards. The previous generation of slam door units fitted with Buckeye/Henricot couplers had required a shunter to get down onto the track and stand between the two units to manually trip the coupler mechanism as well as connect or disconnect the air pipes and electrical jumper leads. In order to reduce staffing costs and cut down station dwell times, British Rail looked to incorporate an automatic coupler mechanism in its new power-door trains. Class 313 units were the first stock to incorporate this. Air-operated Tightlock couplers were chosen, together with underslung electrical connector boxes controlled by a Drum switch, and this allowed drivers to single-handedly attach or split a train without having to leave the cab.

Classes of train equipped included:

- Class 313
- Class 314
- Class 315
- Class 317
- Class 318
- Class 319
- Class 320
- Class 321
- Class 322
- Class 323
- Class 365
- Class 357
- Class 465
- Class 466
- Class 507
- Class 508

Tightlock was generally a success in the UK, but there were reliability issues and some notable incidents occurred where trains divided in service. The constant couple-uncouple cycles of heavy London commuter services caused the couplers' mechanisms to wear out faster than expected. Connex South Eastern's Networker fleet was particularly susceptible to this and the company blamed its drivers in the media, then changed its coupling instructions to drivers to include a "push-on, pull off" power test and visual inspection to ensure that the knuckles had engaged fully.

By the early 2000s the first batch of Bombardier Electrostar Class 375s had been built with Tightlock couplers for Connex South Central and Connex South Eastern, but it was quickly decided that Dellner couplings would be preferable. All subsequent units were built with these, and their earlier examples were eventually modified.

All multiple-unit trains built for the UK since then have been equipped with Dellner couplings.

== See also ==
- Changes to the Janney coupler since 1873
- Draft gear
- Drawbar
- Gangway connection
- Jane's World Railways, lists the coupler(s) used on any railway system
- Length over headstocks
- Multi-function couplers
- Railway coupling
- Railway coupling by country
- Rotary car dumper
- Safety of tank cars
- Slack action
- Three-point hitch
