= Norwegian coupling =

Railroad coupling system

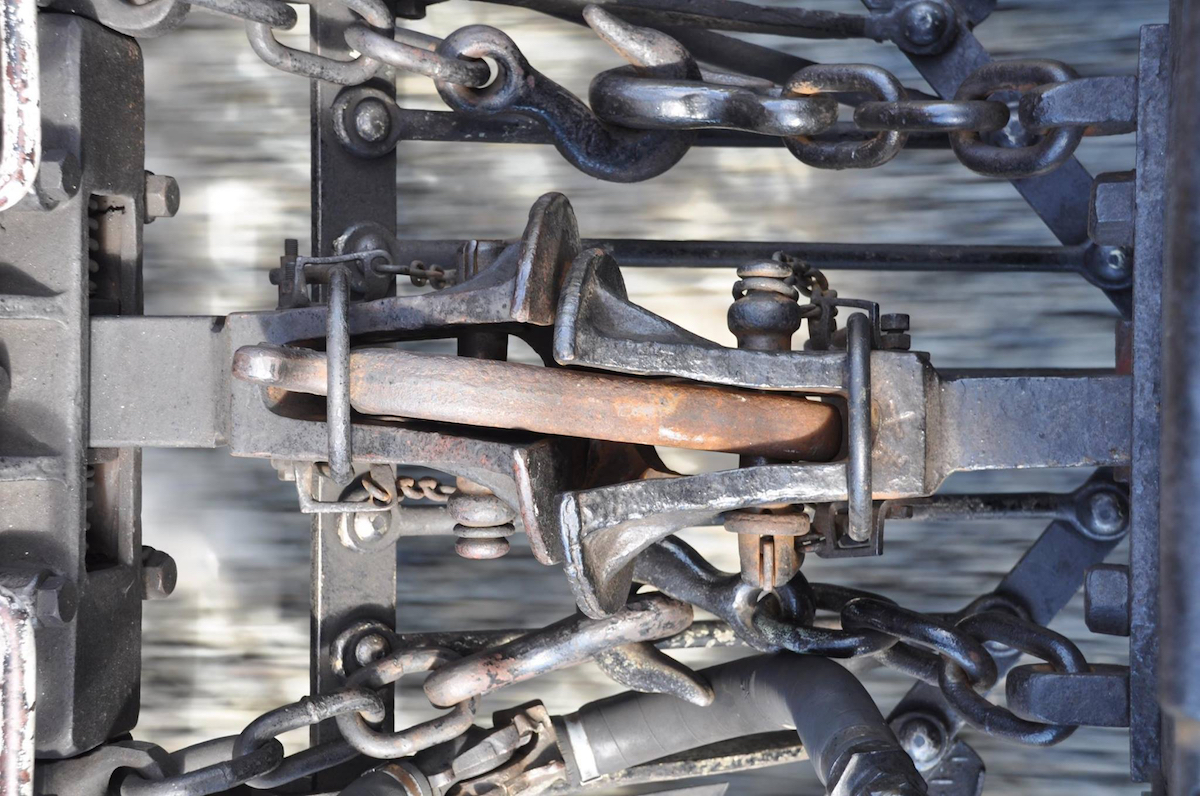
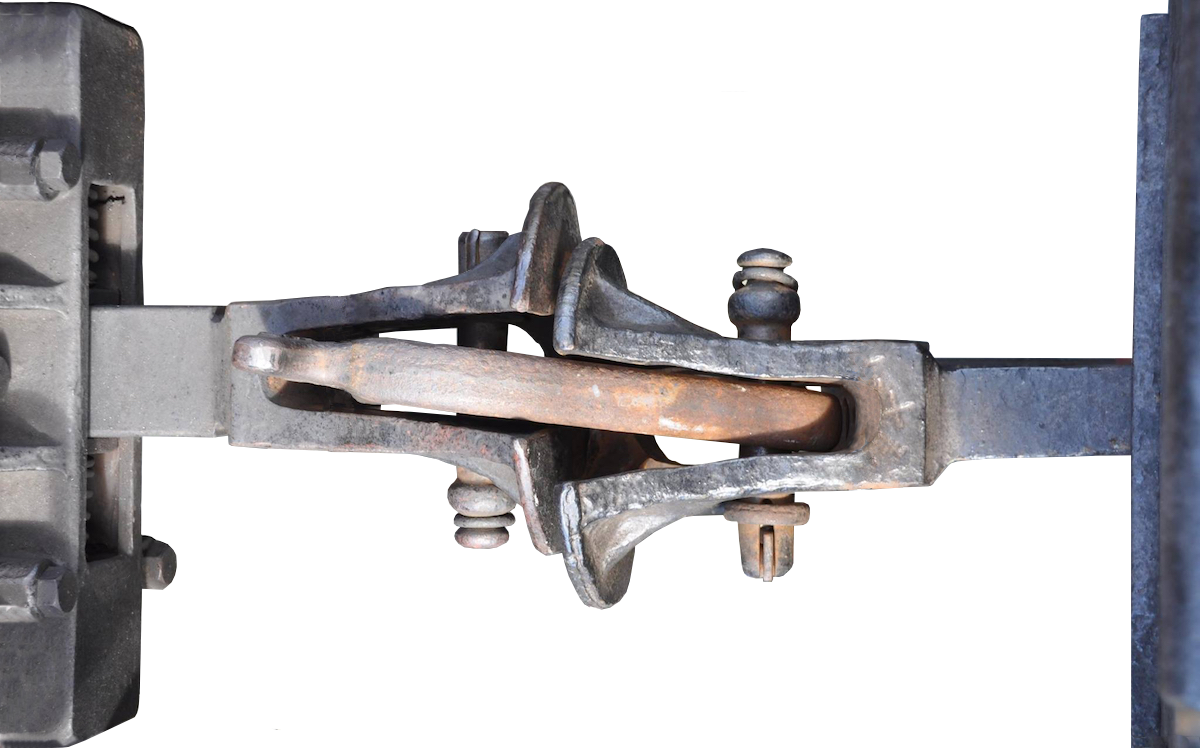

A Norwegian coupling or coupler (also known colloquially as a chopper coupling or claw hammer coupling), is a manually operated coupling at each end of some narrow-gauge railway rolling stock. It consists of a central buffer incorporating a hook that drops into a slot in the opposing central buffer. The system is only found on narrow gauge railways with a gauge of 1067 mm (3 ft 6 in) or less on which low speeds and train loads allow a simpler system than, for example, knuckle couplers. Norwegian couplings are not particularly strong, and may be supplemented by auxiliary chains. Not all Norwegian couplings are compatible with one another since they vary in height and width. Some may permit a hook from both rail vehicles to be in place; others may be limited to one.

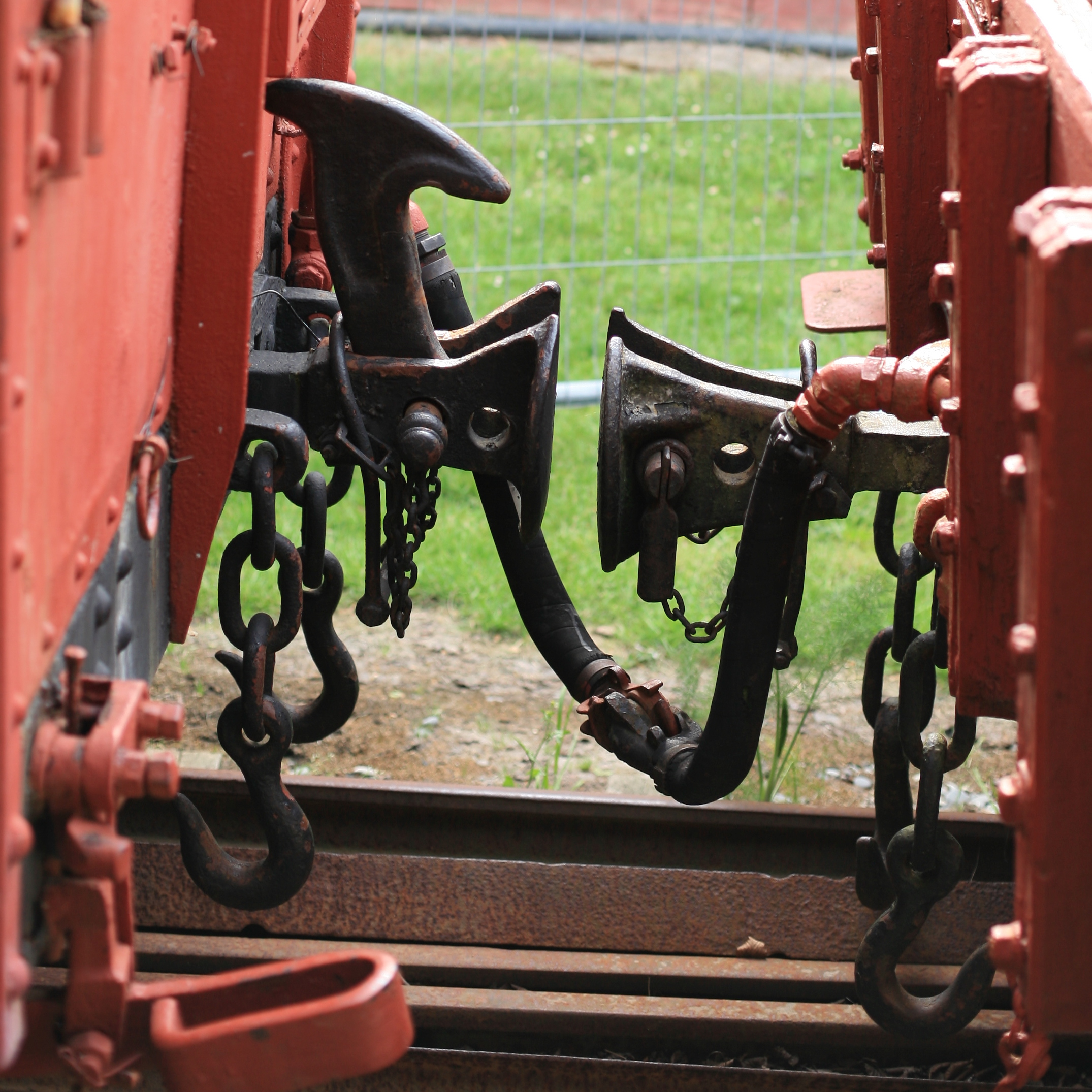
Norwegian couplings on preserved New Zealand freight wagons

The Norwegian coupling was developed in Norway about 1870, when the main railway network was built to 1067 mm (3 ft 6 in) narrow gauge. During the 20th century, these lines were rebuilt to 1435 mm (4 ft 8 1/2 in) standard gauge or closed. Since the rolling stock needed to be replaced, a change was made to buffers and chain couplers. Nowadays they can be seen only at museum railways, such as the Setesdal Line and Urskog–Høland Line.

During the 1970s the New Zealand Government Railways developed a large, heavy-duty version of the Norwegian coupler, which was first applied to a fleet of diesel-electric locomotives from the United States fitted with knuckle couplers for North Island Main Trunk express freight trains. However, the knuckle couplers were replaced with heavy-duty Norwegian couplers to increase their availability for other routes. Since then, Norwegian couplers have largely been replaced with knuckle couplers.

In Australia, Norwegian couplers were used on 1067 mm (3 ft 6 in) lines: Queensland Government Railways, Western Australian Government Railways and the Midand Railway, and most of the narrow-gauge lines of the South Australian Railways. Vehicles of the latter now operate at the Pichi Richi Railway, which has retained the Norwegian couplers.

On railway lines where rolling stock always points the same way, the mechanical hook may be provided only on one end of each wagon. This was the situation on the Lynton and Barnstaple Railway, a narrow gauge line in Devon, England, and still applies on the Isle of Man Railway. Similarly, the hand brake handles may also be on one side of the wagons only. The Lynton and Barnstaple Railway originally used side chains in conjunction with Norwegian couplers, but they were eventually found to be unnecessary with the slow speeds prevailing (15–25 km/h or 9–16 mph) and were removed within a year or so of the line opening in 1898. The Isle of Man Railway still connects its side chains in operation.

Kenyan railways, Uganda Railways, Tanzanian Railways and Mountain Railways of India use the Norwegian coupler. In Indonesia, Staatsspoorwegen (today Indonesian Railway Company) rolling stock used Norwegian couplings for its 1067 mm (3 ft 6 in) rolling stock.

== Gallery ==
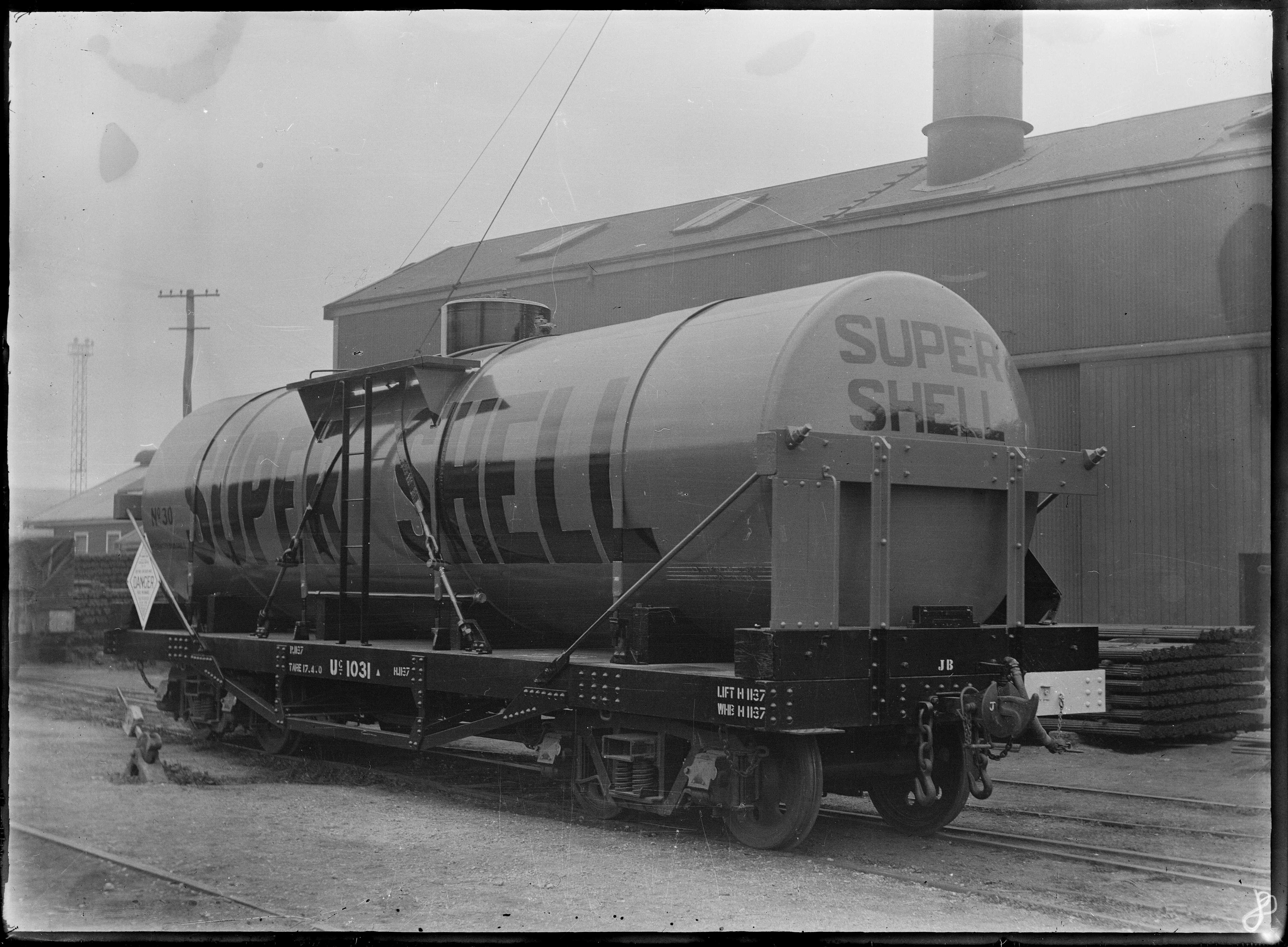
Norwegian Couplers
on New Zealand tank wagon

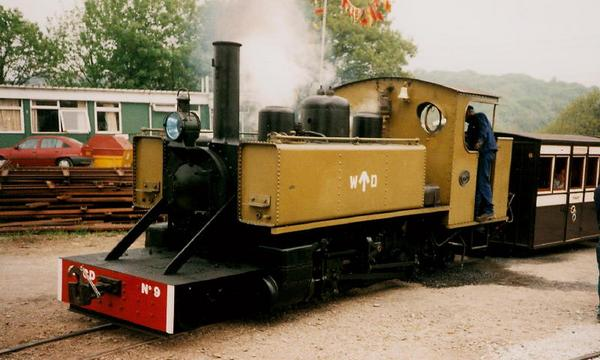
Norwegian Couplers
on ALCo Ex-WDLR FDLR Loco

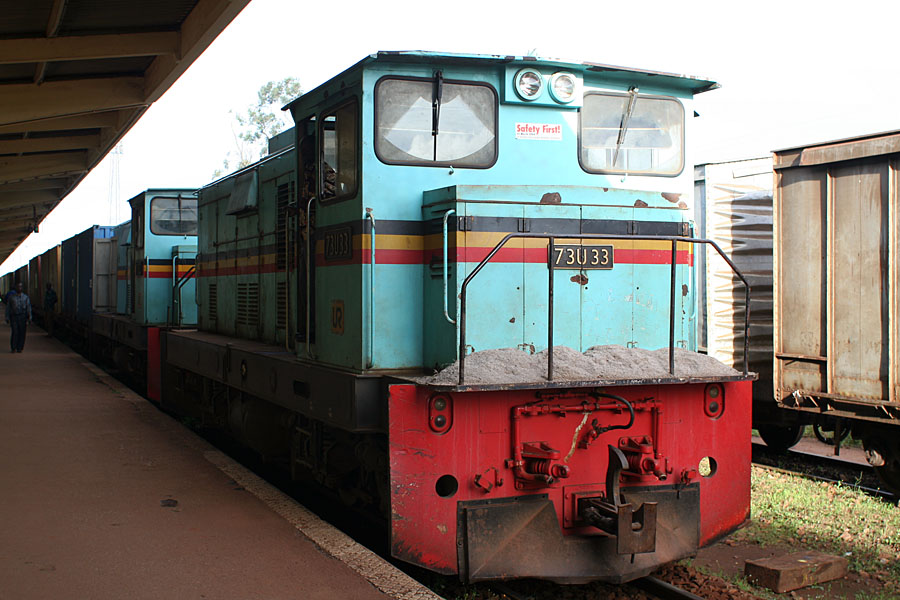
Norwegian Couplers
on Uganda Loco

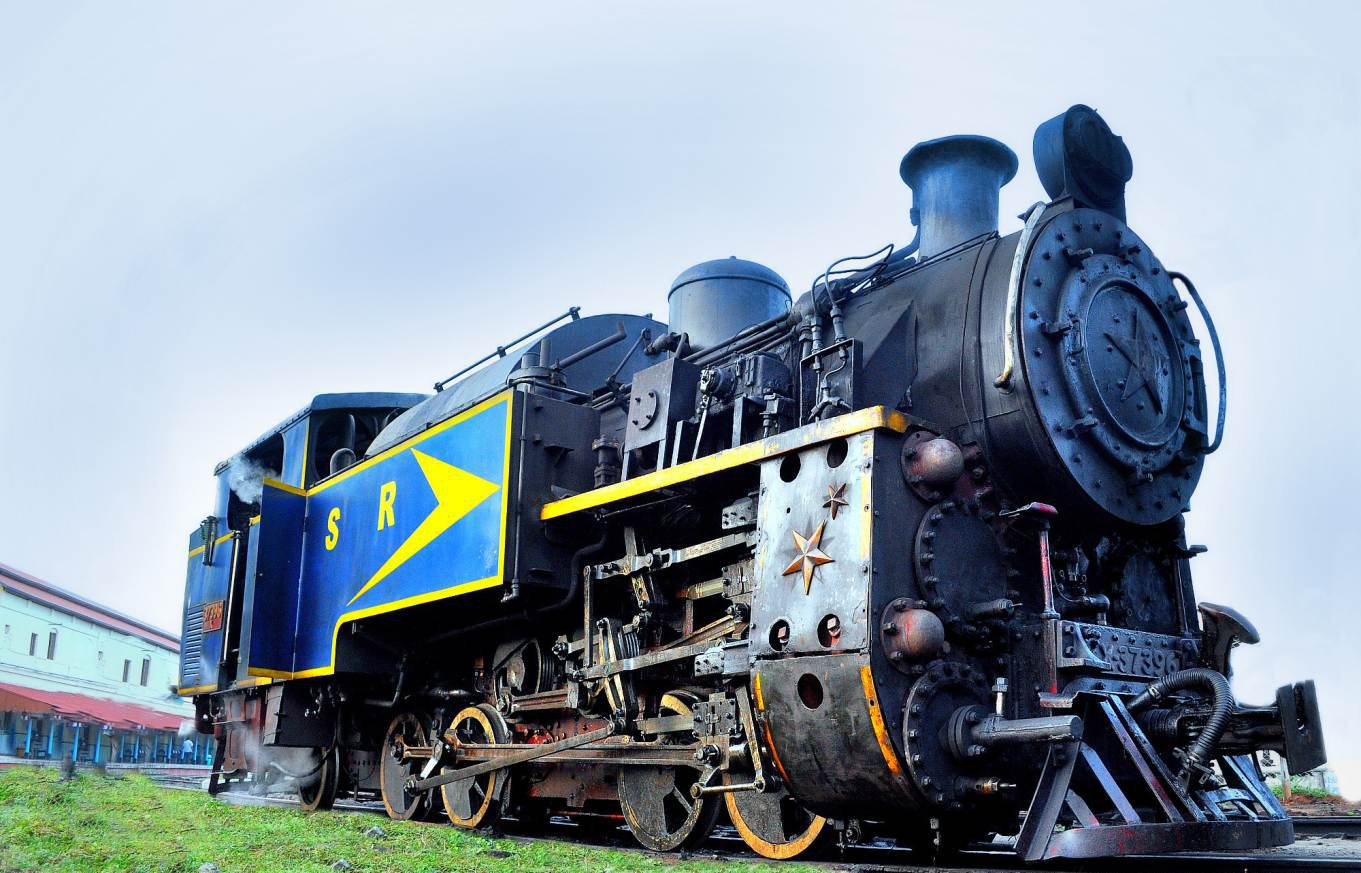
Norwegian Couplers
on India Loco

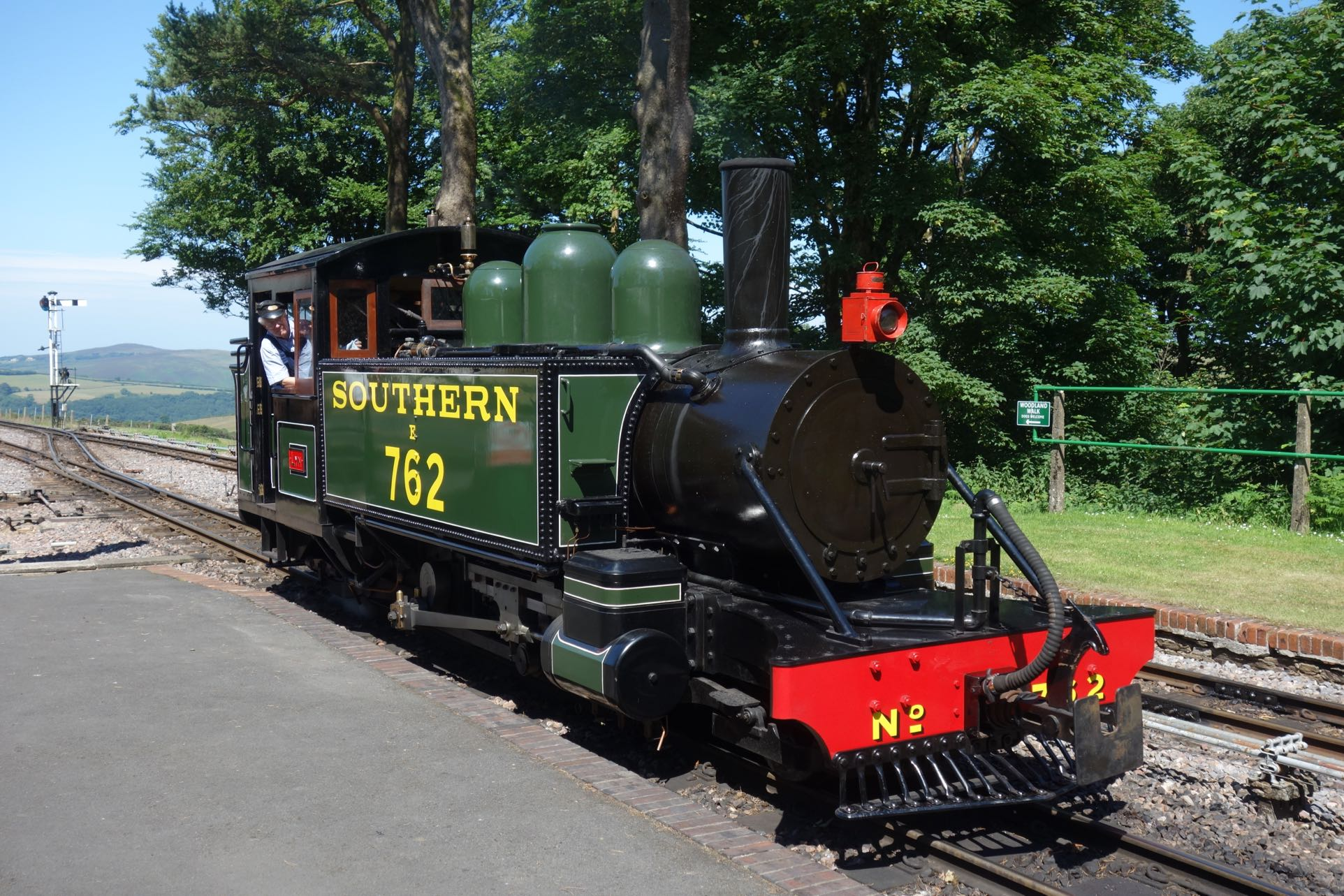
Replica Baldwin loco "Lyn" with Norwegian couplers

== See also ==
- Bell-and-hook coupler
- Draft gear
- Nilgiri Mountain Railway
- Railway coupling by country
