= History of rail transport in Togo =

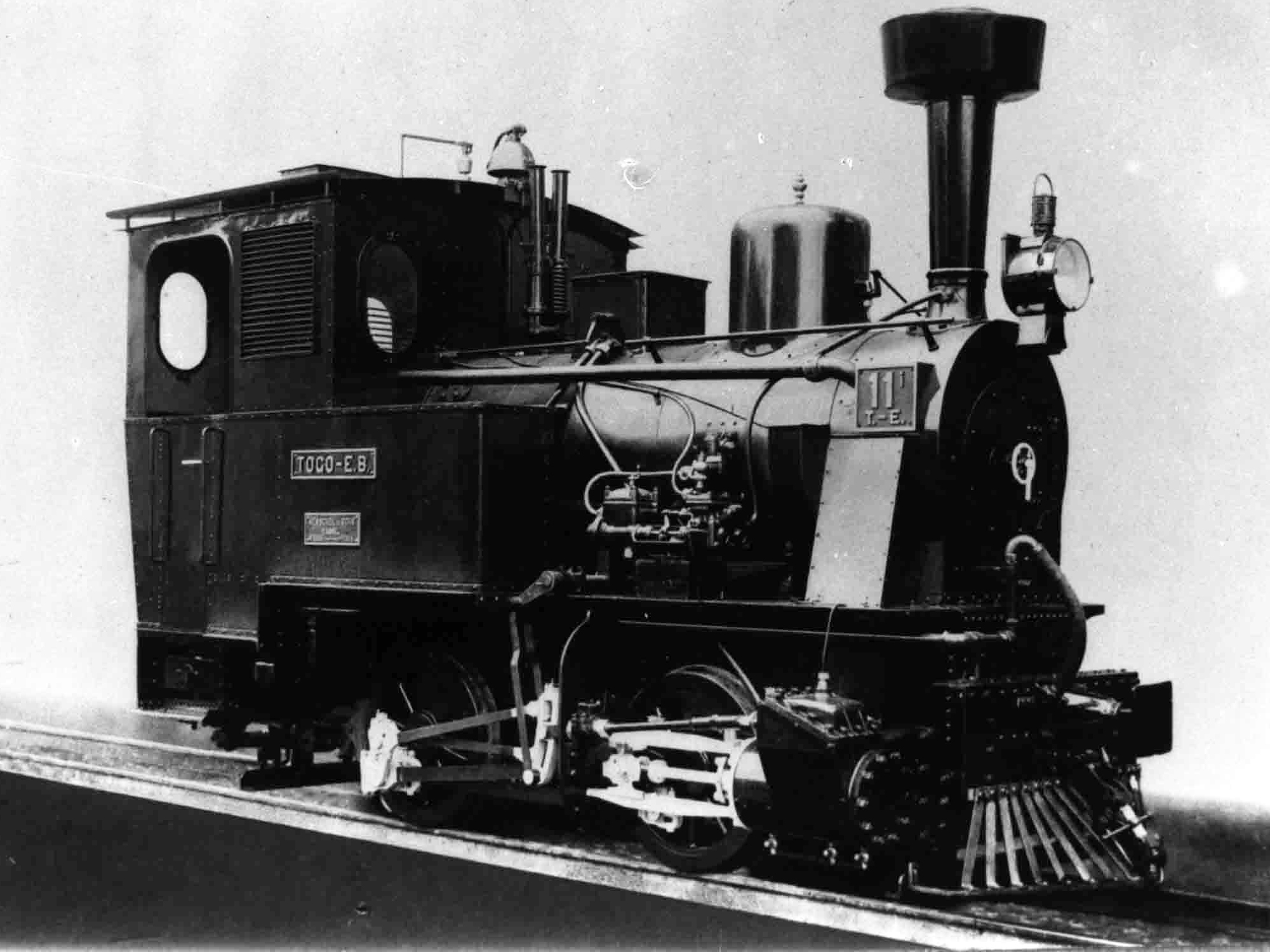
A 600 mm (1 ft 11 5/8 in) gauge tank locomotive made by Henschel and used in Togo, 1904

Rail transport in Togo began in 1905.

== German colonial period ==
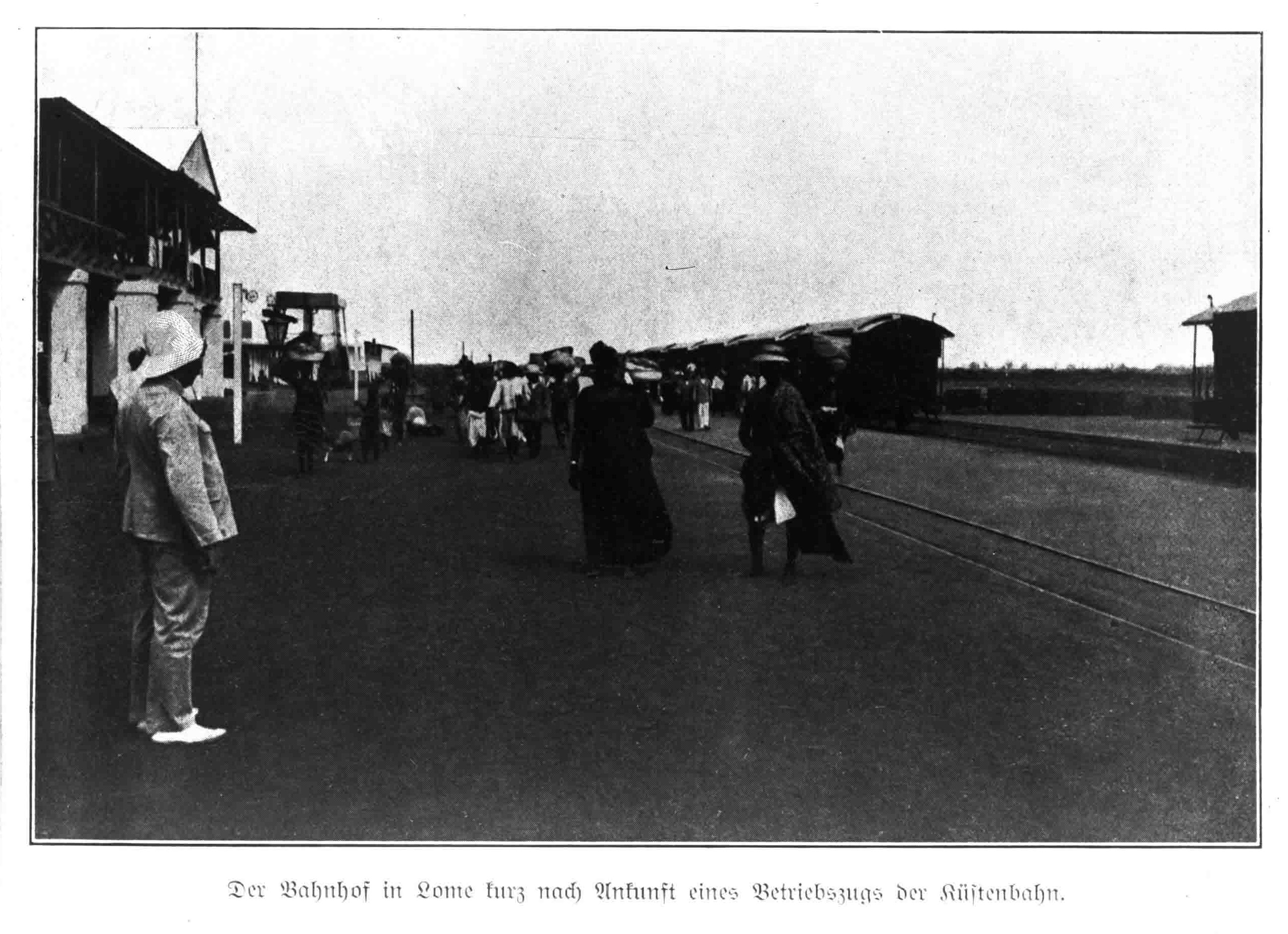
Lomé station during the German colonial period

The basics of the rail network in Togo were laid during the German colonial period. The lines built in the then German Togo (Togoland) served mainly to facilitate the export of agricultural products.

The 44 km (27 mi) long Lomé–Aného railway was the first to be built in Togoland. It went into service in 1905. The 1,000 mm (3 ft 3 3/8 in) metre gauge used for that line set the standard for future Togo railway construction.

On 27 January 1907, the birthday of Kaiser Wilhelm II, Togo's second railway, the 119 km (74 mi) long line from Lomé to Kpalimé, was opened.

The protectorate's third line, between Lomé and Atakpamé, was constructed from 1908, and completed to its full length of 167 km (104 mi) in 1913. It branched off the Lomé–Kpalimé railway at a point 2.7 km (1.7 mi) from Lomé, and was the only line in Togo to be extended during the subsequent French mandate.

At the end of the German colonial period, Togo had a 327 km (203 mi) long rail network. Its rail vehicle fleet consisted of 18 tank locomotives, 20 passenger coaches and 202 goods wagons.

As the rail network at that time was laid out in the shape of a star focused on Lomé, its assets were able to be used very economically, with vehicle maintenance centralized at Lomé in a main workshop.

The operating personnel, including the mechanics, were mainly indigenous, and were predominantly Ewe people. The train drivers, however, were always German, and the operating language was German. The staff consisted of 768 locals and 26 Europeans.

== French mandate ==
After World War I, Togo was divided between the United Kingdom and France, in the ratio of 1:2 . The entire rail network was in the part of the territory that was to be administered by France from then onwards, under a League of Nations mandate.

During the post war period of military occupation, which lasted until 1922, the rail network was run under the name Togoland Military Railway (TMR). Train operation was in the hands of the neighboring railway of the Gold Coast, the Gold Coast Government Railways. For that reason, new rolling stock procured at that time was sourced mainly from the British Empire. Only after 1922 did the rail network receive its French language name: Chemins de fer du Togo (CFT).

As Togo was "only" a mandated territory that had not permanently secured its international legal assignment to France, the French colonial authorities held back on making investments in Togolese railways. Only in the 1930s did France resume development of the railway network it had taken over from the Germans. In 1934, the 113 km (70 mi) long extension of the Lomé–Atakpamé railway to Blitta was opened. However, the planned further extension to Sokodé was abandoned due to lack of funds, even though its construction had already begun.

In 1946, Togo became a United Nations Trust Territory. Simultaneously, the CFE procured new locomotives, which were the last steam engines to join the fleet. By 1964, trains on the network were being hauled solely by diesel locomotives. However, the old German colonial era coaches remained in use for passenger operations at least as late as the 1970s.

== Republic of Togo ==
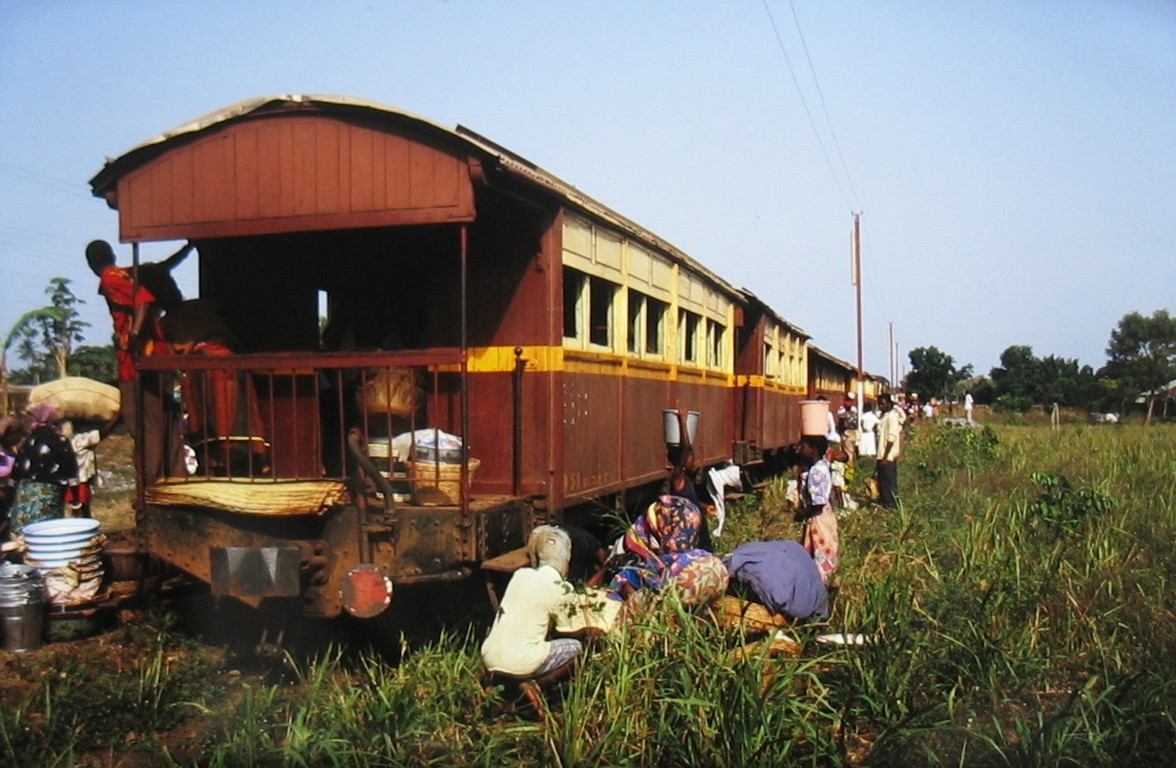
A Lomé–Kpalimé passenger train at an intermediate station, 1990

Togo became independent in 1960. Under the influence of a variety of romantic commentaries about Togo's rail and colonial legends, a perception has developed that the newly independent Togo inherited a functioning rail network from the German colonial period, and that that network has since been ruined. Yet the truth is that at independence the Togolese rail vehicle fleet was obsolete.

The newly independent Togo procured new passenger carrying railcars from Renault and de Dietrich, and a single railcar from Soulé, as a reaction to the existing competition from road transport. Even so, as early as the 1960s there were proposals for the total abandonment of Togo's rail network.

Since 1961, a 22 km (14 mi) long, private metre gauge line has served to link the phosphate mine at Hahotoe north of Lake Togo operated by Compagnie Togolaise des Mines du Bénin (CTMB) until 2007, and by Société Nouvelle des Phosphates du Togo (SNPT) since then, to a jetty on the coast at Kpémé. It is one of the two sub-networks that are still in operation today.

In 1970, the station building at Lomé station was rebuilt. The German colonial era goods and locomotive sheds, however, were left almost unchanged.

The last expansion of the network occurred in 1971, with the opening of a new line to Tabligbo branching in an easterly direction off the Lomé–Blitta railway at Togblékové. According to one source, that branch line is still in operation, but an earlier source claims that the branch was closed and lifted before the end of the 1970s. The branch was constructed to carry raw materials for cement production.

As of about 1980, the railway network in Togo was operated by 20 diesel locomotives, ten railcars, sixty passenger cars and 375 wagons. At that time, approximately 1.5 million passengers and 112,000 long tons (114,000 t) of freight were carried on the network annually.

In 1985, the line from Lomé to Aného was decommissioned east of the junction with the main line. In 1999, the Lomé-Kpalimé line, and the main line from Lomé to Blita, including the Agbonou–Atakpamé branch, were closed from the point 19 km north of Lomé. There have been conflicting reports as to the state of the remaining network since then.

== See also ==
- History of Togo
- Rail transport in Togo
