= Rail transport in Ghana =

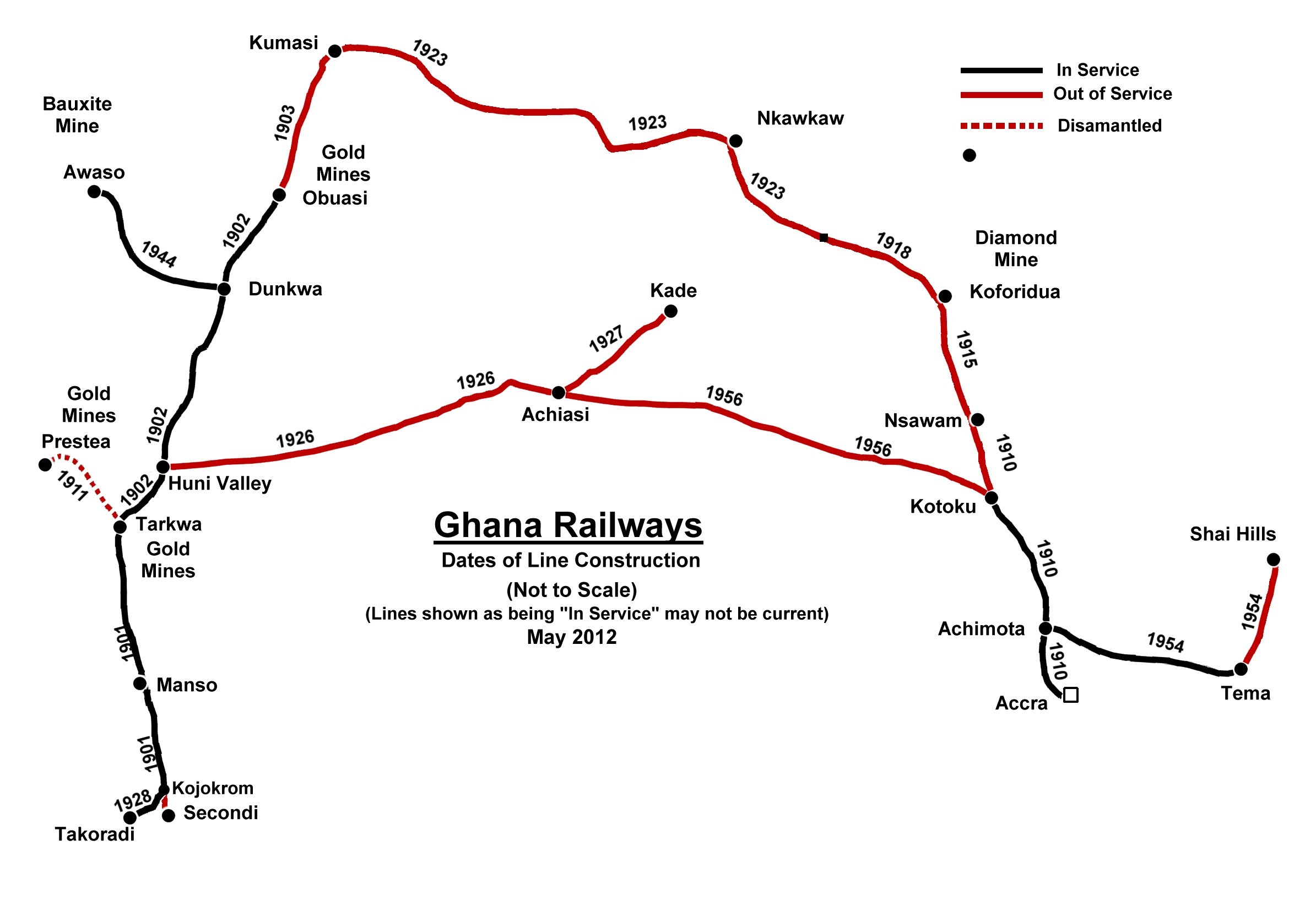
Railway network of Ghana

The railway system in Ghana has historically been confined to the plains south of the barrier range of mountains north of the city of Kumasi. However, the 1,067 mm (3 ft 6 in) narrow gauge railway, totalling 1,300 kilometres, is undergoing major rehabilitation and inroads to the interior are now being made. In Ghana, most of the lines are single tracked, and in 1997, it was estimated that 32 kilometres were double tracked.

There are no rail links of the main system with adjoining countries. However, the Lomé—Aflao line of the Togo rail system is partly located in Ghana. There are also plans to extend the Kumasi-Takoradi railway to Paga, by the Burkina Faso border, plus a branch from Tamale to Yendi.

== Railway network In Ghana ==
The Railway network in Ghana as historically constructed partly by British Colonial Rule comprised three lines which when combined formed an "A" shape. The three lines are as follows.

The new railways in Ghana are partly Dual Gauge (1435mm & 1067mm), particularly those near the built up areas near the coast.

=== The Western Railway Line ===
The Western Railway Line was the first railway line constructed from Kumasi to Sekondi and then later extended to Takoradi.

=== The Eastern Railway Line ===
The Eastern Railway Line, also known as the Cocoa Line, was the second railway line constructed from Kumasi to Accra.

=== The Central Railway Line ===
The Central Railway Line is a railway line that connects the Eastern Line at Adjen Kotoku to the Western Railway line at Huni Valley to make it possible to travel by train from Accra to Takoradi via rail without going through Kumasi.

=== The Tema-Mpakadan Railway Line ===
The Tema-Mpakadan railway line is a 96.7 km standard gauge railway constructed to connect the Harbour in Tema to Mpakadan, a town in the Eastern Region of Ghana. Construction commenced in July 2018, and the line was officially inaugurated on 25 November 2024 by President Nana Addo Dankwa Akufo-Addo.

This railway line is a critical component of Ghana's transportation infrastructure and forms the first phase of the 1,200 km Ghana-Burkina Faso Railway Interconnectivity Project, designed to enhance trade and economic integration between the two countries.

The project was financed through a $447 million credit facility from the India Exim Bank and executed by Afcons Infrastructure Limited. These investments funded substantial infrastructural improvements and complex engineering tasks, such as the construction of a 300-metre bridge over the Volta River. To complement the railway line, two Diesel Multiple Unit (DMU) trains were procured at a cost of $4.2 million to enhance passenger transportation along the corridor.

This railway line is also integrated into Ghana's broader multimodal transport system, combining rail, road, and inland water transport, thereby boosting connectivity and reducing transit times for goods and passengers.

== Timeline ==
=== 2020 ===
Several SGR are under construction, including

- a line from Tema, via Ho and Tamale to Ouagadougou, the capital of Burkina Faso. This line is called the Ghana Burkina Faso Interconnectivity Project. This project began with the phase one construction of the Tema-Mpakadan Railway Line, which runs from the Tema Harbour to the Inland fishing harbour at Akosombo.
- a concrete sleeper plant at Hemi.

=== 2022 ===
- On 31 August 2022, an agreement was announced to upgrade the 299 km Western Railway line to 1,435 mm (4 ft 8+1/2 in), to be operated by Ghana Railway Co and Thelo DB will as rail manager for the US$3·2bn project.

=== 2024 ===
- Procurement of two Diesel Multiple Unit passenger trains from Polish rolling stock manufacturer, PESA.
- Collision between train and mini truck parked on the line during a test run. The driver was sentenced to 6 months in jail with damage estimated to cost US$2.1 million.
- Representatives from the ECOWAS Member States, regional organizations, and development partners convened in Accra, Ghana, from May 9 to May 10, 2024, with the objective is to analyze the railway aspect of the ECOWAS Regional Infrastructure Master Plan (RIMP) and ensure the coordination of railway infrastructure advancements across the ECOWAS region.

== See also ==
- Railway stations in Ghana
