= 2012 Stuttgart derailments =

Series of railway incidents in Germany

During 2012, three trains derailed at Stuttgart Hauptbahnhof, Germany, all nearly at the same place and for nearly the same reasons. Nobody was injured during the first derailment on 24 July. The second accident on 29 September caused injuries, high material damages and a major train service disruption. The third accident on 9 October happened when an empty train was used for tests during the investigation.

== Background ==
Stuttgart Hbf is a terminus railway station, except for S-Bahn (commuter rail) trains and underground trams. It is to be replaced by an underground through station, called Stuttgart 21, a much-debated project that is already under construction. To make room for the construction site, the platforms had to be moved away from the current station building. This required the points area to be moved to confined space, too. Construction activity and infrastructure changes are still happening.

All the trains mentioned here were push–pull trains and consisted of eleven passenger cars (including one control car) and a trailing, pushing electric locomotive. All vehicles with German traditional coupling must pass force (here: tractive effort) either by the coupling (pulling force) or the buffers (pushing force). A pushing engine must not exceed certain force levels (that depend on points, curves, train length, mass and vehicle types), or the train may be distorted, e.g. pushed outwards in a curve. In extreme cases as these, derailment may happen.

== Derailments ==
=== First ===
On 24 July 2012, IC 2312 departed from track 10. It consisted of one leading Steuerwagen (Control car), nine more passenger cars, a dining car (last car) and a trailing DB Class 101 electric locomotive to push the train. The engine and the two cars next to it derailed.

Construction work to rectify distortions on the tracks was about to begin after the train's departure. The 40 km/h speed restriction, as commanded by signal aspect Hp 2, was respected, 29 km/h were reached.

In addition to findings that affected all trains (see below), the driver has been blamed for accelerating the train too fast, so the force applied throughout the sequence of buffers was too large (191 kN instead of the 150 kN limit). Nobody was injured. The damage was determined as €370,000. Three tracks of the station had to be closed.

=== Second ===
On 29 September 2012, IC 2312 departed from track 10 (same as above). It consisted of one leading control car, seven more passenger cars, one dining car, two other passenger cars and a trailing DB Class 101 engine. The speed limit of 40 km/h (on signal Hp 2) was fully utilized. The engine and the three adjacent cars derailed.

The train took down two catenary support masts, thus tearing down part of the catenary, which had then to be switched off. The tracks also had to be closed for the rescue to begin, and both actions separated the entire station from the network for hours. Several tracks were reopened on the same day, allowing to return to service, but many long distance trains had to bypass the station on this day. Eight persons received minor injuries. The damage was determined as €6,482,000.

=== Third ===
On 9 October 2012, three test runs were initiated in addition to software-based simulations to support the investigation, and indeed, the last try reproduced the derailments. The train resembled that of the second accident in type and sequence. The last three cars (those in front of the engine) derailed. The tests were meant to prove that track 10 and the following points were safe to be used, but the opposite happened. Again, long distance trains had to be rerouted.

== Aftermath ==
The accidents' immediate cause was determined: The exceptional length of the type of dining car used and the position of its bogies resulted in a greater horizontal buffer misalignment than the other car types. It lacked buffers that were broad enough to handle this offset, so buffers slipped past each other and jammed, preventing the required lateral movement. The report recommended reviewing the buffers used and replacing them if necessary.

The track layout was shown to have some deficiencies regarding the sequence of curves, specifically straight elements inside S-curves. The combination of track elements within a small area had taken them to the allowable limits, increasing wear and reducing stability. The report discussed different layouts. Also, track distortions and wear had been found before the first accident, but had not been rectified, or had not been recognized due to errors.
