= Lomé–Blitta railway =

Railway line in Togo

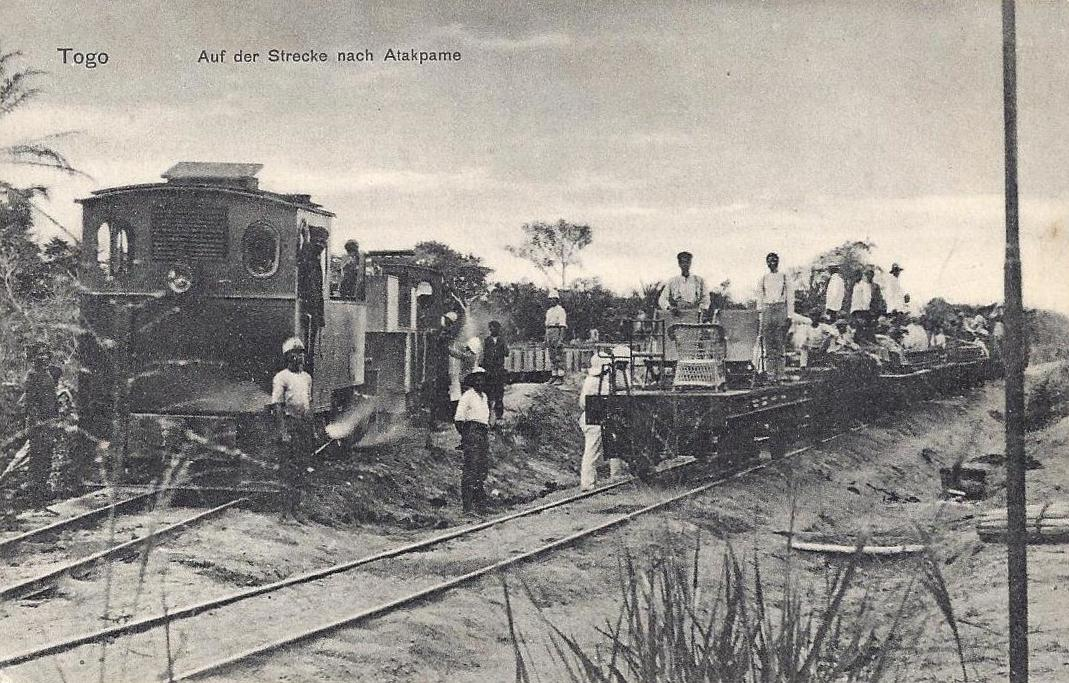
- On the line to Atakpamé

Overview
- Locale: Togo

History
- Opened: 1913

Technical
- Track gauge: 1,000 mm (3 ft 3 3/8 in) metre gauge

The Lomé–Blitta railway was the third railway line built in today's Togo. It was also called Hinterlandbahn (hinterland railway) or Baumwoll-Bahn (cotton railway).

== History ==
The railway line was built from 1908 during the German colonial era, in order to develop cotton growing areas. Several rivers had to be crossed, which led to a series of up and down gradients in the route and bridge constructions. The 163 km long section to Agbonou was completed in April 1911. The remaining section to Atakpame opened on 2 May 1913.

As a terminus, the line used the station at Lomé, which was initially built for the Lomé–Aného railway. The line branches off from the Lomé–Kpalimé railway at km 2.7. Construction and operation was assigned to the Deutsche Kolonial-Eisenbahn Bau- und Betriebsgesellschaft (German colonial railway construction and operation company; DKEBBG), which operated the railway in Togo under the legal name of Togo-Eisenbahn (Togo railway; TE). It had to pay a rent of 523,000 marks annually to the colonial tax administration. The Kamina Funkstation, 12 km south-east of the city, had its own 600 mm gauge field railway connection to the station at Agbonou. It was intended to lengthen the railway, if possible to Banjeli, in order to develop the hematite ore deposits there, but that did not happen because of the start of the First World War.

During the period of military occupation until 1922, the railway was operated under the Togoland Military Railway (TMR) name, with operations handled by Gold Coast Government Railways, the railway of the neighboring Gold Coast. Togo was split between the United Kingdom and France after the First World War, with the whole railway network located in the part of the country now administered by France under a League of Nations mandate. Only then, in 1922, the railway received its French name Chemins de fer de Togo (CFT).

The French colonial power continued to expand the railway line beginning in the 1930s. From Agbonou on the Lomé–Atakpame railway, a 113 km long line to Blitta was opened in 1934. Further construction to Sokodé had been started, but was stopped due to a lack of funds. A connection to railway lines in French West Africa, considered in the 1950s, was also not realized.

The line continued to operate as the main line of the railway network in Togo, even after Togo gained independence.

The section from Agbonou to Atakpame has since been closed. A 58 km long branch line was opened in 1979, linking Togblekovhe and Tabligbo. The branch line, closed from 1984 until 1990, handles clinker transport. After the withdrawal of passenger services between Lomé and Blitta in mid-1998, and their reinstatement in November 1998, a mixed train runs to Blitta on Saturdays, with the return service running on Sundays.

== See also ==
- Rail transport in Togo
