= Lomé–Aného railway =

Former railway line in Togo

Overview
- Locale: Maritime Region, Togo

History
- Opened: 18 July 1905
- Closed: 1985

Technical
- Line length: 44 km
- Track gauge: 1,000 mm (3 ft 3 3/8 in) metre gauge
- Minimum radius: 300 m

The Lomé–Aného railway was the first railway in the German protectorate of Togoland. Over a length of 44 kilometers, it connected the administrative center of Lomé with the coastal town of Aného. Colloquially, the coastal railway was also called Kokosnussbahn (coconut railway) – coconut trees grew on the dunes between the beach and the lagoon; oil palm products were often transport goods.

== Transport before the construction of the rail line ==
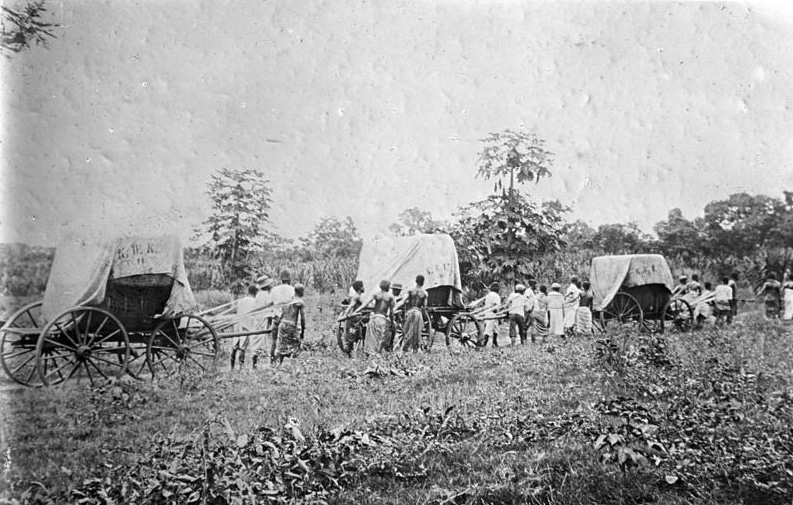
Cotton transport in Togo, ca. 1900

Draft animals were seldom used in south Togo, as the Surra-epizootic spread there. Due to the absence of natural harbors and because of the dangerous breakers, coastal shipping was little developed. Transport was only carried out by boats on the inland waters near the coast and by carriers. Even when the German colonialists introduced wagons after the seizure of the country in 1884, many of them were pulled by Africans with their muscle power.

== Planning ==
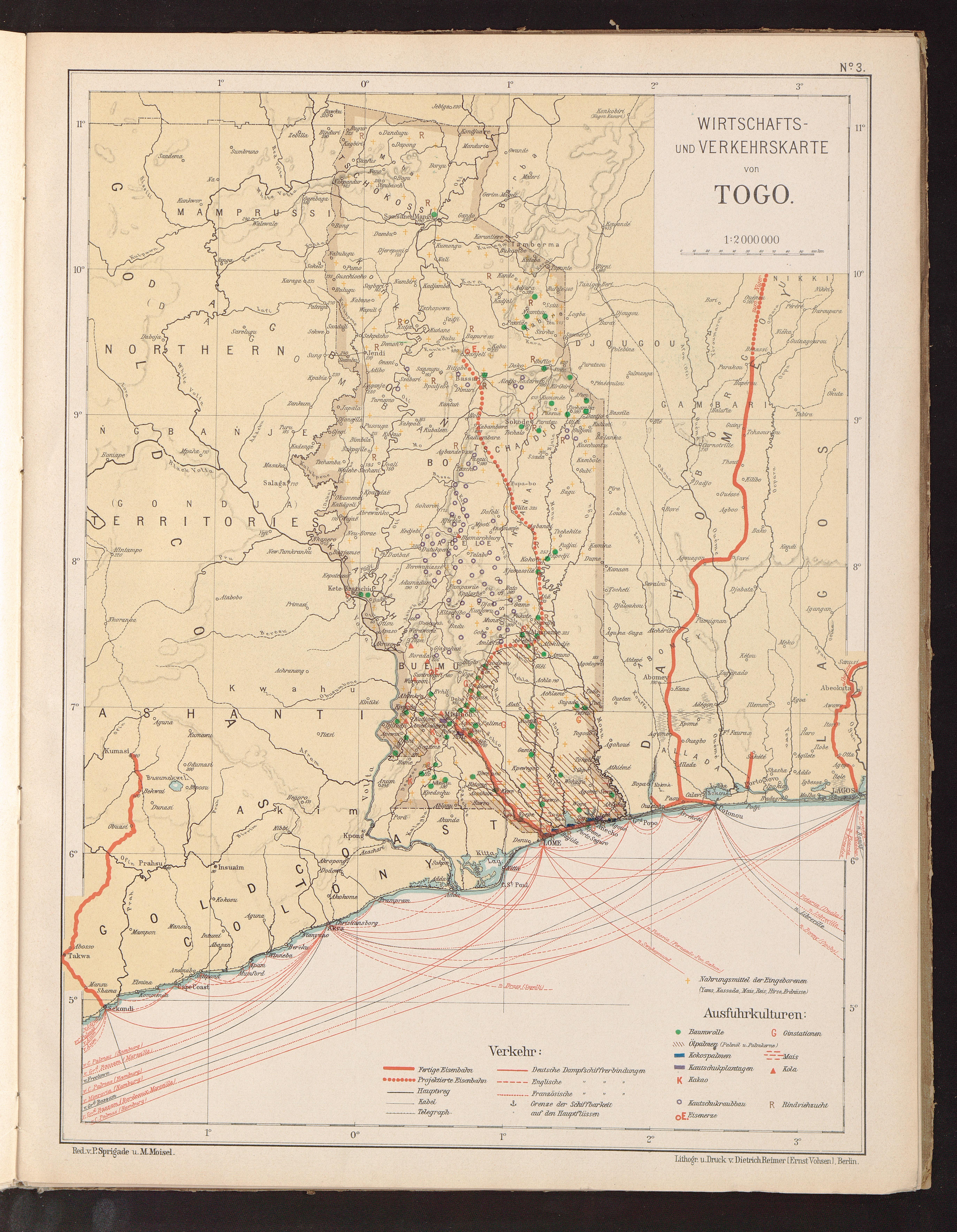
Economic and transport map of Togo, 1906

The construction of the pier in Lome 1900–1904, should provide the country with a safe landing for ships from overseas. At the same time all customs formalities could be concentrated there. The existing roadstead in Anecho (formerly Klein-Popo) should be closed. To compensate, a railway connection should be built between Lomé and Aného, with which the goods traffic that previously took place in Aného could easily be transferred to Lomé. The alignment was primarily in line with the economic interests of European merchants, but also partially compensated for Anecho's impending loss of importance. The route followed the shortest route along the coast. Another reason for the chosen alignment could have been the influence of the Pflanzungsgesellschaft Kpeme, which operated a plantation in Kpeme and an agricultural farm in Baguida. Like this, it was avoided to traverse the actual main area of origin of the export products northeast of the Lake Togo.

== Construction ==
=== Implementation ===
Construction of the railway line began in early March 1904. Construction materials could only be unloaded safely after the completion of the pier. The construction work was entrusted to the Vereinigte Maschinenfabrik Augsburg und der Maschinenbaugesellschaft Nürnberg (MAN), Gustavsburg branch. Technically, the construction was rather modest; groundwork and engineering structures were barely necessary. 1.12 million Mark were approved for the construction. The cost was around 23.000 Mark per kilometer of rail. Thus, the amount granted was nearly sufficient. The initially planned track gauge of 750 mm was changed to meter gauge shortly before the start of construction work.

=== Working conditions ===
Almost exclusively Africans were used as workers, which – compared with similar work in the neighboring colonies - received low wages. Generally, indigenous workers received a daily wage of 50 Pfennig for the railway construction, with an additional 25 Pfennig as subsistence allowance. In the neighboring Gold Coast colony, daily wages of the equivalent of two Mark were common. Many workers were only active in the railway construction until they had earned their annual tax sum of six Mark. Therefore, the colonial leadership increasingly resorted to the means of forced labor to ensure sufficient workers for the railway construction. "Pflichtarbeiter" (compulsory workers) received the same wages as voluntary workers, but were forcefully conscripted for half a year. Illnesses and deaths were particularly high among the compulsory labor force. Reasons were the unusual climate, food and workload for compulsory workers from other parts of the country.

== Operation ==
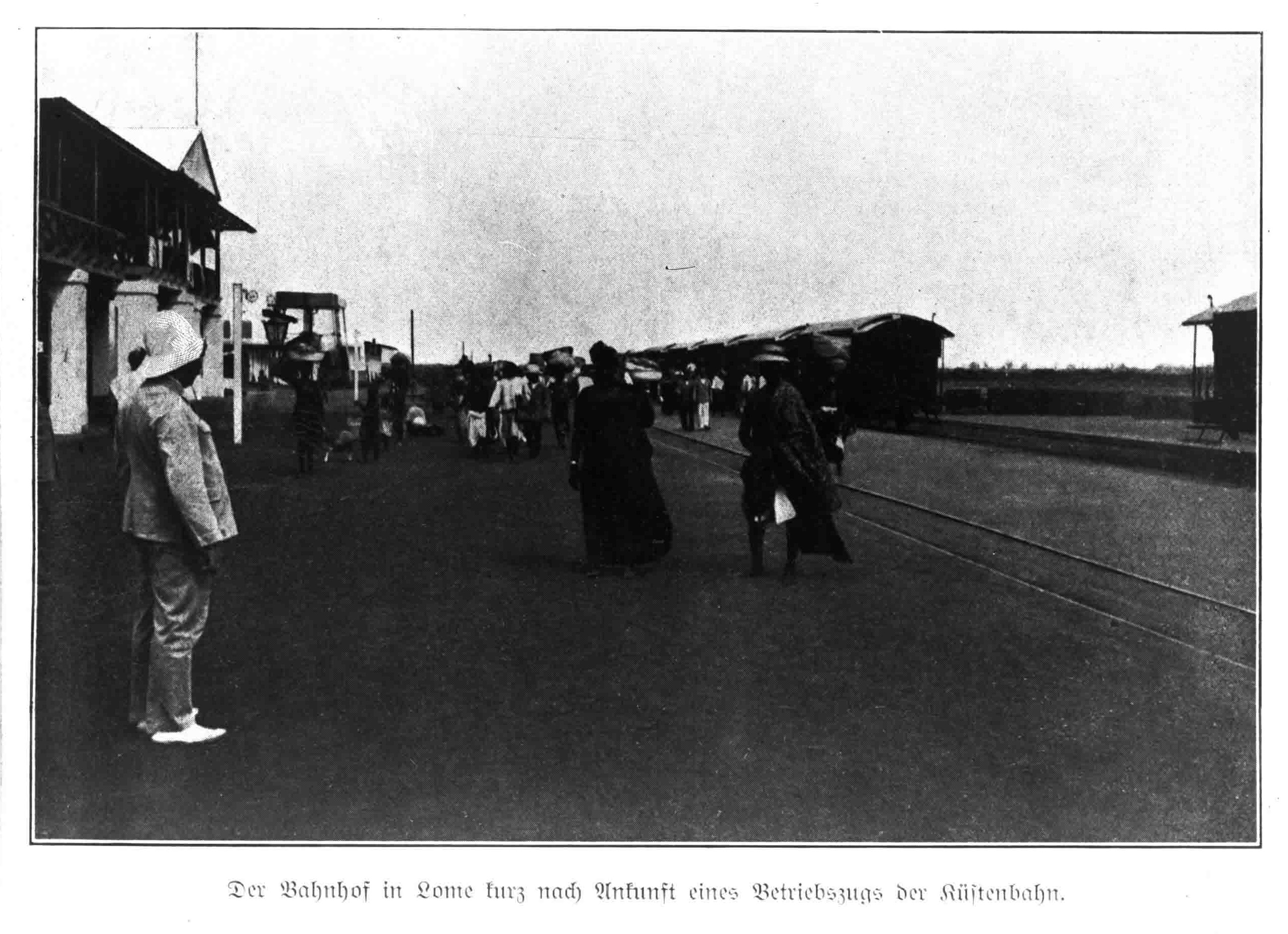
The station in Lomé shortly after the arrival of a company train

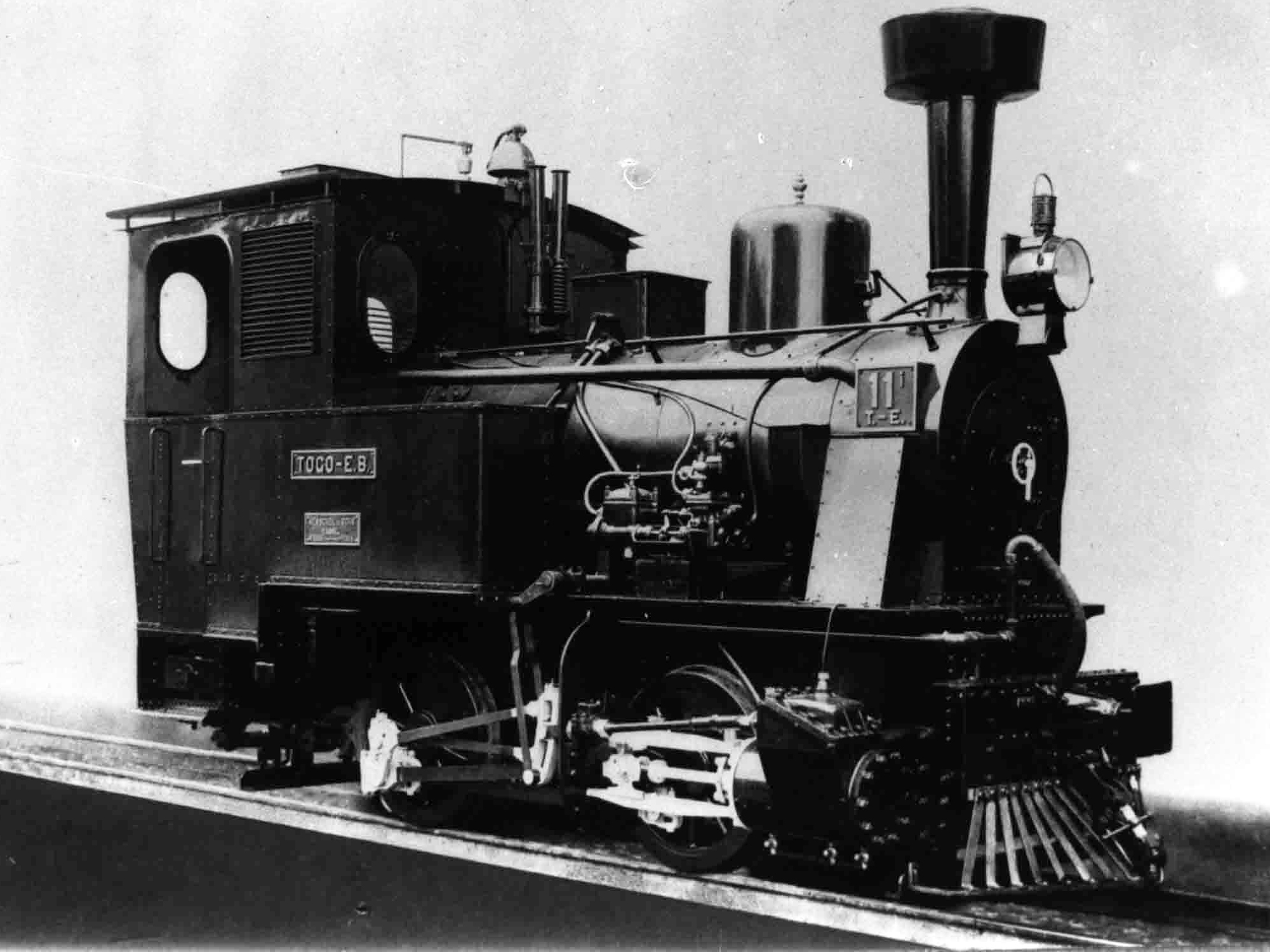
Locomotive of the Togo coast railway (TE Nr. 11), built by Henschel, 1904

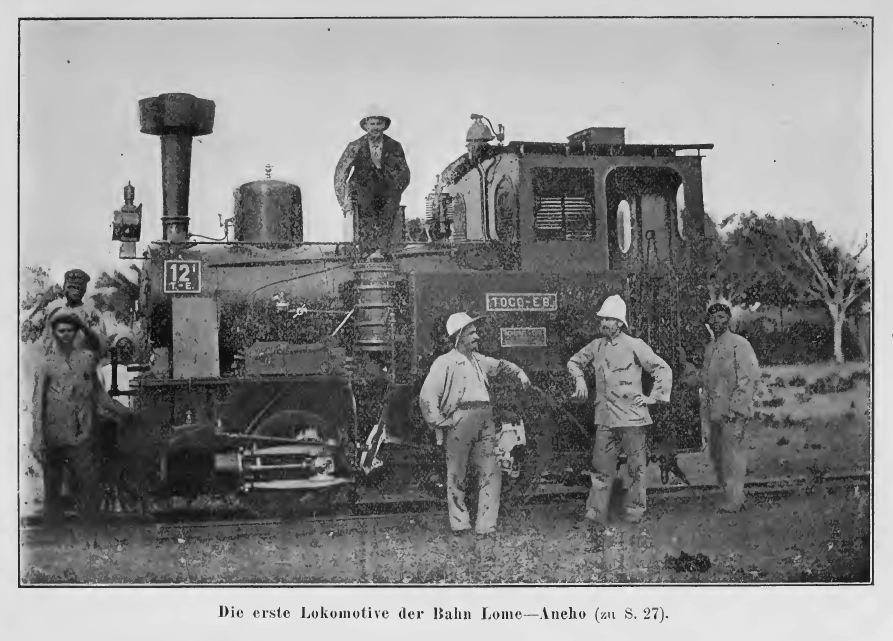
The other one of the two tank locomotives: TE Nr. 12

=== Traffic ===
The coast railway was opened on 18 July 1905. On the same say, the roadstead in Aného was closed for merchant shipping. Railway operation was initially taken over by Baugesellschaft m.b.H. Lenz & Co. from Berlin. On 1 April 1908, operation was leased to the Deutsche Kolonialeisenbahn-Bau- und Betriebs-Gesellschaft from Berlin for twelve years.

In the palm groves of the coast and the fertile hinterland of Anecho, copra, corn and palm kernels were the main freight goods.

Despite the railway line being built primarily for goods transport, there was soon a surge of African passengers, which already traveled on work trains. However, a timetable for public passenger transport was only introduced from 15 May 1906. A pair of trains ran every working day and covered the route in one hour and 50 minutes. Until 1914, about 38,000 to 40,000 people per year travelled on the coastal railway between Lomé and its eastern catchment area. The average distance travelled by one person was 33.2 kilometers. The boarding at the rural stops was considerable.

=== Operational buildings and fleet ===
Noteworthy operational buildings existed almost only at Lomé station, from which the two other railway lines built later also started, the Lomé–Kpalimé railway and the Lomé–Blitta railway. Warehouses and locomotive sheds located in Lomé are still used today. There were also a turntable, water towers and workshops. The station building in Lomé had two storeys. The stations on the line, like at Porto Seguro (today Agbodrafo), were mostly simple, single-storey waiting rooms.

Initially, two type Bn2T tank locomotives were used, which were delivered from Henschel in 1904 (serial numbers 6885 and 6886). The freight cars and third class cars were mostly delivered from Beuchelt & Co.. First and second class cars were built by Waggonfabrik Uerdingen and MAN. The third class passenger cars consisted merely of empty covered goods wagons – called Aimahu, "land canoe", by the Africans. Simple wagons remained predominant in the following years. At the end of 1912 the Togo-Eisenbahn (Togo railway; TE) had over 20 passenger-, post- and luggage-cars and 174 freight cars.

== Development after the First World War ==
At the beginning of August 1914, the First World War led to slight damages of railway line, which were quickly fixed by the invading French troops. In the first years after the takeover by the British-French associations, the railways of Togo were operated by the neighboring Gold Coast Government Railways. After the end of the First World War the railway line was taken over by the mandate administration of French Togoland. The termini of the coast railway were renamed to Lomé and Aného.

As a mandate holder, France was reluctant to invest in the railways because the return of the area could not be ruled out. An initially planned parallel line from Tsévié to Tokpli, about 50 kilometers north of Aného, was not realized. The integration into a continuous railway network of French West Africa, the Regié des Chemins de Fer de l'Afrique Occidentale Française (RCFAOF), was also not realized.

After Togo gained its independence in 1960, the railways were promptly and completely switched from steam- to diesel locomotive traction. The German car fleet was continued to operate for a long time. Old, German two- and four-axle cars were still to be found during the 1970s. At that time, four pairs of trains ran daily on the coastal railway, which took just over 80 minutes to travel the 44 kilometers.

Lomé station was rebuilt in 1970. The warehouses and locomotive sheds from the German colonial period remained almost unchanged.

The line to Aného was shut down in 1985. Today, most parts of it have been dismantled.

Still, since 1961, a 22 kilometer long private meter-gauge line is located at Kpeme, handling phosphate-transport for Société Nouvelle des Phosphates du Togo (SNPT) from its mine at Hahotoe north of Lake Togo to a pier on the coast.

== See also ==
- Rail transport in Togo
