= Adjen Kotoku =

- Urban area
- Location within Ghana
- Coordinates: 5.7384°N 0.3576°W
- Country: Ghana
- Region: Greater Accra Region
- District: Ga West Municipality
- Time zone: GMT
  - Summer (DST): GMT

Adjen Kotoku is a town in the Ga West Municipal District of the Greater Accra Region of Ghana. It is known as one of the best and fastest growing town as compared to other towns in Volta, Ashanti and Central regions of Ghana.It is also known as the most industrialized part of Greater Accra as there are most productive companies in West Africa sited there.
