= Western Railway Line, Ghana =

Railway line from Takoradi to Kumasi

Overview
- Status: Open
- Termini: Takoradi; Kumasi
- Connecting lines: Dunkwa to Awaso Kojokrom to Sekondi

Service
- Operator(s): Ghana Railway Company Limited

History
- Commenced: 1898
- Completed: 1903

Technical
- Track gauge: narrow gauge

The Western Railway Line is a narrow gauge single track railway line from Takoradi Port to Kumasi, with branch lines at Kojokrom, which leads to Sekondi and another at Dunkwa, which leads to Awaso.

== History ==
The Western Railway Line is the first railway line built in Ghana and was constructed in 1898 and completed in 1903. Takoradi was chosen for the line instead of the Elmina due to the failure in negotiations with the owners of the castle. Also Takoradi was a shorter route to Tarkwa, which had just discovered gold.

It was not until in late 1895 that plans for the first locomotive railroad in the Gold Coast Colony germinated under the leadership of Joseph Chamberlain, who had made the development of Britain's tropical Crown colonies one of the cornerstones of his tenure as Secretary of State for the Colonies.

=== Construction ===
The western railway line was constructed over three phases.

==== Phase One - Sekondi to Tarkwa ====
The first phase of construction began in 1898 from Sekondi to the gold-mining town of Tarkwa. Before the Sekondi-Kumase line was half completed, numerous experts had pointed out basic flaws of design and construction.

== Encroachment and Illegal Mining ==
The activities of illegal miners in the Western Region has led to the destruction of portions of the line. This led to the arrest of 12 individuals who appeared before the Tarkwa Circuit Court on October 7th, 2025.
