= Eastern Railway Line, Ghana =

Railway line from Accra to Kumasi, Ghana

The Eastern Railway Line is a 300 km (190 mi) narrow gauge railway line from Accra Station to Kumasi, with a branch line from Achimota Railway Station to Tema.

== History ==
The Eastern Railway Line, sometimes referred to as the cocoa line, was built in three phases.

The first phase, from Accra to Mangoase, was started in 1908 opened in 1912. The line from Accra reached Tafo in 1918 before it eventually reached Kumasi in the 1923. Unlike the Western line which took 6 years to build, the Eastern line took 15 years due to shortage from war.
