= Lomé–Kpalimé railway =

Railway line in Togo

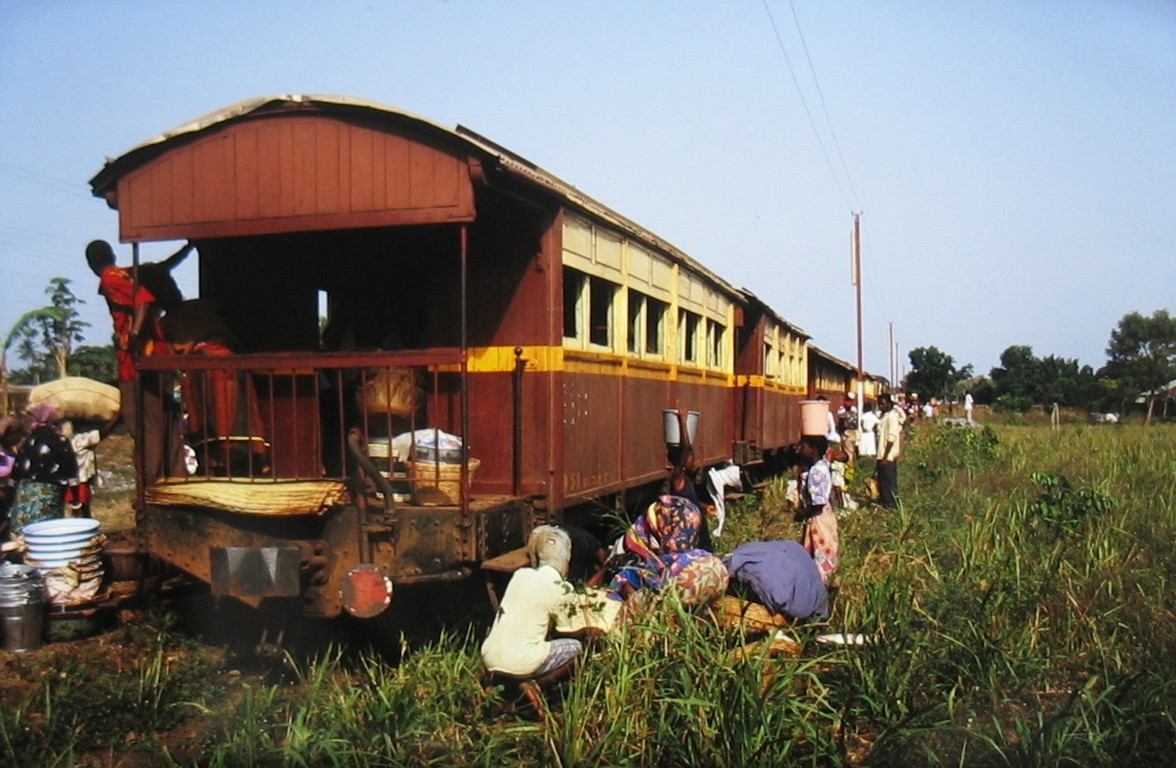
- Train on the line in February 1990

Overview
- Locale: Togo

History
- Opened: 1907

Technical
- Line length: 119 km (74 mi)
- Track gauge: 1,000 mm (3 ft 3 3/8 in) metre gauge
- Minimum radius: 200 m (660 ft)

The Lomé–Kpalimé railway was the second railway line built in today's Togo. It was also called Inlandbahn or Kakao-Bahn (cocoa railway).

== History ==
The railway line was built during the German colonial era. Planning started in 1902, and construction began in 1904. Construction was financed through a 7.8 million Mark loan to the protectorate, with an interest rate of 3.5%. The german company Maschinenfabrik Augsburg-Nürnberg was entrusted with the construction and the operation left to Lenz & Co. Noepe was reached in 1905; Kpalimé was reached in 1907. The line opened on 27 January 1907, the birthday of Wilhelm II. It was built in meter gauge, had a length of 119 km (74 mi) and was accompanied by a telephone line. The level crossings were equipped with signals to ring bells. The line used the station at Lomé of the Lomé–Aného railway as a terminus. Besides the transport of cocoa, the line also served as transportation method for oil palm products. From 1 April 1908, both lines were leased to the Deutsche Kolonial-Eisenbahn Bau- und Betriebsgesellschaft (German colonial railway construction- and operation company; DKEBBG), which operated through trains running over both lines.

Togo was split between the United Kingdom and France after the First World War, with the whole railway network located in the part of the country now handled by France as a League of Nations mandate. During the period of military occupation until 1922, the railway was operated under the Togoland Military Railway (TMR) name, with operations handled by Gold Coast Government Railways, the railway of the neighboring Gold Coast. Only then, from 1922, the railway received its French name Chemins de fer de Togo (CFT).

Since it was only a mandate area whose allocation to France under international law did not appear to be permanently secured, France also held back with investments in the railways in Togo. The line continued to operate after Togo gained independence.

== See also ==
- Rail transport in Togo
