= Rail transport in Togo =

Map showing railway lines in Togo

Rail transport in Togo consists of 568 km (353 mi) (2014) of 1,000 mm (3 ft 3 3/8 in) metre gauge railway.

== Operators ==
Trains are operated by Société Nationale des Chemins de Fer Togolais (SNCT), which was established as a result of the restructuring and renaming of Réseau des Chemins de Fer du Togo from 1997 to 1998. Between Hahotoé and the port of Kpémé, the Compagnie Togolaise des Mines du Bénin (CTMB) operated phosphate trains.

== Lines ==
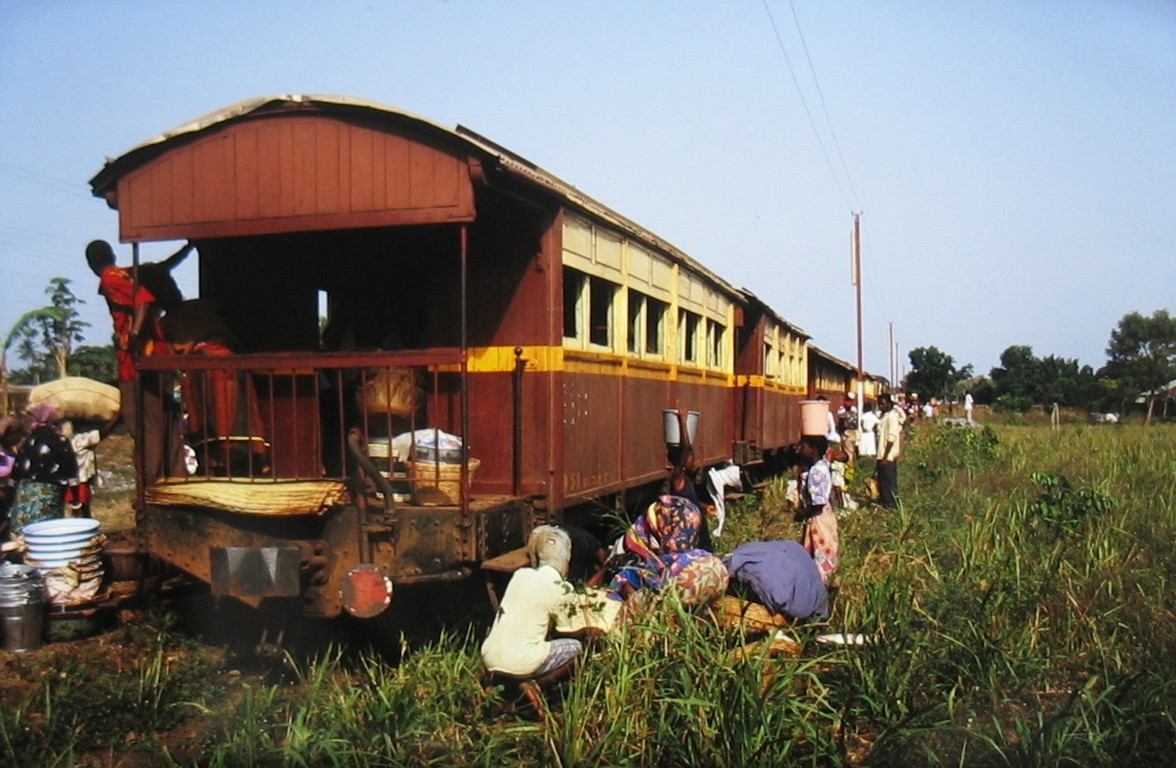
Togo train from Lomé to Kpalimé at an intermediate station in 1990

- Lomé–Aného railway
- Lomé–Blitta railway to be extended to Sahel Railway
- Lomé–Kpalimé railway
- Hahotoé–Kpémé railway (operated by CTMB)
- * The above lines are proposed to be converted to 1435mm gauge to match Sahel Railway
- Lomé–Aflao railway

== Towns served by rail ==
- Lomé - port and national capital
- Blitta - terminus of the Lomé–Blitta railway

== Railway links with adjacent countries ==
- Burkina Faso - no - same 1,000 mm (3 ft 3 3/8 in) metre gauge gauge
- Benin - no - same 1,000 mm (3 ft 3 3/8 in) gauge
- Ghana - no - break-of-gauge 1,000 mm (3 ft 3 3/8 in) / 1,067 mm (3 ft 6 in).

== Standards ==
- Coupling – Centre buffer and two side chains
- Brakes – Vacuum brake
- Maximum speed – up to 35 km/h

== History ==
- Construction of the first railway line in Togo, the Lomé–Aného railway, began in 1904.
- In 1980, the average distance travelled by one person was 50 kilometers.
- A siding across the border from a cement plant in Aflao, Ghana, to the port of Lomé was completed in 2014.

=== Proposed international lines ===
Togo is a participant in the AfricaRail project, an Indian proposal has surfaced to link the railways in Benin and Togo with landlocked Niger and Burkina Faso. In May 2023, a plan was agreed upon by the transport ministers of Togo, Ivory Coast, Burkina Faso, Niger, and Benin, to further international railway connections. The plan, consisting of both upgrading and building new lines, would link Lomé to the planned network.

== See also ==
- Transport in Togo
