= 5 ft 3 in gauge railway =

Railway track gauge (1600 mm)

Railways with a track gauge of 5 ft 3 in (1,600 mm) fall within the category of broad-gauge railways. As of 2026, they were extant in Australia, Brazil and on the island of Ireland.

== History ==
600 BC
The Diolkos (Δίολκος) across the Isthmus of Corinth in Greece – a grooved paved trackway – was constructed with an average gauge of 5 ft 3 in (1,600 mm).
1840
The Grand Duchy of Baden State Railway was constructed in 1840–1851 to 5 ft 3 in (1,600 mm) gauge before being converted to 4 ft 8 1/2 in (1,435 mm) in 1854–1855.
1843
The Board of Trade of the United Kingdom of Great Britain and Ireland, after investigating a dispute caused by diverse gauges, recommended the use of 5 ft 3 in (1,600 mm) in Ireland.
1846
The Railway Regulation (Gauge) Act 1846 made 5 ft 3 in (1,600 mm) mandatory throughout all of Ireland.
1847
The Swiss Northern Railway was opened as a 5 ft 3 in (1,600 mm) line and converted to 4 ft 8 1/2 in (1,435 mm) in 1854.
1854
The first Australian railway to operate steam-powered freight and passenger services, Melbourne and Hobson's Bay Railway Company, was built as a 5 ft 3 in (1600 mm) line.
1858
The first Brazilian 5 ft 3 in (1,600 mm) railway was opened: the Companhia de Estrada de Ferro Dom Pedro II.
1863
The Canterbury Railway in New Zealand was built in 5 ft 3 in (1,600 mm). It was converted to 3 ft 6 in (1,067 mm) in 1876.

== Nomenclature ==
- In Great Britain and Ireland, the gauge is known as Irish gauge. In Ireland it is also common to hear it referred to as standard gauge or broad gauge when distinguishing it from the various 3 ft narrow-gauge railways of the island.
- In Australia, where the states of Victoria and South Australia have this gauge (as did Tasmania in the 19th century), it is known as broad gauge.
- In Brazil, the gauge is mainly known as broad gauge (Portuguese: bitola larga), but occasionally as Irish gauge (Portuguese: bitola irlandesa).

== Installations ==
| Country/region | Railway |
|---|---|
| Australia | Main articles: Rail transport in South Australia and Rail transport in Victoria Currently, the suburban rail networks in Adelaide, Melbourne, and most regional lines in Victoria (including three lines that cross the border into New South Wales) use 5 ft 3 in (1,600 mm). The 828 km (514 mi) long Melbourne–Adelaide rail corridor linking South Australia and Victoria, and some associated branch lines, was converted to standard gauge in 1995. The final 200 km (120 mi) section of the North East line, Victoria and the 125 km (78 mi) long Oaklands railway line, which runs into New South Wales from Victoria, were converted to standard gauge in 2008–2010. The Mildura and Murrayville railway lines were converted to standard gauge in 2018. |
| Brazil | Main article: Rail transport in Brazil Lines connecting the states of Rio de Janeiro, São Paulo and Minas Gerais; E.F.Carajás in Pará and Maranhão states, and Ferronorte in Mato Grosso and Mato Grosso do Sul states. Used in older Metro systems. Although the metre-gauge network is almost five times longer, Irish gauge is considered the standard by ABNT. The current network is 4,057 km or 2,521 mi, 15% of the total Brazilian network. |
| Germany | Grand Duchy of Baden State Railway 1840–1855 |
| Ireland | Main article: Rail transport in Ireland Following proposed projects of the Ulster Railway and Dublin and Drogheda Railway companies (using 6 ft 2 in (1,880 mm) and 5 ft 2 in (1,575 mm), respectively), and existing issues of competing gauges in Great Britain, in 1843 the Board of Trade (with the advice of engineers Charles Pasley and George Stephenson) introduced the gauge as a compromise. The Railway Regulation (Gauge) Act 1846 was passed to formalise the gauge used on the island of Ireland to 5 feet 3 inches (1600mm). As of 2013 the network totals over 2,730 km or 1,700 mi (2,400 km or 1,490 mi in the Republic of Ireland, and 330 km or 210 mi in Northern Ireland). |
| New Zealand | Canterbury Railways from 1863; all were routes converted to 3 ft 6 in (1,067 mm) by 1876. |
| Switzerland | Swiss Northern Railway between 1847 and 1854, converted to 1,435 mm (4 ft 8 1/2 in) standard gauge. The 330 m (360 yd) long Fun'Ambule funicular in Neuchâtel, opened 27 April 2001. |
| United States | Altoona and Logan Valley Electric Railway |

== Similar gauges ==
The Pennsylvania trolley gauges of 5 ft 2 1/2 in (1,588 mm) and 5 ft 2 1/4 in (1,581 mm) are similar to this gauge, but incompatible. There is also a 5 ft 2 in (1,575 mm) gauge. See: Track gauge in Ireland.

== Locomotives ==
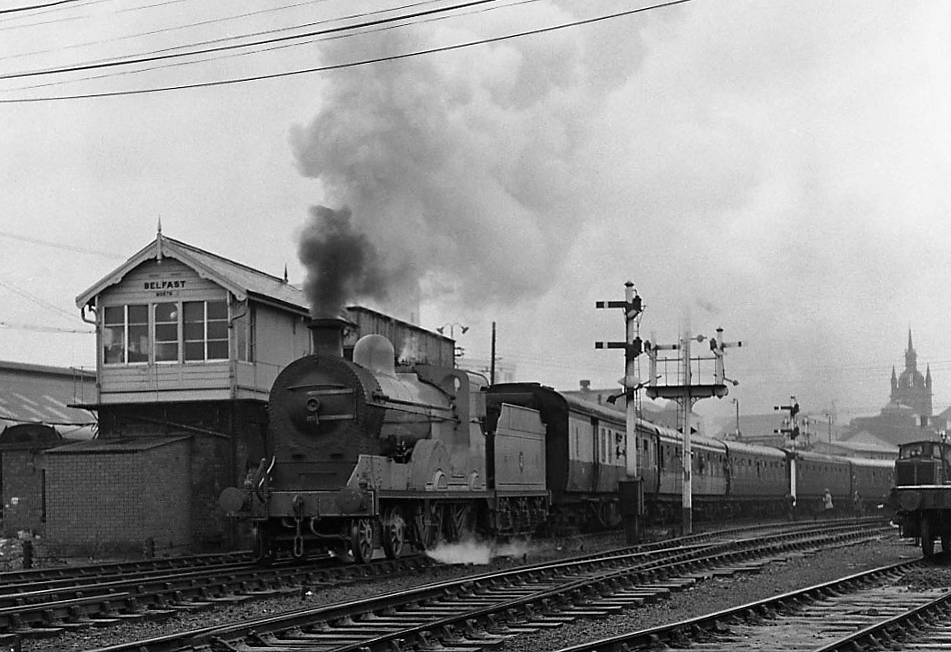
RPSI Steam train leaving Great Victoria Street station, 1975

Before the advent of diesel and electric traction, one of the advantages of the broader 5 ft 3 in (1,600 mm) Irish gauge compared to 4 ft 8 1/2 in (1,435 mm) was that more space between steam locomotive frames allows for a bigger firebox, enabling generation of more steam.

== See also ==
- History of rail transport in Australia
- History of rail transport in Brazil
- History of rail transport in Ireland
- Rail transport in Australia
- Rail transport in Brazil
- Rail transport in Ireland
- Track gauge in Australia
- Track gauge in Ireland
