= Track gauge =

Spacing of the rails on a railway track

In rail transport, track gauge is the distance between the two rails of a railway track. All vehicles on a rail network must have wheelsets that are compatible with the track gauge. Since many different track gauges exist worldwide, gauge differences often present a barrier to wider operation on railway networks.

The term derives from the metal bar, or gauge, that is used to ensure the distance between the rails is correct.

Railways also deploy two other gauges to ensure compliance with a required standard. A loading gauge is a two-dimensional profile that encompasses a cross-section of the track, a rail vehicle, and a maximum-sized load: all rail vehicles and their loads must be contained in the corresponding envelope. A structure gauge specifies the outline into which structures (bridges, platforms, lineside equipment, etc.) must not encroach.

== Uses of the term ==
The most common use of the term "track gauge" refers to the transverse distance between the inside surfaces of the two load-bearing rails of a railway track, usually measured at 12.7 millimetres (0.50 inches) to 15.9 millimetres (0.63 inches) below the top of the rail head to clear worn corners and allow for rail heads having sloping sides. The term derives from the "gauge", a metal bar with a precisely positioned lug at each end that track crews use to ensure the actual distance between the rails lies within tolerances of a prescribed standard; on curves, for example, the spacing is wider than normal. Deriving from the name of the bar, the distance between these rails is also referred to as the track gauge.

== Choice of gauge ==
=== Early track gauges ===
The earliest form of railway was a wooden wagonway, along which single wagons were manhandled, almost always in or from a mine or quarry. Initially, the wagons were guided by human muscle power; subsequently, by various mechanical methods. Timber rails wore rapidly; later, flat cast-iron plates were provided to limit the wear. In some localities, the plates were made L-shaped, with the vertical part of the L guiding the wheels; this is generally referred to as a "plateway". Flanged wheels eventually became universal, and the spacing between the rails had to be compatible with that of the wagon wheels.

As the guidance of the wagons was improved, short strings of wagons could be connected and pulled by teams of horses, and the track could be extended from the immediate vicinity of the mine or quarry, typically to a navigable waterway. The wagons were built to a consistent pattern, and the track was made to suit the needs of the horses and wagons; the gauge was the more critical factor. The Penydarren Tramroad of 1802 in South Wales, a plateway, spaced these at 4 ft 4 in (1,321 mm) over the upstands.

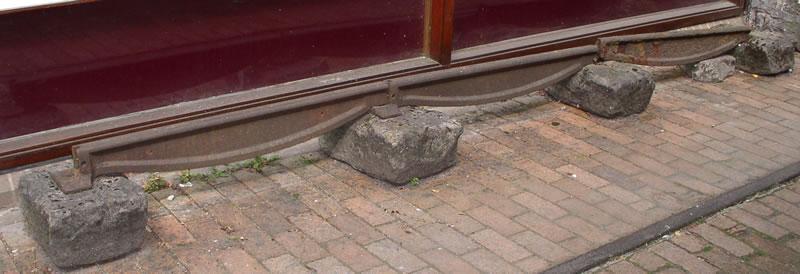
Fish-belly cast-iron rails from the Cromford and High Peak Railway

The Penydarren Tramroad probably made the first journey by locomotive in 1804, and it was successful for the locomotive but unsuccessful for the track: the plates were not strong enough to carry its weight. A considerable step forward was made when cast-iron edge rails were first employed; these had the major axis of the rail section oriented vertically, giving a much stronger section to resist bending forces, and the introduction of fish-belly rails further improved this.

Edge rails required a close match between rail spacing and wheelset configuration, reinforcing the importance of the gauge. Railways were still seen as local concerns: there was no appreciation of a future connection to other lines, and the choice of track gauge remained a pragmatic decision based on local requirements and prejudices, probably determined by existing local designs of (road) vehicles.

Thus, the Monkland and Kirkintilloch Railway (1826) in the West of Scotland used 4 ft 6 in (1,372 mm); the Dundee and Newtyle Railway (1831) in the north-east of Scotland adopted 4 ft 6 1/2 in (1,384 mm); the Redruth and Chasewater Railway (1825) in Cornwall chose 4 ft (1,219 mm).

The Arbroath and Forfar Railway opened in 1838 with a gauge of 5 ft 6 in (1,676 mm), and the Ulster Railway of 1839 used 6 ft 2 in (1,880 mm).

=== "Standard" gauge appears ===
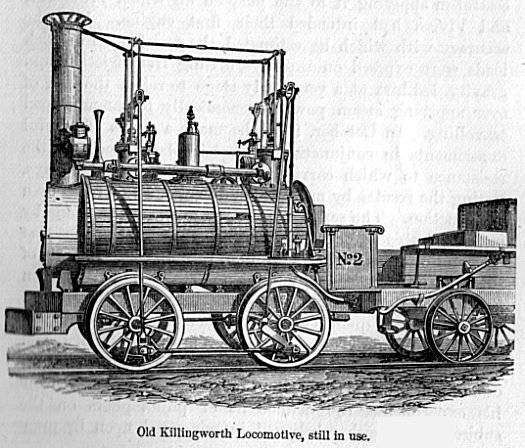
An early Stephenson locomotive

Locomotives were being developed in the first decades of the 19th century; they took various forms, but George Stephenson developed a successful locomotive on the Killingworth Wagonway, where he worked. His designs were successful, and when the Stockton and Darlington Railway was opened in 1825, it used his locomotives, with the same gauge as the Killingworth line, 4 ft 8 in (1,422 mm).

The Stockton and Darlington line was very successful, and when the Liverpool and Manchester Railway, the first intercity line, was opened in 1830, it used the same gauge. It too was very successful, and the gauge, widened to 4 ft 8 1/2 in or 1,435 mm and named "standard gauge", was well on its way to becoming the established norm.

=== Gauge differences ===
The Liverpool and Manchester was quickly followed by other trunk railways, with the Grand Junction Railway and the London and Birmingham Railway forming a huge preponderance of standard gauge. When Bristol promoters planned a line from London, they employed the innovative engineer Isambard Kingdom Brunel. He decided on a wider gauge, to give greater stability, and the Great Western Railway adopted a gauge of 7 ft (2,134 mm), later eased to 7 ft 1/4 in (2,140 mm). This became known as broad gauge. The Great Western Railway (GWR) was successful and was greatly expanded, directly and through friendly associated companies, widening the scope of broad gauge.

At the same time, other parts of Britain built railways to standard gauge, and British technology was exported to European countries and parts of North America, also using standard gauge. Britain was polarised into two areas: those that used broad gauge and those that used standard gauge. In this context, "standard gauge" was referred to as "narrow gauge" to emphasize the contrast. Some smaller concerns selected other non-standard gauges: the Eastern Counties Railway adopted 5 ft (1,524 mm). Most of them converted to standard gauge at an early date, but the GWR's broad gauge continued to grow.

The larger railway companies sought to expand geographically, and large areas were considered under their control. When a new independent line was proposed to open up an unconnected area, the gauge was crucial in determining the allegiance that the line would adopt: if it was broad gauge, it had to be friendly to the Great Western Railway; if narrow (standard) gauge, it had to favor the other companies. The battle to persuade or coerce that choice became very intense, and became referred to as the "gauge wars".

As passenger and freight transport between the two areas became increasingly important, the difficulty of moving from one gauge to the other—the break-of-gauge—became more prominent and more objectionable. In 1845, a Royal Commission on Railway Gauges was created to look into the growing problem, and this led to the Regulating the Gauge of Railways Act 1846, which forbade the construction of broad gauge lines unconnected with the broad gauge network. The broad-gauge network was eventually converted—a progressive process completed in 1892, known as gauge conversion. The same Act mandated the gauge of 5 ft 3 in (1,600 mm) for use in Ireland.

=== Gauge selection in other countries ===
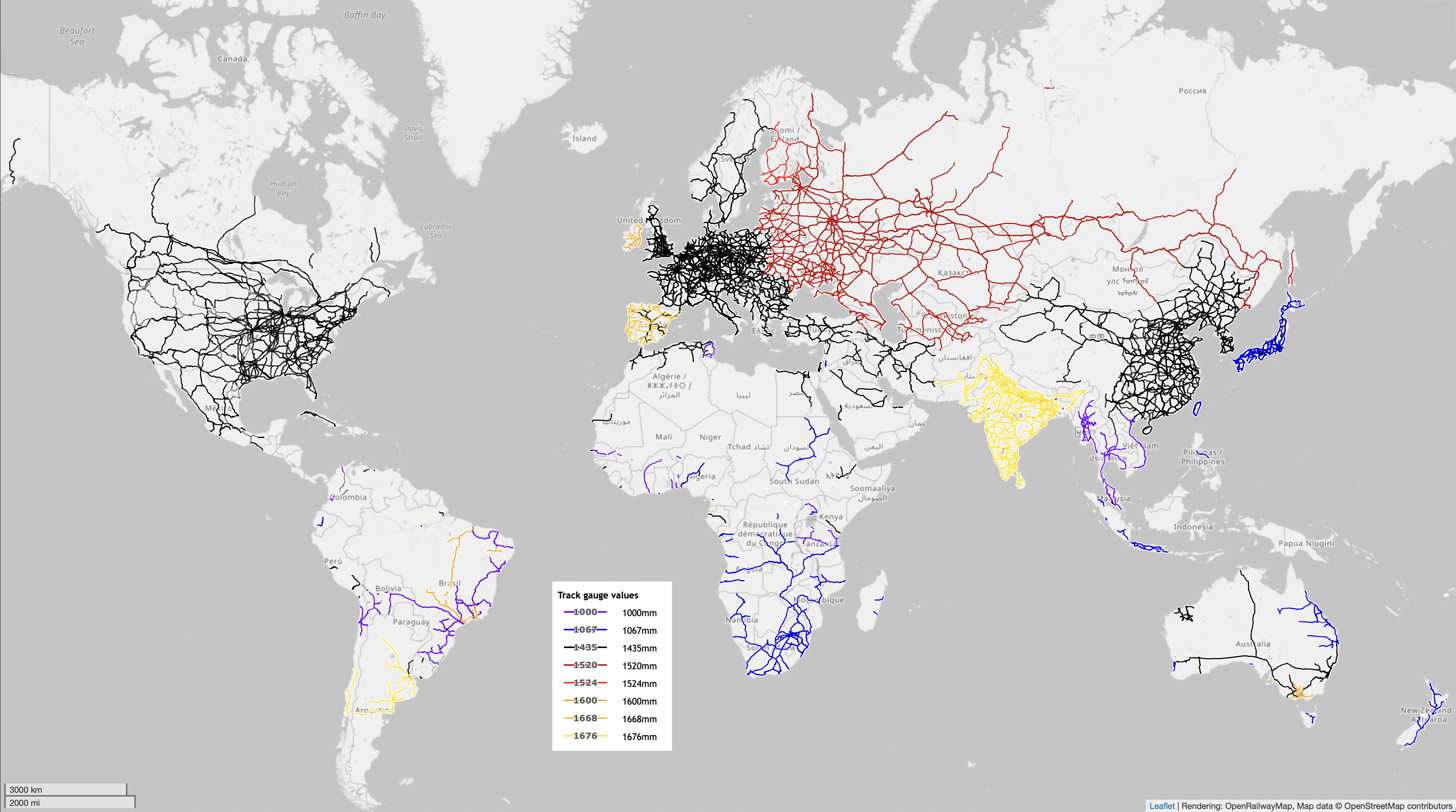
Map of the world's railways showing the different gauges in use.: 3 ft gauge (914 mm); Meter gauge (1,000 mm); Cape gauge (1,067 mm); Standard gauge (1,435 mm); Russian gauge (1,520 mm); Five foot gauge (1,524 mm); Irish gauge (1,600 mm); Iberian gauge (1,668 mm); Indian gauge (1,676 mm)

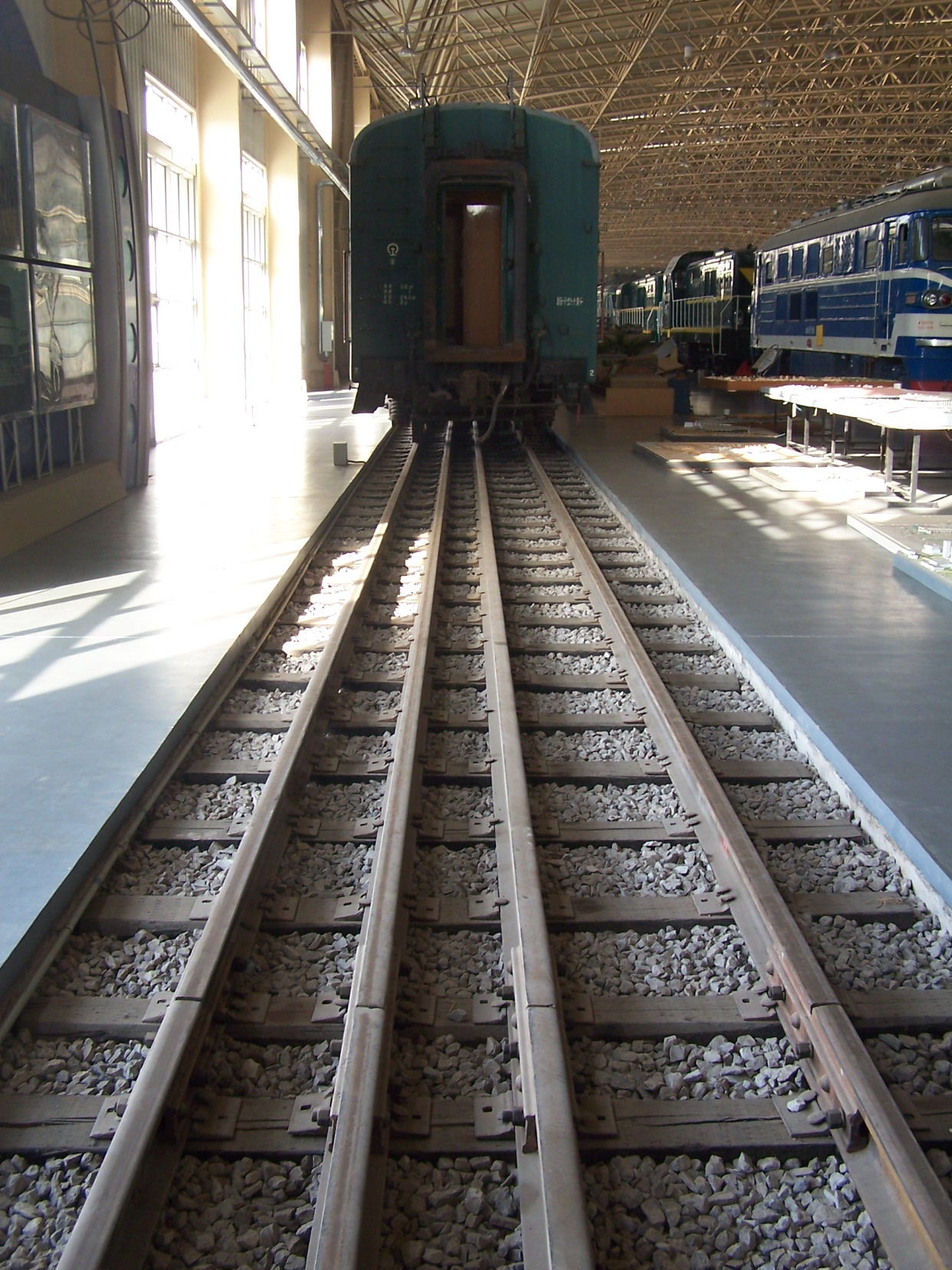
Triple gauge, from left: 1,435 mm (4 ft 8 1/2 in), 1,000 mm (3 ft 3 3/8 in), and 600 mm (1 ft 11 5/8 in), on display at the China Railway Museum in Beijing

As railways were built in other countries, the gauge selection was pragmatic: the track would have to fit the rolling stock. If locomotives were imported from elsewhere, especially in the early days, the track would be built to fit them. In some cases, standard gauge was adopted, but many countries or companies chose a different gauge as their national gauge, either by governmental policy or as a matter of individual choice.

== Terminology ==
Standard gauge is generally known world-wide as being 1,435 mm (4 ft 8 1/2 in). Terms such as broad gauge and narrow gauge do not have any fixed meaning beyond being materially wider or narrower than standard.

In British practice, the space between the rails of a track is colloquially referred to as the "four-foot", and the space between two tracks the "six-foot", descriptions relating to the respective dimensions.

=== Standard gauge ===
In modern usage, the term "standard gauge" refers to 1,435 mm (4 ft 8 1/2 in). The standard gauge is dominant in most countries, including those in North America, most of Western Europe, North Africa, the Middle East, and China.

=== Broad gauge ===
In modern usage, the term "broad gauge" generally refers to track spaced significantly wider than 1,435 mm (4 ft 8 1/2 in).

Broad gauge is the dominant gauge in countries in the Indian subcontinent, the former Soviet Union (CIS states, Baltic states, Georgia, and Ukraine), Mongolia, Finland (which still uses the original Russian imperial gauge of 1524mm), Spain, Portugal, Argentina, Chile, and Ireland. It is also used for the suburban railway systems in South Australia, and Victoria, Australia.

=== Medium gauge ===
The term "medium gauge" had different meanings throughout history, depending on the local dominant gauge in use.

In 1840s, the 1,600 mm (5 ft 3 in) Irish gauge was considered a medium gauge compared to Brunel's 7 ft 1/4 in (2,140 mm) broad gauge and the 1,435 mm (4 ft 8 1/2 in) narrow gauge, which became the modern standard gauge.

=== Narrow gauge ===
In modern usage, the term "narrow gauge" generally refers to track spaced significantly narrower than 1,435 mm (4 ft 8 1/2 in).

Narrow gauge is the dominant or second-dominant gauge in countries in Southern, Central, and East Africa; Southeast Asia; Japan; Taiwan; the Philippines; and Central and South America.

During the period known as the "battle of the gauges", Stephenson's standard gauge was commonly known as "narrow gauge", while Brunel's railways' 7 ft 1/4 in (2,140 mm) gauge was termed "broad gauge". Many narrow gauge railways were built in mountainous regions such as Wales, the Rocky Mountains of North America, Central Europe, and South America. Industrial railways and mine railways across the world are often narrow gauge. Sugar cane and banana plantations are mostly served by narrow-gauge.

=== Minimum gauge ===
Very narrow gauges of under 2 feet (610 mm) were used for some industrial railways in space-restricted environments such as mines or farms. The French company Decauville developed 500 mm (19 3/4 in) and 400 mm (15 3/4 in) tracks, mainly for mines; Heywood developed 15 in (381 mm) gauge for estate railways. The most common minimum gauges were 15 in (381 mm), 400 mm (15 3/4 in), 16 in (406 mm), 18 in (457 mm), 500 mm (19 3/4 in) or 20 in (508 mm).

=== Break of gauge ===
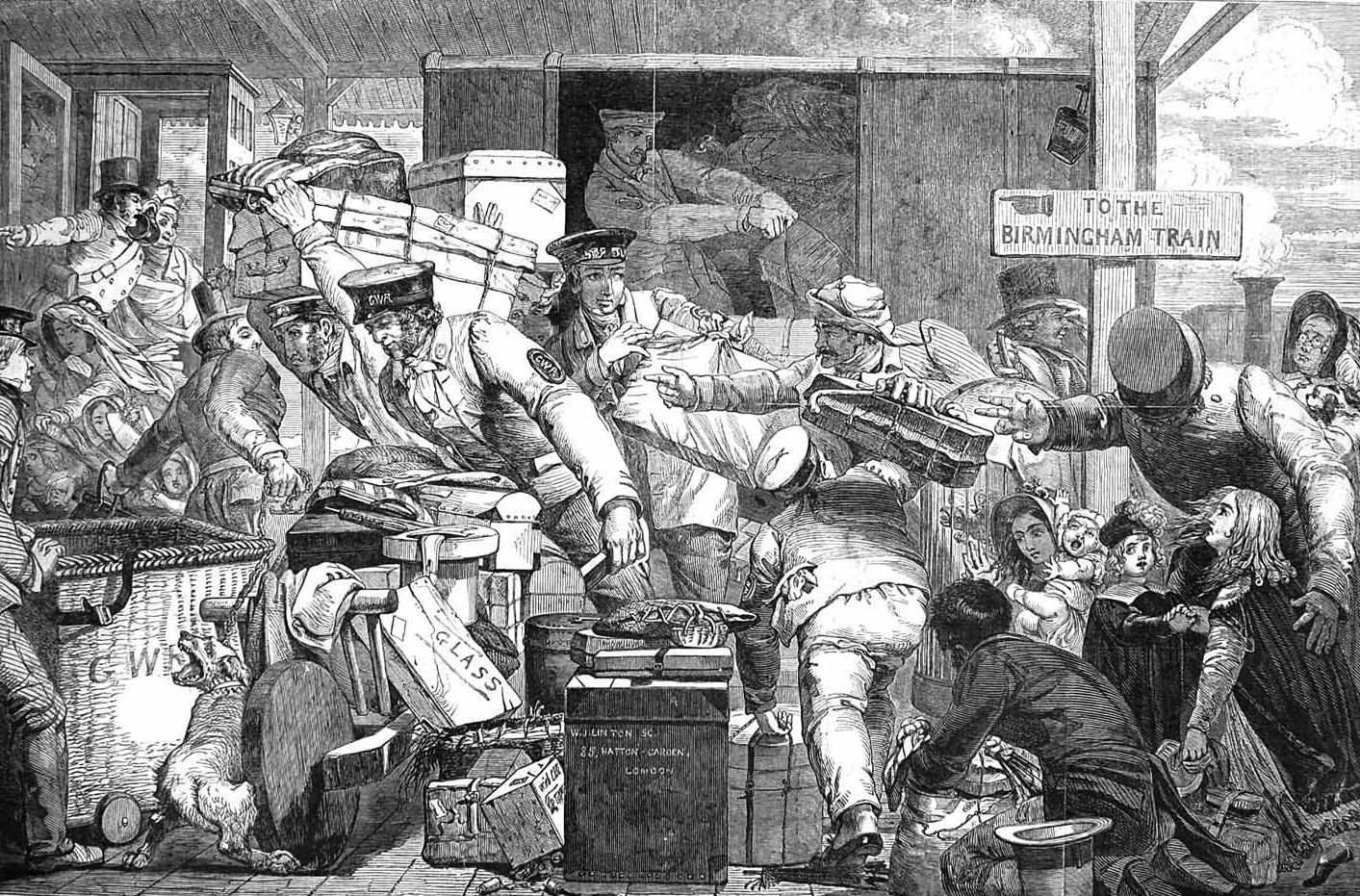
A cartoon depicting the horrors of goods transfer at the break of gauge at Gloucester in 1843

Through operation between railway networks with different gauges was originally impossible; goods had to be transshipped, and passengers had to change trains. This was obviously a major obstacle to convenient transport, and in Great Britain, it led to political intervention.

On narrow-gauge lines, rollbocks or transporter wagons are used: standard-gauge wagons are carried on these special vehicles, generally with wider-rail tracks to enable the vehicles to roll on and off at transfer points.

On the Transmongolian Railway, Russia and Mongolia use 1,520 mm (4 ft 11 27/32 in) while China uses the standard gauge of 1,435 mm. At the border, each carriage is lifted and its bogies are changed. The operation can take several hours for a whole train of many carriages.

Other examples include crossings into or out of the former Soviet Union: Ukraine/Slovakia border on the Bratislava–Lviv train, and the Romania/Moldova border on the Chișinău–Bucharest train.

A system developed by Talgo and Construcciones y Auxiliar de Ferrocarriles (CAF) of Spain uses variable gauge wheelsets; at the border between France and Spain, through passenger trains are drawn slowly through an apparatus that alters the gauge of the wheels, which slide laterally on the axles.

A similar system is used between China and Central Asia, and between Poland and Ukraine, employing the SUW 2000 and INTERGAUGE variable-axle systems. China and Poland use standard gauge, while Central Asia and Ukraine use 1,520 mm (4 ft 11 27/32 in).

== Dual gauge ==
When individual railway companies have chosen different gauges and have needed to share a route where space on the ground is limited, mixed gauge (or dual gauge) track, in which three (sometimes four) rails are supported in the same track structure, can be necessary. The most frequent need for such a track was at the approaches to city terminals or at break-of-gauge stations.

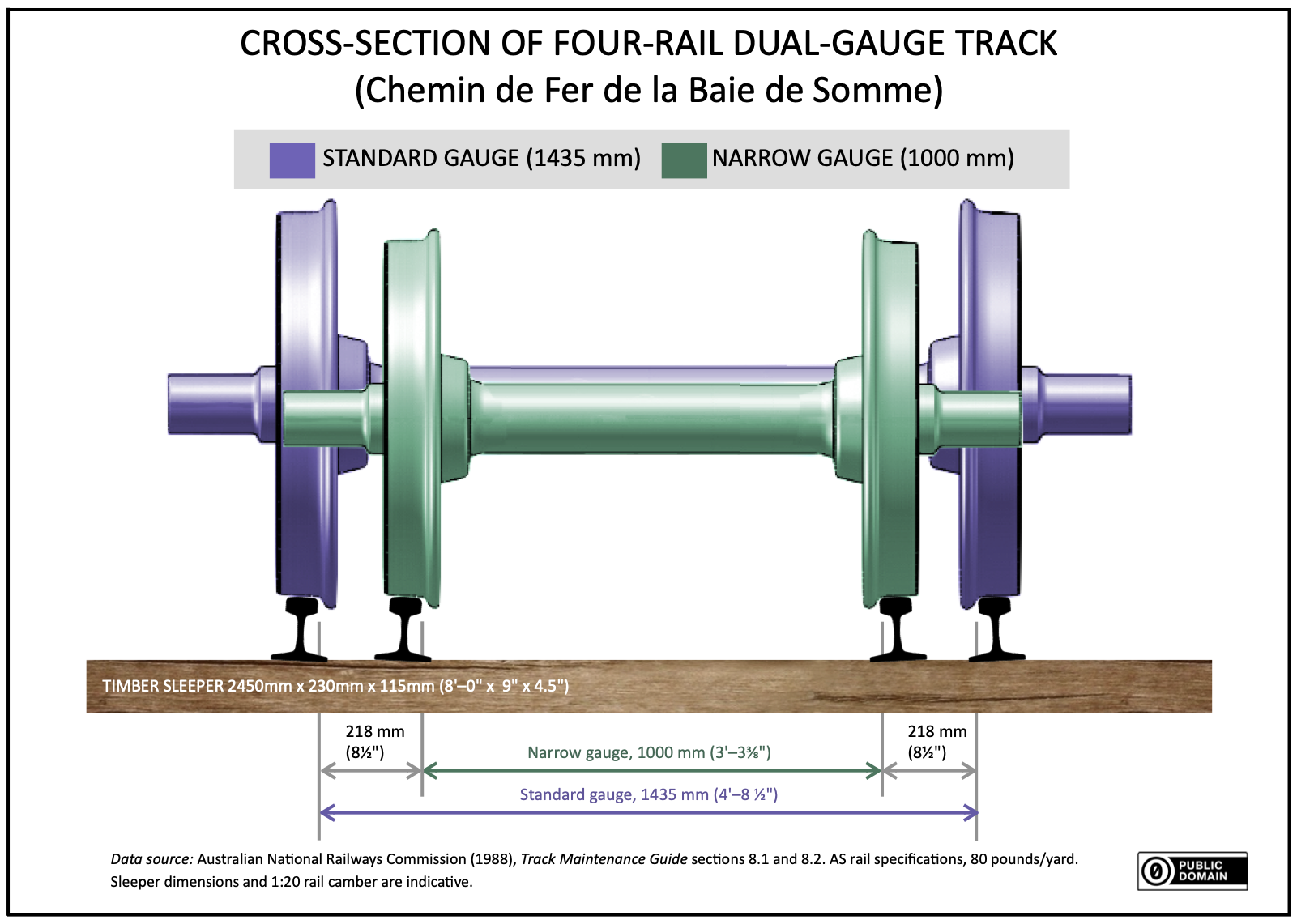
Cross-section of French 4-rail dual-gauge track (standard and metre gauges) of the Chemin de fer de la Baie de Somme

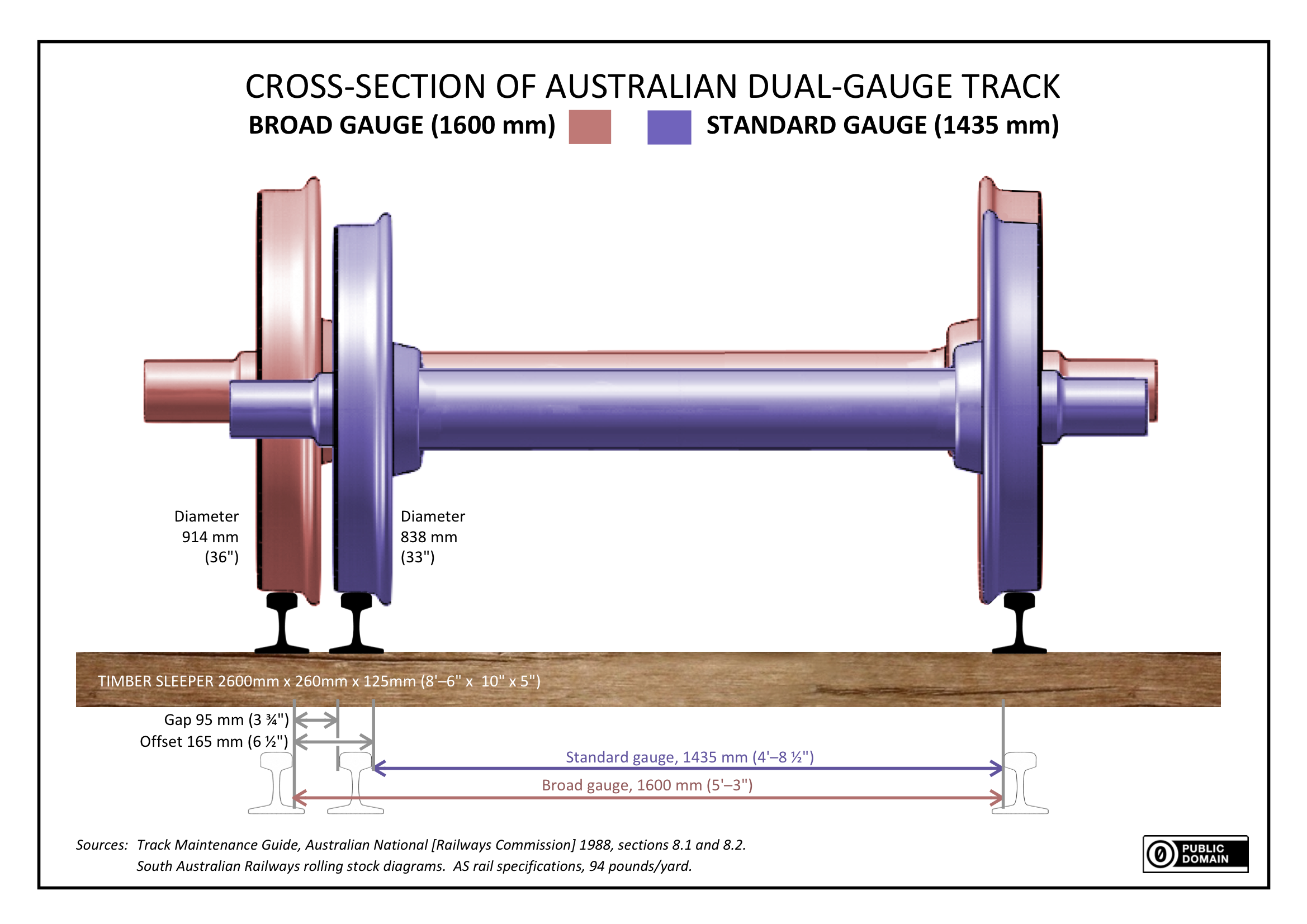
Cross-section of former Australian 3-rail dual-gauge track – 1600 mm (5 ft 3 in) and 1435 mm (4 ft 8 1/2 in) gauges

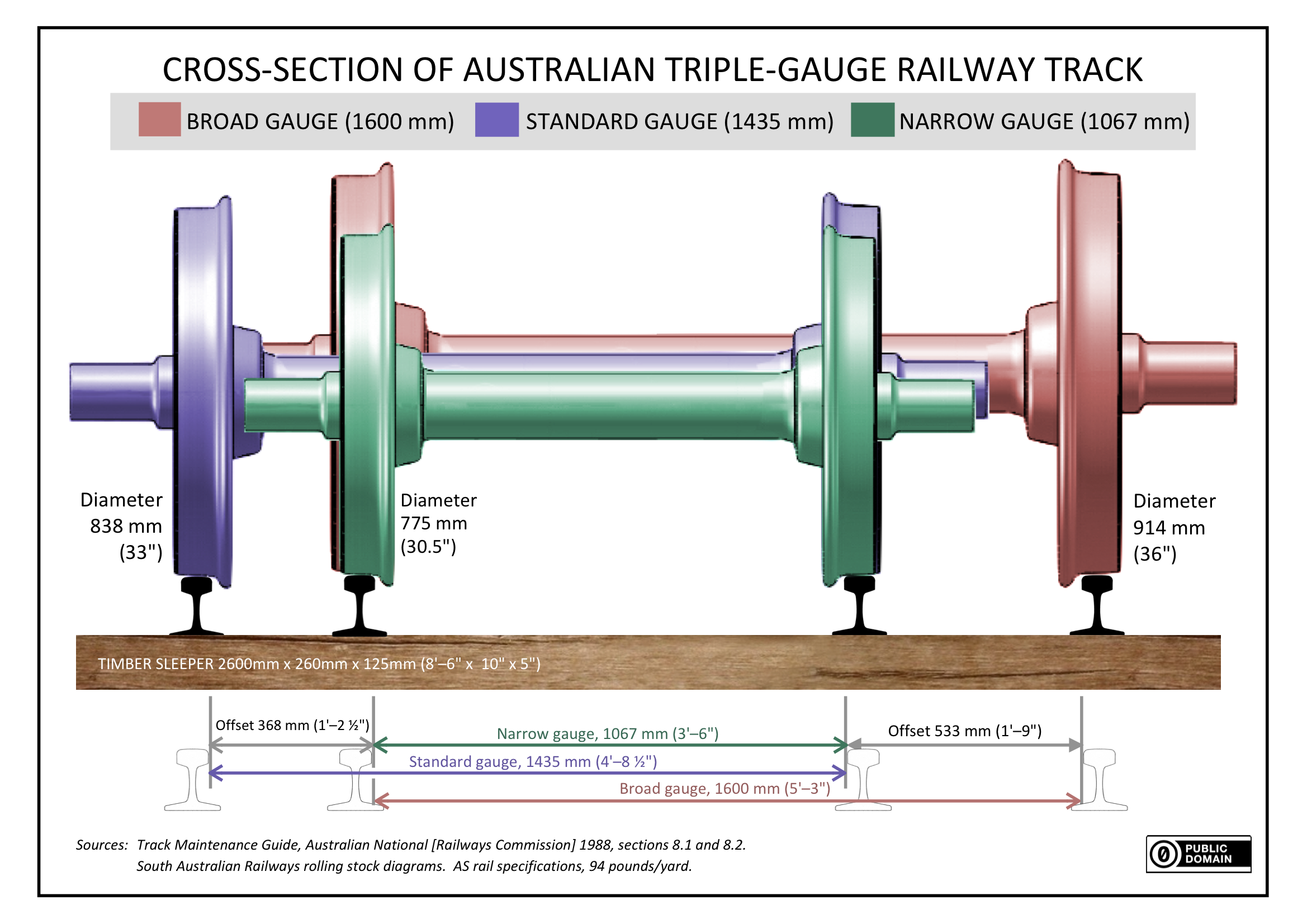
Cross-section of former Australian 4-rail triple-gauge track at Gladstone and Peterborough, South Australia, before gauge standardisation. The presence of three gauges requires different gaps between the outer and inner rails, unlike four-rail dual-gauge track, which is symmetrical.

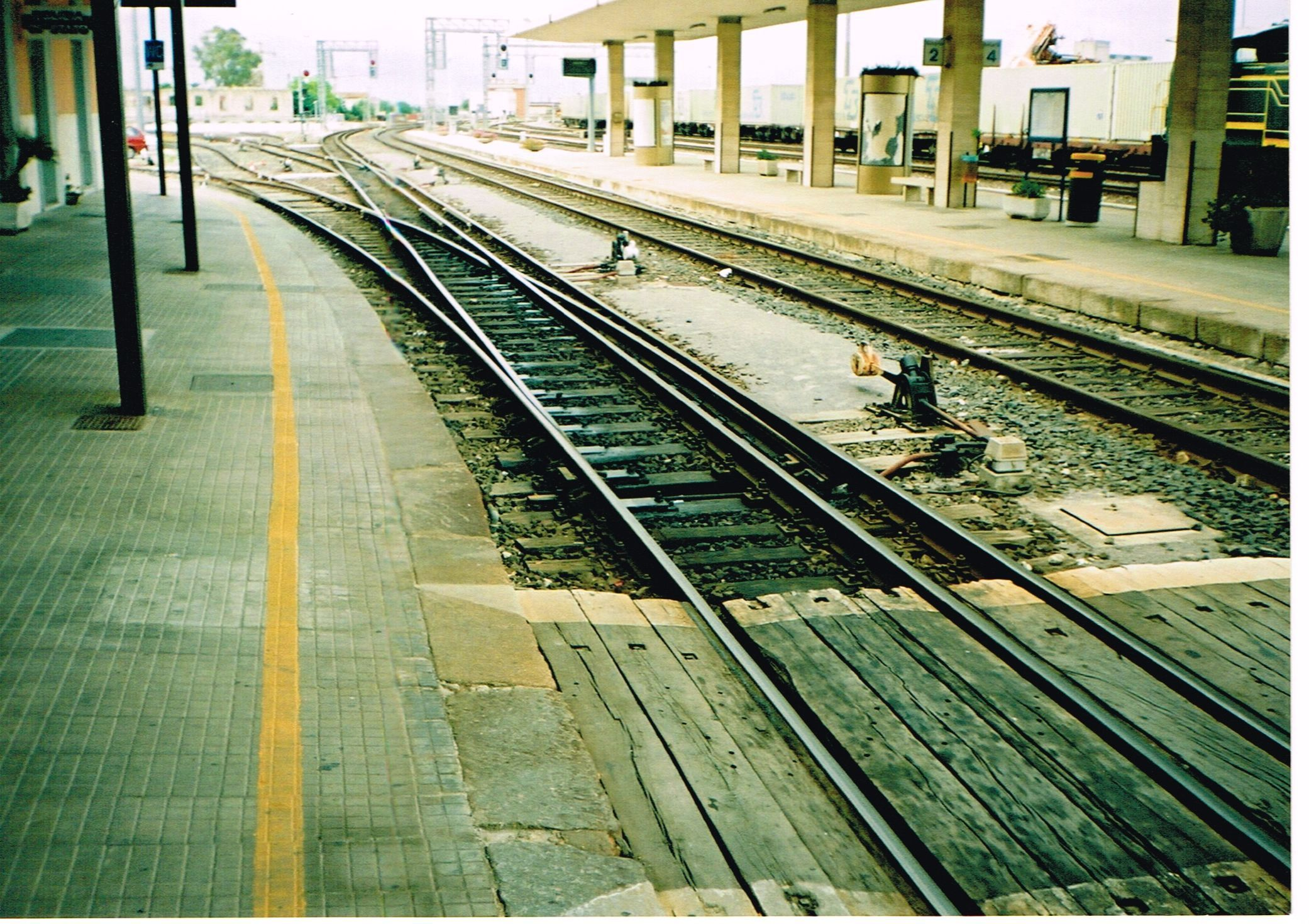
Mixed gauge track at Sassari, Sardinia: 1,435 mm (4 ft 8 1/2 in) standard gauge and 950 mm (3 ft 1 3/8 in)

Tracks with multiple gauges entail considerable construction costs (including signaling work) and complex track maintenance, and may require speed restrictions. They are therefore built only when necessary. If the difference between the two gauges is large enough – for example between 1,435 mm (4 ft 8 1/2 in) standard gauge and 3 ft 6 in (1,067 mm) – three-rail dual-gauge is possible, but if not – for example between 3 ft 6 in (1,067 mm) and 1,000 mm (3 ft 3 3/8 in) metre gauge – four rails must be used. Dual-gauge rail lines occur (or have occurred) in Argentina, Australia, Brazil, Japan, North Korea, Spain, Switzerland, Tunisia, and Vietnam.

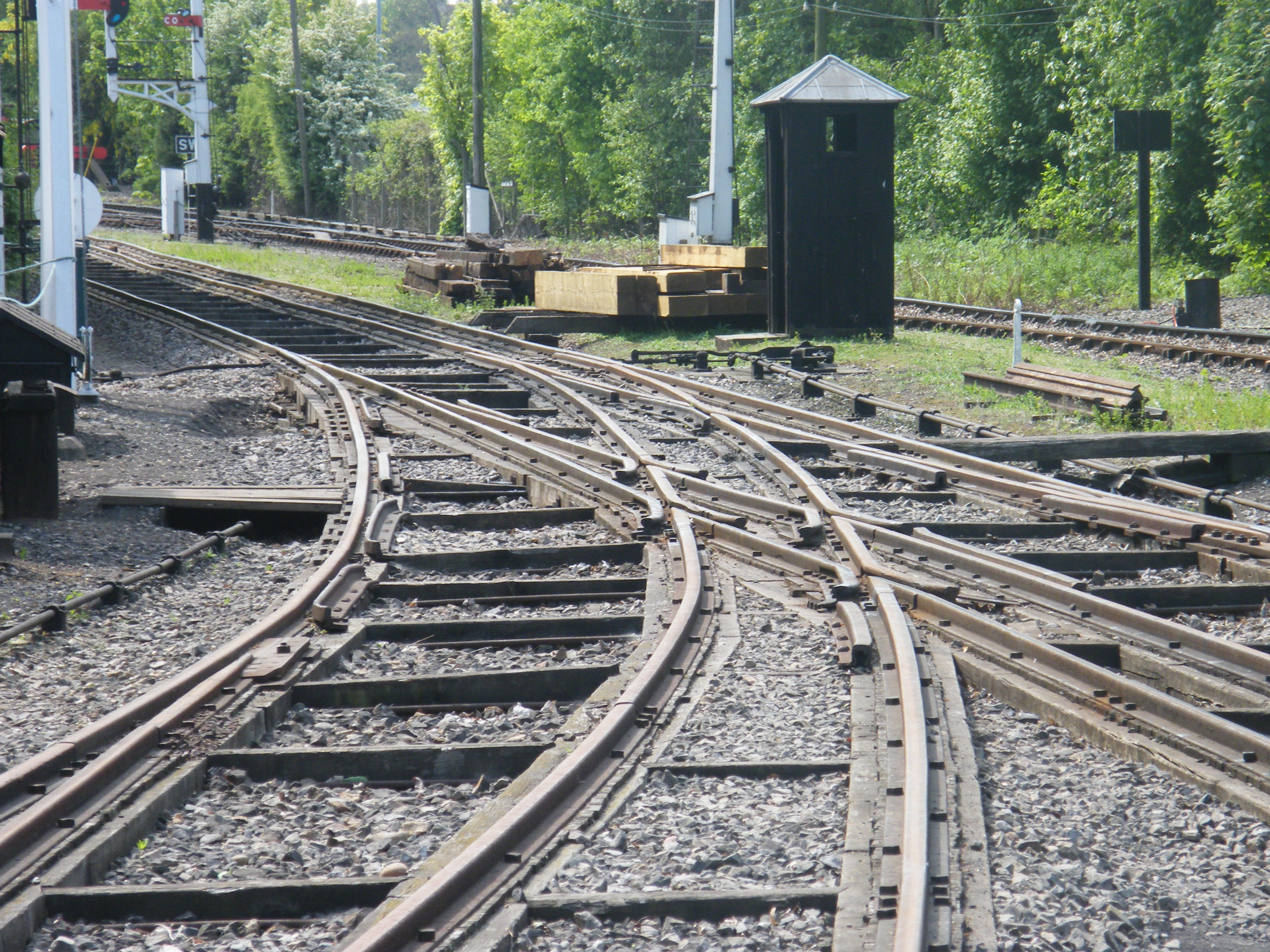
Reconstructed mixed-gauge, 1,435 mm (4 ft 8 1/2 in) standard gauge and 7 ft 1/4 in (2,140 mm) track at Didcot Railway Museum, England

On the GWR, there was an extended period between political intervention in 1846 that prevented major expansion of its 7 ft 1/4 in (2,140 mm) broad gauge (Note: The Act of Parliament did not prohibit expansion of the existing broad gauge system, but it had the indirect and delayed effect of forcing conformity with the "standard" gauge eventually.) and the final gauge conversion to standard gauge in 1892. During this period, many locations' practical requirements necessitated mixed-gauge operation, and in station areas, the track configuration was extremely complex. This was compounded by the common rail being on the platform side at stations; therefore, in many cases, standard-gauge trains needed to be switched from one side of the track to the other at the approach. A special fixed-point arrangement was devised for the purpose, with a simple enough track layout. (Note: Jenkins, S. C. and Langley, R. C. (2002), The West Cornwall Railway, Usk: The Oakwood Press, ISBN 0853615896, gives an illustration and description on page 66.)

In some cases, mixed-gauge trains were operated with wagons of both gauges. For example, MacDermot wrote:

In November 1871 a novelty in the shape of a mixed-gauge goods train was introduced between Truro and Penzance. It was worked by a narrow-gauge engine, and behind the narrow-gauge trucks came a broad-gauge match-truck with wide buffers and sliding shackles, followed by the broad-gauge trucks. Such trains continued to run in West Cornwall until the abolition of the Broad Gauge; they had to stop or come down to walking pace at all stations where fixed points existed and the narrow portion side-stepped to right or left.

=== Triple gauge ===
In rare situations, three different gauges may converge onto a rail yard, and triple-gauge track is needed to meet the operational needs of the break-of-gauge station – most commonly where there is insufficient space to do otherwise. Construction and operation of triple-gauge track and its signaling, however, involves immense cost and disruption, and is undertaken when no other alternative is available.

== Nominal track gauge ==
The nominal track gauge is the distance between the inner faces of the rails. In current practice, it is specified at a certain distance below the rail head, as the inner faces of the rail head (the gauge faces) are not necessarily vertical. Some amount of tolerance is necessarily allowed from the nominal gauge to allow for wear, etc.; this tolerance is typically greater for track limited to slower speeds, and tighter for track where higher speeds are expected (as an example, in the US the gauge is allowed to vary between 4 ft 8 in (1,420 mm) to 4 ft 10 in (1,470 mm) for track limited to 10 mph (16 km/h), while 70 mph (110 km/h) track is allowed only 4 ft 8 in (1,420 mm) to 4 ft 9 1/2 in (1,460 mm). Given the allowed tolerance, it is common practice to widen the gauge slightly in curves, particularly those of shorter radius (which are inherently slower-speed curves).

Rolling stock on the network must have running gear (wheelsets) compatible with the gauge; therefore, the gauge is a key parameter in determining interoperability, but there are many others – see below. In some cases, in the earliest days of railways, the railway company saw itself as an infrastructure provider only, and independent haulers provided wagons suited to the gauge. Colloquially, the wagons might be referred to as "four-foot gauge wagons", say, if the track had a gauge of four feet. This nominal value does not equate to the flange spacing, as some freedom is allowed for.

An infrastructure manager might specify new or replacement track components at a slight variation from the nominal gauge for pragmatic reasons.

== Units ==
The gauge is defined in imperial units, metric units or SI units.

Imperial units were established in the United Kingdom by the Weights and Measures Act 1824. The United States customary units for length did not agree with the imperial system until 1959, when one international yard was defined as 0.9144 meters and, as derived units, 1 foot (=1/3 yd) as 0.3048 meter and 1 inch (=1/36 yd) as 25.4 mm.

The list shows the imperial and other units that have been used for track gauge definitions:

Unit	SI equivalent	Track gauge example
Imperial foot	304.8 mm	
Castilian foot	278.6 mm	6 Castilian feet = 1,672 mm (5 ft 5 13/16 in); 2 Castilian feet 558 mm (1 ft 9 31/32 in)
Portuguese foot	332.8 mm	5 Portuguese feet = 1,664 mm (5 ft 5 1/2 in)
Swedish foot	296.904 mm	3 Swedish feet = 891 mm (2 ft 11 3/32 in); 2.7 Swedish feet = 802 mm (2 ft 7 9/16 in)
Prussian foot (Rheinfuß)	313.85 mm	2 1/2 Prussian feet = 785 mm (2 ft 6 29/32 in)
Austrian fathom	1520 mm	1/2 Austrian fathom = 760 mm (2 ft 5 15/16 in)

== Temporary way – permanent way ==
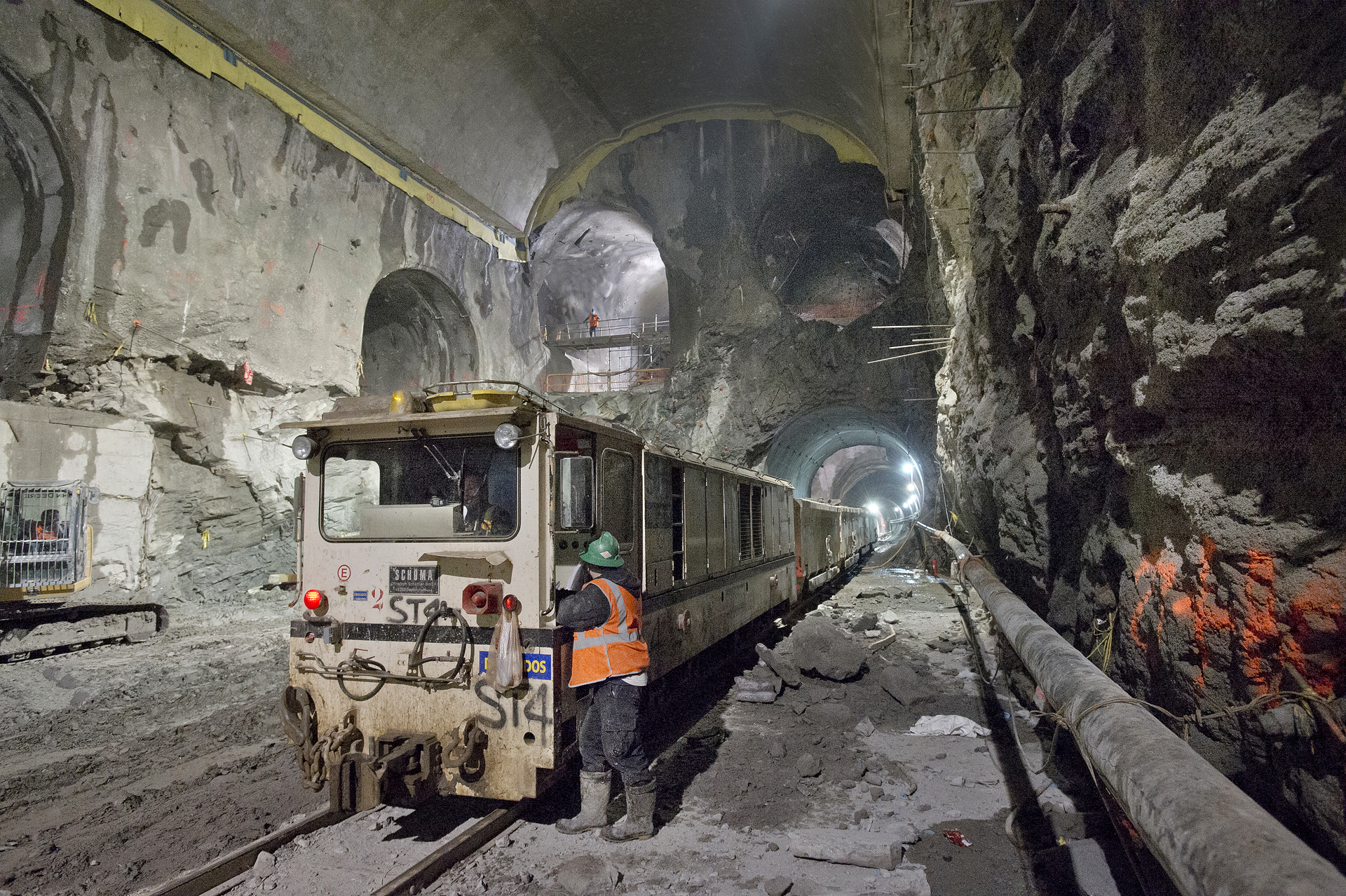
Narrow gauge work train in the East Side Access cavern where the Manhattan terminus of the standard gauge Long Island Rail Road was built.

A temporary way is the temporary track often used for construction, to be replaced by the permanent way (the structure consisting of the rails, fasteners, sleepers/ties and ballast (or slab track), plus the underlying subgrade) when construction nears completion. In many cases, narrow-gauge track is used temporarily because of the convenience of laying it and relocating it over unimproved ground.

In restricted spaces such as tunnels, the temporary arrangement might be double-track, even though the tunnel will ultimately be single-track. The Airport Rail Link in Sydney had construction trains of 900 mm (2 ft 11 7/16 in) gauge, which were replaced by permanent tracks of 1,435 mm (4 ft 8 1/2 in) gauge.

During World War I, trench warfare led to a relatively static disposition of infantry, requiring considerable logistics to bring them support staff and supplies (food, ammunition, earthworks materials, etc.). Both sides established dense light railway networks using temporary narrow-gauge track sections for this purpose.

In 1939, it was proposed to construct the western section of the Yunnan–Burma Railway using a gauge of 15 1/4 in (387 mm), since such a tiny or "toy" gauge facilitates the tightest of curves in difficult terrain.

== Maintenance standards ==
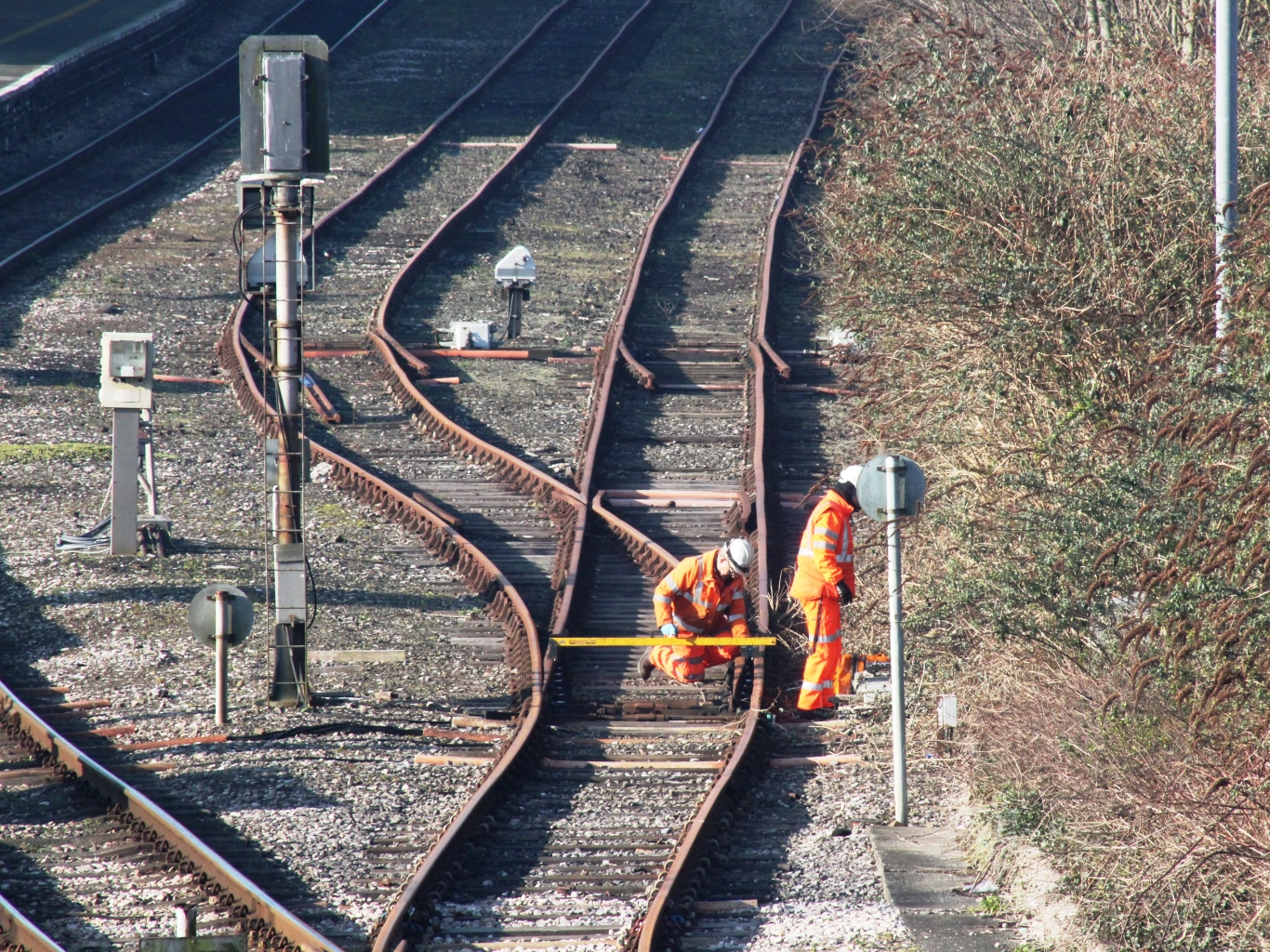
Track maintenance workers checking the gauge at Plymouth, England

Infrastructure owners specify permitted variances from the nominal gauge and the required interventions to be taken when a non-compliant gauge is detected. For example, the Federal Railroad Administration in the US specifies that the actual gauge of a 1,435 mm track that is rated for a maximum of 60 mph (96.6 km/h) must be between 4 ft 8 in (1,422 mm) and 4 ft 9.5 in (1,460 mm).

== Advantages and disadvantages of different track gauges ==
Speed, capacity, and economy are generally objectives of rail transport, but there is often an inverse relationship between these priorities. There is a common misconception that a narrower gauge permits a tighter turning radius, but for practical purposes, there is no meaningful relationship between gauge and curvature.

=== Construction cost ===
Narrower gauge railways usually cost less to build because they are usually lighter in construction, using smaller cars and locomotives (smaller loading gauge), as well as smaller bridges, smaller tunnels (smaller structure gauge). Narrow gauge is thus often used in mountainous terrain, where the savings in civil engineering work can be substantial. It is also used in sparsely populated areas, with low potential demand, and for temporary railways that will be removed after short-term use, such as for construction, the logging industry, the mining industry, or large-scale construction projects, especially in confined spaces (see Temporary way – permanent way).

For temporary railways which will be removed after short-term use, such as those used in logging, mining, or large-scale construction projects, especially in confined spaces, such as when constructing the Channel Tunnel, a narrow-gauge railway is substantially cheaper and easier to install and remove. Such railways have almost vanished due to the capabilities of modern trucks. In many countries, narrow-gauge railways were built as branch lines to feed traffic into standard-gauge lines because of lower construction costs. The choice was often not between a narrow-gauge railway and a standard-gauge railway, but between a narrow-gauge railway and none at all.

Broader gauge railways are generally more expensive to build, because they are usually heavier in construction, use larger cars and locomotives (larger loading gauge), as well as larger bridges, larger tunnels (larger structure gauge). But broader gauges offer higher speed and capacity. For high-traffic routes, greater capacity may more than offset the higher initial construction cost.

=== Interchangeability ===
The value or utility a user derives from a good or service depends on the number of users of compatible products – the "network effect" in economics. Network effects are typically positive, resulting in a given user deriving more value from a product as other users join the same network. At national levels, the network effect has resulted in commerce extending beyond regional and national boundaries. Increasingly, many governments and companies have made their railway engineering and operational standards compatible to achieve interchangeability – hence faster, longer-distance train operation. A major barrier to achieving interchangeability, however, is path dependence – in this context the persistence of an already adopted standard to which equipment, infrastructure and training has become aligned.

Since adopting a new standard is difficult and expensive, continuing with an existing standard can remain attractive, unless longer-term benefits are given appropriate weight. An example of the consequences of path dependence is the persistence in the United Kingdom – the earliest nation to develop and adopt railway technologies – of structure gauges that are too small to allow the larger rolling stock of continental Europe to operate in the UK. The reduced cost, greater efficiency, and greater economic opportunity offered by the use of a common standard have resulted in the historical multitude of track gauges dwindling to a small number that predominate worldwide.

When interchangeability has not been achieved, freight and passengers must be transferred through time-consuming procedures requiring manual labor and substantial capital expenditure. Some bulk commodities, such as coal, ore, and gravel, can be mechanically transshipped. Still, even this is time-consuming, and the equipment required for the transfer is often complex to maintain. If rail lines of different gauges coexist in a network and a break of gauge exists, it is difficult in times of peak demand to move rolling stock to where it is needed.

Sufficient rolling stock must be available to meet a narrow-gauge railway's peak demand, which might be greater in comparison to a broader-gauge network, and the surplus equipment generates no cash flow during periods of low demand. In regions where narrow-gauge lines form a small part of the rail network (as was the case on Russia's Sakhalin Railway), there is an extra cost associated with designing, manufacturing, or importing narrow-gauge equipment.

Solutions to interchangeability problems include bogie exchanges, a rollbock system, dual gauge, variable gauge, or gauge conversion.

== Dominant railway gauges ==
More than half of the world's railways are built to 1,435 mm (4 ft 8 1/2 in) standard gauge. New railways have been built in Africa to standard gauge. Most of the narrow-gauge railways in India are being converted to the dominant, broad-gauge.

System		Installation			
Gauge	Name	in km	in miles	% world	by location
1,000 mm (3 ft 3 3/8 in)	Metre-gauge railway	71,000	44,000	6.4%	Argentina (11,000 km or 6,800 mi), Brazil (23,489 km or 14,595 mi), Bolivia, northern Chile, Greece (in the disused Peloponnese network), Spain (Renfe, FGC, Euskotren, FGV, SFM), Switzerland (RhB, MOB, BOB, MGB), Malaysia, Thailand, Cambodia, Bangladesh, East Africa, Vietnam and Denmark
1,067 mm (3 ft 6 in)	3 ft 6 in gauge railways	96,000	60,000	8.6%	Southern and Central Africa; Nigeria (most); Indonesia (Java and Sumatera); Japan; Taiwan; Philippines; New Zealand; and the Australian states of Queensland, Western Australia, Tasmania and South Australia.
1,435 mm (4 ft 8 1/2 in)	Standard-gauge railway	678,000	421,000	60.6%	Albania, Argentina, Australia, Austria, Belgium, Bosnia and Herzegovina, Brazil (194 km or 121 mi), Bulgaria, Canada, China, Croatia, Cuba, Czech Republic, Denmark, Djibouti, DR Congo (Kamina-Lubumbashi section, planned), Ethiopia, France, Germany, Great Britain (United Kingdom), Greece, Hong Kong, Hungary, India (only used in rapid transit and High-speed rail), Indonesia (Aceh rail, Bali MRT (under construction), LRT Jabodetabek, LRT Jakarta, MRT Jakarta East - West Line Corridor, High-speed rail in Indonesia, and Sulawesi), Italy, Israel, Kenya (Mombasa–Nairobi Standard Gauge Railway), Laos, Liechtenstein, Lithuania (Rail Baltica), Luxembourg, Macedonia, Mauritius (Metro Express), Mexico, Montenegro, Netherlands, North Korea, Norway, Panama, Peru, Philippines, Poland, Romania, Serbia, Singapore MRT, Slovakia, Slovenia, South Korea, Spain (AVE, Alvia and FGC), Sweden, Switzerland, Turkey, United States, Uruguay, Venezuela, north Vietnam. Also, private companies' lines and JR high-speed lines in Japan. High-speed lines in Taiwan. Gautrain commuter system in South Africa. New lines in Tanzania and Nigeria.
1,520 mm (4 ft 11 27/32 in)	5 ft and 1520 mm gauge railways	155,000	96,000	13.8%	Armenia, Azerbaijan, Belarus, Georgia, Kazakhstan, Kyrgyzstan, Latvia, Lithuania, Moldova, Mongolia, Russia, Tajikistan, Turkmenistan, Ukraine, Uzbekistan. (all contiguous – redefined from 1,524 mm (5 ft))
1,524 mm (5 ft)	5 ft and 1520 mm gauge railways	7,065	4,390	0.6%	Estonia, Finland (contiguous, and generally compatible, except high speed trains, with 1,520 mm (4 ft 11 27/32 in)
1,600 mm (5 ft 3 in)	5 ft 3 in gauge railways	9,800	6,100	0.9%	Ireland, Northern Ireland (United Kingdom) (1,800 km or 1,100 mi), and in the Australian states of Victoria and South Australia (4,017 km or 2,496 mi), Brazil (4,057 km or 2,521 mi)
1,668 mm (5 ft 5 21/32 in)	Iberian-gauge railways	16,700	10,400	1.5%	Portugal, Spain. Sometimes referred to as Iberian gauge. In Spain, the Administrador de Infraestructuras Ferroviarias (ADIF) managed 11,683 km (7,259 mi) of this gauge and 22 km (14 mi) of mixed gauge at the end of 2010. The Portuguese Rede Ferroviária Nacional (REFER) managed 2,650 km (1,650 mi) of this gauge of this track at the same date.
1,676 mm (5 ft 6 in)	5 ft 6 in gauge railways	100,000	62,000	9.0%	India, Pakistan, Bangladesh, Sri Lanka, Argentina, Chile, BART in the United States San Francisco Bay Area

=== Prevalence ===
Total for each group of gauges in 2020:

Gauge	Installation (km)	Installation (mi)	Percentage (2020)	Percentage (2014)
Narrow gauge(s)	233,391	145,022	17.5%	15.8%
Standard gauge	807,616	501,829	60.6%	54.9%
Broad gauge(s)	290,705	180,636	21.8%	29.3%
Totals	1,331,712	827,487	100%	100%

== Future ==
Further convergence of rail gauge use seems likely, as countries seek to build interoperable networks and international organizations seek to build macro-regional and continental networks. Almost all new high-speed rail lines are built to standard gauge, except in Uzbekistan and Russia.

=== Europe ===
The European Union has set out to develop interoperable freight and passenger rail networks across its area, and is seeking to standardize gauge, signaling, and electrical power systems. EU funds have been dedicated to assist Lithuania, Latvia, and Estonia in the building of some key railway lines (Rail Baltica) of standard gauge, and to assist Spain and Portugal in the construction of high-speed lines to connect Iberian cities and to the French high-speed lines. The EU has developed plans for improved freight rail links between Spain, Portugal, and the rest of Europe.

=== Trans-Asian Railway ===
The United Nations Economic and Social Commission for Asia and the Pacific (UNESCAP) is planning a Trans-Asian Railway that will link Europe and the Pacific, with a Northern Corridor from Europe to the Korean Peninsula, a Southern Corridor from Europe to Southeast Asia, and a North–South corridor from Northern Europe to the Persian Gulf. All of these would encounter changes in gauge as they cross Asia. Current plans call for mechanized facilities at the breaks of gauge to move containers from train to train, rather than for widespread gauge conversion. The Northern Corridor through Russia has been operating since before the year 2000, with increasing volumes to China–Europe.

=== The Americas ===
- 2008: Proposed link between Venezuela and Colombia
- 2008: Venezuela via Brazil to Argentina – standard gauge
- 2008: A proposed metre gauge line across Southern Paraguay to link Argentina at Resistencia to Brazil at Cascavel; both those lines are 1,000 mm (3 ft 3 3/8 in) metre gauge, and the new line would allow "bioceanic" running from the Atlantic port of Paranaguá in Brazil to that of Antofagasta in Chile on the Pacific.
- 2013: The proposed link between Venezuela to Argentina was suspended and stalled due to financial problems.
- 2021: The proposed link between Venezuela and Colombia was abandoned after flaws caused by infrastructure of both the trains and the terrain were brought up.
- 2026: These projects were evolved to become the Capricorn Bioceanic Corridor.
- 2026: The government of Chile discontinued the Bioceanic Corridor project due to insufficient cargo demand projections to justify the multibillion-dollar rail costs.

=== Africa ===
The East African Railway Master Plan is a proposal for rebuilding and expanding railway lines connecting Ethiopia, Djibouti, Kenya, Uganda, Rwanda, Burundi, Tanzania, South Sudan and beyond. The plan is managed by infrastructure ministers from participating East African Community countries in association with transport consultation firm CPCS Transcom. Older railways are of 1,000 mm (3 ft 3 3/8 in) metre gauge or 3 ft 6 in (1,067 mm) gauge. Newly rebuilt lines will use standard gauge. Regular freight and passenger services began on the standard gauge Mombasa–Nairobi railway in 2017 and on the standard gauge Addis Ababa–Djibouti railway in 2018.

Lines for iron ore to Kribi in Cameroon are likely to be 1,435 mm (4 ft 8 1/2 in) standard gauge with a likely connection to the same port from the 1,000 mm (3 ft 3 3/8 in) metre gauge Cameroon system.

Nigeria's railways are mostly 3 ft 6 in (1,067 mm) Cape gauge. The Lagos–Kano Standard Gauge Railway is a gauge conversion project by the Nigerian Government to create a north–south standard gauge rail link. The first converted segment, between Abuja and Kaduna, was completed in July 2016.

The African Union has a 50-year plan to connect the capital cities and major centers by high-speed railways.

== Timeline ==
Gauge	Date	Chosen by
4 ft 8 1/2 in (1,435 mm)	1825	George Stephenson
5 ft (1,524 mm)	1827	Horatio Allen for the South Carolina Canal and Rail Road Company
1 ft 11 1/2 in (597 mm)	1836	Henry Archer for the Festiniog Railway to easily navigate mountainous terrain (Britain's first steam-hauled narrow gauge passenger service in 1865) (originally horse-drawn)
7 ft 1/4 in (2,140 mm)	1838	I. K. Brunel
5 ft (1,524 mm)	1842	George Washington Whistler for the Moscow – Saint Petersburg Railway based on Southern US practice
5 ft 3 in (1,600 mm)	1846	Chosen in Ireland as a compromise
5 ft 6 in (1,676 mm)	1853	Lord Dalhousie for British India, following recommendations of Mr. W. Simms, a consulting engineer
3 ft 6 in (1,067 mm)	1862	Carl Pihl for the Røros Line in Norway to reduce costs
3 ft (914 mm)	1870	William Jackson Palmer for the Denver & Rio Grande Railway to reduce costs (inspired by the Festiniog Railway)
2 ft (610 mm)	1877	George E. Mansfield for the Billerica and Bedford Railroad to reduce costs (inspired by the Festiniog Railway)
2 ft 6 in (762 mm)	1887	Everard Calthrop to reduce costs; had designs for a matching fleet of rolling stock

== See also ==
- History of rail transport
- List of track gauges
- List of tram systems by gauge and electrification
- Rail profile
- Rail terminology
- Rail transport modelling scales
- Rapid transit track gauge
