= Railway costing =

Railway costing is the calculation of the variable and fixed costs of rail movements. Variable costs are those that increase or decrease with changes in the traffic volumes or service levels and include fuel, maintenance and train crew costs, for example. Fixed costs are normally associated with items such as head office, interest charges and other overhead. Unit costs can then be calculated based on the expenses of the railway divided into standard categories.

== Types of cost ==
In order to assist in its deliberations regarding rate and service complaints, the Canadian Transportation Agency has identified various types of costs. These costs include:

- the maintenance and operation of way and structures, such as track and roadway, signals, communication, and fuel stations
- the maintenance and operation of equipment, such as locomotives, freight cars, intermodal equipment, and work equipment
- railway operations, such as train and yard operations, train control, and intermodal
- general costs, such as general administration, employee benefits, taxes, insurance, purchasing and material stores
- cost of capital
- depreciation

== Methodology ==
The methodology used in railway costing breaks down the costs of rail traffic to their unit value and from there determines their relationship to traffic handled and service provided. Therefore, as traffic and services change, the effect of these changes can be estimated from the unit values previously determined. The costing model methodology allows for variable costs to increase as traffic increases, whereas the fixed costs will remain constant, regardless of the overall level of traffic.

== Mathematical models ==
Railway costing is typically performed using mathematical models. Using unit costs from current operating data and current accounting and operating information, it is possible to develop costing information for the railway. This costing information may be used to estimate the operating cost of a new line and to determine whether it is economically viable. Alternatively, the model could be used to estimate the cost effects of changing speed limits along a route. The savings that can be achieved with a railway costing model are endless. For example, by knowing the costs of doing business, a railway can appropriately determine the tariffs to be charged.

In addition, railway costing models typically handle passenger and freight traffic, making them applicable in more situations, including mixed traffic situations.

some commercial variations of railway costing models have been implemented, including the OSCAR railway costing model developed by CPCS Transcom. CPCS is an international infrastructure development firm and has successfully used this model in dozens of its projects worldwide.

The Cartage railway costing model was developed by Vectorail, a global supplier of railway costing solutions with more than forty years of experience in the field.
