= Track gauge in Ireland =

Irish railway standard

The track gauge adopted by the mainline railways in Ireland is 1,600 mm (5 ft 3 in). This unusually broad track gauge is otherwise found only in Australia (where it was introduced by the Irish railway engineer F. W. Sheilds), in the states of Victoria, southern New South Wales (via some extensions of the Victorian rail network) and South Australia, as well as in Brazil.

The Grand Duchy of Baden State Railway used this gauge between 1840 and 1855, as did the Canterbury Provincial Railways in New Zealand, until conversion to the 1,067 mm (3 ft 6 in) gauge in the 1860s. The Launceston and Western Railway in Tasmania also used this gauge from 1871, until conversion to 1,067 mm (3 ft 6 in) gauge in 1888.

== Different gauges ==
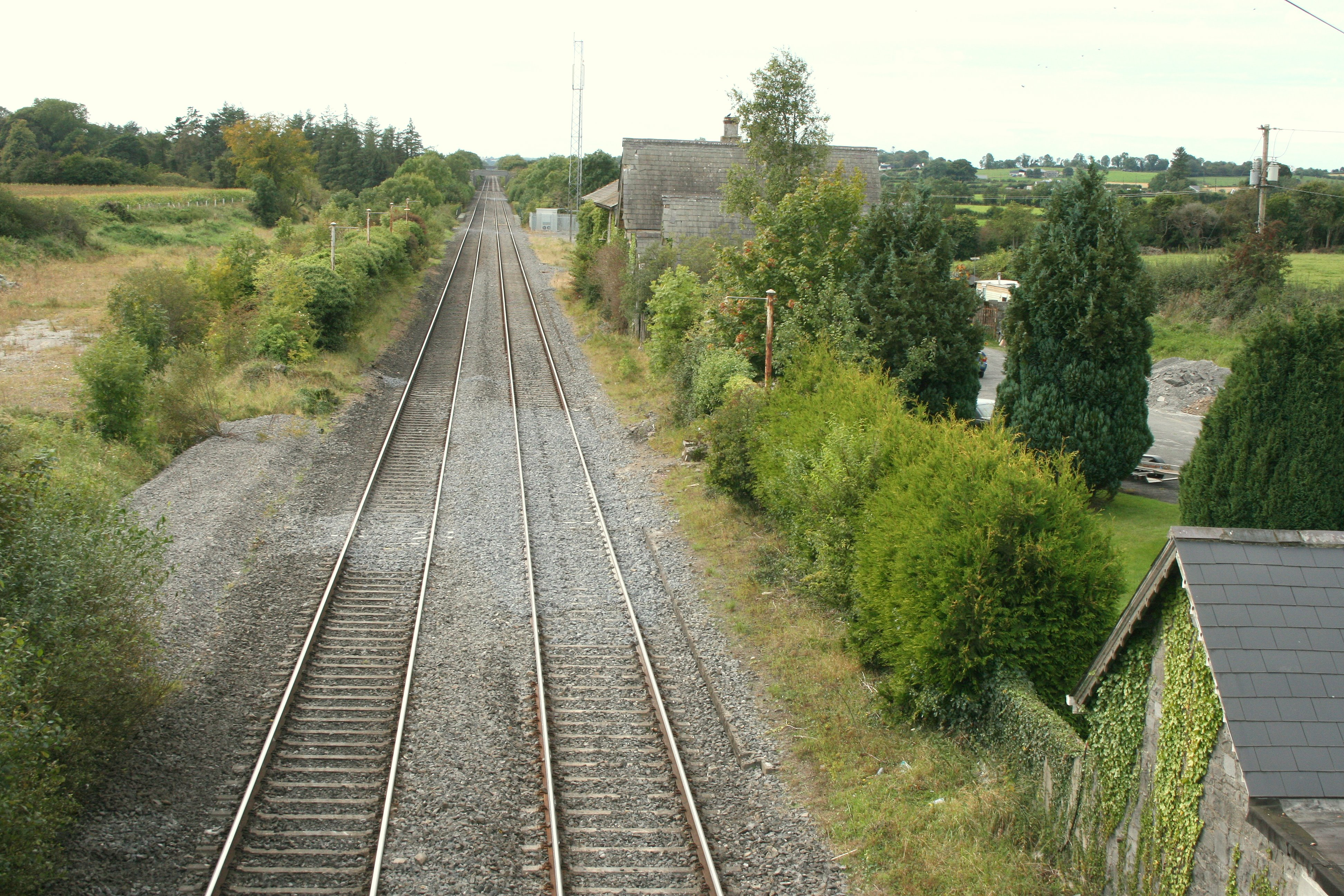
Irish-gauge railway at Kilbricken, on the Dublin–Cork railway line

Ireland's first railway, the Dublin and Kingstown, was built to 1,435 mm (4 ft 8 1/2 in) (later known as standard gauge). The Ulster Railway (UR), taking the Irish Railway Commission's advice, used 1,880 mm (6 ft 2 in). The Dublin and Drogheda Railway was proposed to be built to 1,575 mm (5 ft 2 in) gauge on the grounds of lower costs. The two broader gauges were not used anywhere else. Following complaints from the UR, the Board of Trade investigated the matter, and in 1843 decreed the use of 1,600 mm (5 ft 3 in).

This gauge was given legal status by the Regulating the Gauge of Railways Act 1846, which specified 4 ft 8.5 in (1.435 m) for Great Britain, 5 ft 3 in for Ireland.

The UR was re-gauged in 1846, at a cost of £19,000 (about £2,324,000 today), and the Dublin and Kingstown Railway in 1857 for £38,000 (about £4,579,000 today).

The Hill of Howth Tramway and the Dublin and Blessington Steam Tramway also adopted the 1,600 mm (5 ft 3 in) gauge. Dublin's Luas tram system, opened in 2004, uses 1,435 mm (4 ft 8 1/2 in) standard gauge.

== Narrow gauge ==
Numerous narrow-gauge systems were built, usually as three foot gauge railways (3 ft or 914 mm). Most are now closed, including one of the largest narrow-gauge systems, that of the County Donegal Railways Joint Committee. The Irish narrow gauge today survives as heritage railways in both the Republic and in Northern Ireland. Bord na Móna uses narrow gauge in the Midlands bogs as part of its peat transport network. There is also a private peat railway on the southern shores of Lough Neagh in Northern Ireland, operated by the Sunshine Peat Company.

== See also ==
- History of rail transport in Ireland
- Irish gauge
- List of narrow-gauge railways in Ireland
- Regulating the Gauge of Railways Act 1846
