= British Gauge War =

Intense competition between expanding railway companies in 19th-century Great Britain

The Gauge War (or Gauge Wars) was a figurative war of intense competition to control new territory, waged between expanding railway companies in Great Britain in the nineteenth century. The contest for which track gauge should become the standard carried with it the greater struggle for which companies and stakeholders would win or lose in commerce, controlling or commercially dominating rights of way.

The Gauge War was arguably the earliest format war between two similar but incompatible technologies.

== Origins ==
The Great Western Railway adopted the broad gauge of 7 ft 1/4 in (2,140 mm) at the outset, while competing railway companies adopted the gauge of 4 ft 8 1/2 in (1,435 mm), which later became standard gauge. As the railway companies sought to expand commercially and geographically, they wished to dominate areas of the country, hoping to exclude their competitors. The networks polarised into groups of broad gauge companies and of narrow gauge companies. The term narrow gauge at the time referred to 4 ft 8 1/2 in (1,435 mm) as well as any smaller size, all narrow relative to the broad gauge (whereas today it refers only to gauges strictly smaller than 1,435 mm (4 ft 8 1/2 in) standard gauge).

Proposed railway lines required authorisation by act of Parliament, and an act generally stipulated the track gauge for that line. When an independent line was promoted, the gauge used aligned the company to either the broad or narrow gauge companies. The success by one network and the failure by the other often implied the capture and loss respectively of territory far beyond the line under immediate examination.

== Resolution ==
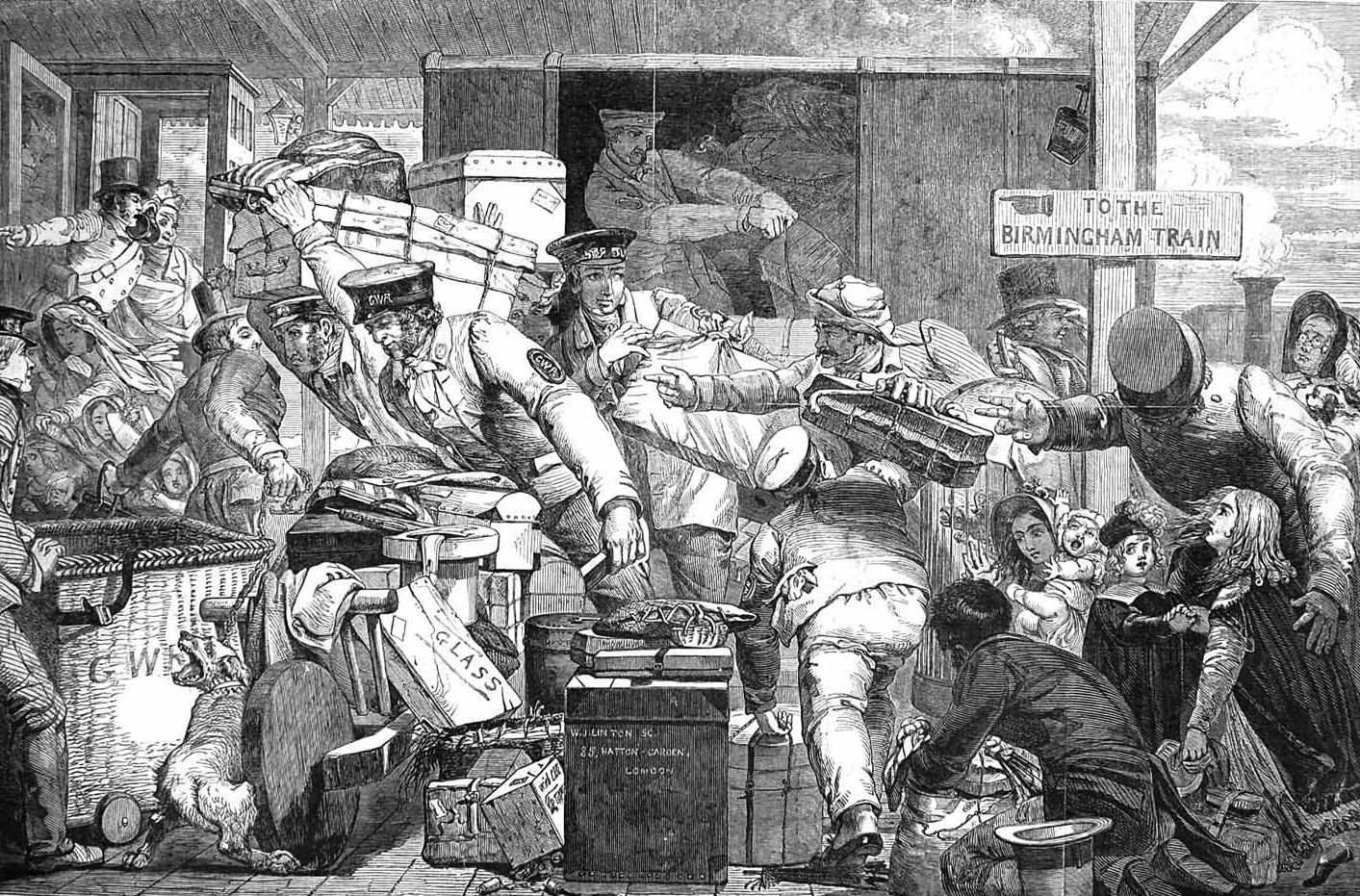
Cartoon from 1846, exaggerating the chaos of transhipment between gauges at Gloucester for political effect

A rail system with two gauges suffered from inefficiency where a break of gauge occurred. Various alternatives to costly transloading were proposed in the early era of railways, including rollbocks, transporter wagons, dual gauge, and even containerization or variable gauge axles. However, these were not actually implemented during the Gauge War in the 1840s, which resulted in the use of wasteful transloading. An early form of containerisation had been considered by Brunel; his sketchbook of 10 July 1845 has a drawing of a hoist to tranship loose bodies from broad to narrow gauge frames. Three months later, this method was referred to in Brunel's evidence to the Gauge Commission on 25 October 1845.

A royal commission was set up to study the issue and report its recommendations. The report informed the Regulating the Gauge of Railways Act 1846, which mandated standard gauge for all new railway construction except in the southwest of England and certain lines in Wales. However, building new broad gauge lines was still legal if an act of Parliament permitted an exception for a new line. The broad gauge thus continued in common use in the West of England for several more decades.

== See also ==
The topic is further examined in articles describing specific railways:

- from the Great Western Railway point of view: Great Western Railway § Brunel's 7-foot gauge and the "gauge war"
- from the London and South Western Railway: London and South Western Railway § Gauge wars

== Bibliography ==
=== Works cited ===
- Rolt, L. T. C. (1989) [1957]. Isambard Kingdom Brunel. Prentice Hall Press. ISBN 978-0-582-10744-1.
- Sidney, Samuel, ed. (1971) [1846]. Extracts from 'Gauge evidence', 1845 and [sic] the history and prospects of the railway system. Wakefield; Leeds: S.R. Publishers; Turntable Enterprises. ISBN 978-0-85409-723-4.

=== Further reading ===
- E T MacDermot, History of the Great Western Railway, vol I, published by the Great Western Railway, London, 1927
- R A Williams, The London & South Western Railway, volume 1, David & Charles, Newton Abbot, 1968
