= Standard-gauge railway =

Railway track gauge (1435 mm)

A standard-gauge railway is a railway with a track gauge of 1,435 mm (4 ft 8 1/2 in). The standard gauge is also called Stephenson gauge (after George Stephenson), international gauge, UIC gauge, uniform gauge, normal gauge in Europe (excluding the Iberian peninsula), and SGR in East Africa. It is the most widely used track gauge around the world, with about 60% of the lines in the world using it.

All high-speed rail lines use standard gauge except those in Russia, Finland, Uzbekistan, and some line sections in Spain. The distance between the inside edges of the heads of the rails is defined to be 1,435 mm except in the United States, Canada, and on some heritage British lines, where it is defined in U.S. customary/British Imperial units as exactly "four feet eight and one half inches", which is equivalent to 1,435.1 mm.

== History ==
As railways developed and expanded, one of the key issues was the track gauge (the distance, or width, between the inner sides of the rail heads) to be used, as the wheels of the rolling stock (locomotives, cars, etc.) must match this distance. Different railways used different gauges, and where track of different gauges met – a "gauge break" – loads had to be unloaded from one set of rail cars and reloaded onto another, a time-consuming and expensive process. The result was the adoption throughout a large part of the world of a "standard gauge" of 1,435 mm (4 ft 8 1/2 in), allowing interconnectivity and interoperability.

=== Origins ===
A popular legend that has circulated since at least 1937 traces the origin of the 1,435 mm (4 ft 8 1/2 in) gauge even further back than the coalfields of northern England, pointing to the evidence of rutted roads marked by chariot wheels dating from the Roman Empire. (Note: The gaps in the pedestrian crossings in Pompeii could give credence or otherwise to this statement, but no relevant studies appear to have been made.) Snopes categorised this legend as "false", but commented that it "is perhaps more fairly labeled as 'Partly true, but for trivial and unremarkable reasons.'" The historical tendency to place the wheels of horse-drawn vehicles around 5 ft (1,524 mm) apart probably derives from the width needed to fit a carthorse in between the shafts. Research, however, has been undertaken to support the hypothesis that "the origin of the standard gauge of the railway might result from an interval of wheel ruts of prehistoric ancient carriages".

In addition, while road-travelling vehicles are typically measured from the outermost portions of the wheel rims, it became apparent that for vehicles travelling on rails, having main wheel flanges that fit inside the rails is better, thus the minimum distance between the wheels (and, by extension, the inside faces of the rail heads) was the important one.

A standard gauge for horse railways never existed, but rough groupings were used; in the north of England none was less than 4 ft (1,219 mm). Wylam colliery's system, built before 1763, was 5 ft (1,524 mm), as was John Blenkinsop's Middleton Railway; the old 4 ft (1,219 mm) plateway was relaid to 5 ft (1,524 mm) so that Blenkinsop's engine could be used. Others were 4 ft 4 in (1,321 mm) (in Beamish) or 4 ft 7 1/2 in (1,410 mm) (in Bigges Main (in Wallsend), Kenton, and Coxlodge).

=== Stone block sleepers ===
Early tramways used pairs of stone blocks, which meant that the feet of horses did not trip over obstacles in the middle of the track. However, timber sleepers, which could cause the feet of horses to trip, held the gauge better.

=== Pioneer gauges ===
English railway pioneer George Stephenson spent much of his early engineering career working for the coal mines of County Durham. He favoured 4 ft 8 in (1,422 mm) for wagonways in Northumberland and Durham, and used it on his Killingworth line. The Hetton and Springwell wagonways also used this gauge.

Stephenson's Stockton and Darlington railway (S&DR) was built primarily to transport coal from mines near Shildon to the port at Stockton-on-Tees. Opening in 1825, the initial gauge of 4 ft 8 in (1,422 mm) was set to accommodate the existing gauge of hundreds of horse-drawn chaldron wagons that were already in use on the wagonways in the mines. The railway used this gauge for 15 years before a change was made, debuting around 1850, to the 1,435 mm (4 ft 8 1/2 in) gauge. The historic Mount Washington Cog Railway, the world's first mountain-climbing rack railway, is still in operation in the 21st century, and has used the earlier 4 ft 8 in (1,422 mm) gauge since its inauguration in 1868.

George Stephenson introduced the 1,435 mm (4 ft 8 1/2 in) gauge (including a belated extra 1/2 in (13 mm) of free movement to reduce binding on curves) for the Liverpool and Manchester Railway, authorised in 1826 and opened 30 September 1830. The extra half inch was not regarded at first as very significant, and some early trains ran on both gauges daily without compromising safety.

The success of this project led to Stephenson and his son Robert being employed to engineer several other larger railway projects. Thus the 4 ft 8 1/2 in (1,435 mm) gauge became widespread and dominant in Britain. Robert was reported to have said that if he had had a second chance to choose a gauge, he would have chosen one wider than 4 ft 8 1/2 in (1,435 mm). "I would take a few inches more, but a very few".

During the "gauge war" with the Great Western Railway, standard gauge was called "narrow gauge", in contrast to the Great Western's 7 ft 1/4 in (2,140 mm) broad gauge. The modern use of the term "narrow gauge" for gauges less than standard did not arise for many years, until the first such locomotive-hauled passenger railway, the Ffestiniog Railway, was built.

=== Gauge in Ireland ===
Ireland built its first railway with standard 1435mm gauge, but switched to 1600mm gauge after a decree from the Board of Trade.

=== Early example ===
An early example of 1435mm gauge was at Willington Colliery, a 3-mile line running to the River Tyne.

=== Adoption ===
In 1845, in the United Kingdom of Great Britain and Ireland, a Royal Commission on Railway Gauges reported in favour of a standard gauge. The subsequent Gauge Act ruled that new passenger-carrying railways in Great Britain should be built to a standard gauge of 4 ft 8 1/2 in (1,435 mm), and those in Ireland to a new standard gauge of 5 ft 3 in (1,600 mm). In Great Britain, Stephenson's gauge was chosen on the grounds that existing lines of this gauge were eight times longer than those of the rival 7 ft or 2,134 mm (later 7 ft 1/4 in or 2,140 mm) gauge adopted principally by the Great Western Railway. It allowed the broad-gauge companies in Great Britain to continue with their tracks and expand their networks within the "Limits of Deviation" and the exceptions defined in the Act.

After an intervening period of mixed-gauge operation (tracks were laid with three rails), the Great Western Railway finally completed the conversion of its network to standard gauge in 1892. In North East England, some early lines in colliery (coal mining) areas were 4 ft 8 in (1,422 mm), while in Scotland some early lines were 4 ft 6 in (1,372 mm). The British gauges converged starting from 1846 as the advantages of equipment interchange became increasingly apparent. By the 1890s, the entire network was converted to standard gauge.

The Royal Commission made no comment about small lines narrower than standard gauge (to be called "narrow gauge"), such as the Ffestiniog Railway. Thus it permitted a future multiplicity of narrow gauges in the UK. It also made no comments about future gauges in British colonies, which allowed various gauges to be adopted across the colonies.

Parts of the United States, mainly in the Northeast, adopted the same gauge, because some early trains were purchased from Britain. The American gauges converged, as the advantages of equipment interchange became increasingly apparent. Notably, all the 5 ft (1,524 mm) broad gauge track in the South was converted to "almost standard" gauge 4 ft 9 in (1,448 mm) over the course of two days beginning on 31 May 1886. See Track gauge in the United States.

In continental Europe, France and Belgium adopted a 1,500 mm (4 ft 11 1/16 in) gauge (measured between the midpoints of each rail's profile) for their early railways. The gauge between the interior edges of the rails (the measurement adopted from 1844) differed slightly between countries, and even between networks within a country (for example, 1,440 mm or 4 ft 8 11/16 in to 1,445 mm or 4 ft 8 7/8 in in France). The first tracks in Austria and in the Netherlands had other gauges (1,000 mm or 3 ft 3 3/8 in in Austria for the Donau Moldau line and 1,945 mm or 6 ft 4 9/16 in in the Netherlands for the Hollandsche IJzeren Spoorweg-Maatschappij), but for interoperability reasons (the first rail service between Paris and Berlin began in 1849, first Chaix timetable) Germany adopted standard gauges, as did most other European countries.

The modern method of measuring rail gauge was agreed in the first Berne rail convention of 1886.

== Early railways by gauge ==
=== Non-standard gauge ===
Name	Authorised	Opened	Gauge
Monkland and Kirkintilloch Railway	1824	1825	4 ft 6 in (1,372 mm)
Dundee and Newtyle Railway	1829	1831	4 ft 6 1/2 in (1,384 mm)
Eastern Counties Railway	1836, 4 July	1839, 20 June	5 ft (1,524 mm)
London and Blackwall Railway	1838, 28 July	1840	5 ft 1/2 in (1,537 mm)
Dundee and Arbroath Railway	1836, 19 May incorporated	1838, October	5 ft 6 in (1,676 mm); Until standardised in 1847
Arbroath and Forfar Railway	1836, 19 May incorporated	1838, November	5 ft 6 in (1,676 mm)
Northern and Eastern Railway	1836, 4 July	1840, 15 September	5 ft (1,524 mm)
Aberdeen Railway	1845	1848	5 ft 6 in (1,676 mm); Until standardised
Great Western Railway	1835	1838	7 ft 1/4 in (2,140 mm); Until standardised
Ulster Railway	1836	1839	6 ft 2 in (1,880 mm); Until 5ft 3in

=== Almost standard gauge ===
- The Huddersfield Corporation Tramways, used 4 ft 7 3/4 in (1,416 mm)
- The Portsdown and Horndean Light Railway, used 4 ft 7 3/4 in (1,416 mm)
- The Portsmouth Corporation Transport, used 4 ft 7 3/4 in (1,416 mm)
- The Killingworth colliery railway, used 4 ft 8 in (1,422 mm).
- The Hetton colliery railway, opened 1822, used 4 ft 8 in (1,422 mm).
- The Stockton and Darlington Railway, authorised 1821, opened 1825, used 4 ft 8 in (1,422 mm).
- The New Orleans and Carrollton Railroad used 4 ft 8 in (1,422 mm)
- The Pontchartrain Railroad used 4 ft 8 in (1,422 mm)
- The trams in Nuremberg nominally used 1,432 mm (4 ft 8 3/8 in) during much of their existence, but have since been converted to standard gauge in name as well as fact.

=== Standard gauge ===
Name	Authorised	Opened	Remarks
Baltimore and Ohio Railroad	1827	1830	13-mile section Baltimore – Elliot's Mill started revenue operation with horse-drawn cars on 24 May 1830.
Liverpool and Manchester Railway	1824	1830	
Saint-Étienne–Lyon railway	1826	1833	All early French railways (including St-Étienne – Andrezieux, authorised 1823, opened 1827) had a French Gauge of 1,500 mm (4 ft 11 1/16 in) between rail axes, compatible with early standard gauge tolerances)
Dublin and Kingstown Railway	1831	1834 (passenger traffic)	converted to 5 ft 3in in 1857
Newcastle & Carlisle Railway	1829	1834	Isolated from LMR
Grand Junction Railway	1833	1837	Connected to LMR
London and Birmingham Railway	1833	1838	Connected to LMR
Manchester and Birmingham Railway	1837	1840	Connected to LMR
Birmingham and Gloucester Railway	1836	1840	Connected to LMR
London and Southampton Railway	1834	1840	
London and Brighton Railway	1837	1841	
South Eastern Railway	1836	1844	
Australia (NSW, VIC, SA)	1848	1854	Original recommendation from London

=== Small deviations from standard gauge ===
- The Manchester and Leeds Railway, authorised on 4 July 1836, used 4 ft 9 in (1,448 mm).
  - The 4 ft 9 in (1,448 mm) railways were intended to take 4 ft 8 1/2 in (1,435 mm) gauge vehicles and allow a (second) running tolerance.
- The Chester and Birkenhead Railway, authorised on 12 July 1837, used 4 ft 9 in (1,448 mm).
- The London and Brighton Railway, authorised on 15 July 1837, used 4 ft 9 in (1,448 mm).
- The Manchester and Birmingham Railway, authorised on 30 June 1837, used 4 ft 9 in (1,448 mm).
- The Pennsylvania Railroad originally used 4 ft 9 in (1,448 mm)
- The trams in Dresden, authorised in 1872 as horsecars, used 1,440 mm (4 ft 8 11/16 in) gauge vehicles. Converted to 600 V DC electric trams in 1893, they now use 1,450 mm (4 ft 9 3/32 in); both gauges are within the tolerance for standard gauge.
- The Ohio gauge of 4 ft 10 in (1,473 mm)

=== Dual gauge ===
- Cheltenham and Great Western Union Railway, authorised 1836, opened 1840, dual gauge 1843 4 ft 8 1/2 in (1,435 mm) standard gauge and 7 ft 1/4 in (2,140 mm).

=== Initially standard gauge ===
Several lines were initially built as standard gauge but were later converted to another gauge for cost or for compatibility reasons.

- South Africa became 1,067 mm (3 ft 6 in)
- Thailand became 1,000 mm (3 ft 3 3/8 in)
- Indonesia became 1,067 mm (3 ft 6 in)
- Ireland became 1,600 mm (5 ft 3 in) – Dublin and Kingstown Railway
- Australia became 1,600 mm (5 ft 3 in) – Victoria & South Australia – partly converted to 1,435 mm (4 ft 8 1/2 in) or closed
- India became 1,676 mm (5 ft 6 in) – initial freight lines
- some private Japanese railways

== Modern almost standard gauge railways ==
- The Toronto Transit Commission uses a Toronto gauge of 4 ft 10 7/8 in (1,495 mm) on its streetcar and heavy-rail subway lines, which was actually closer to 1,520 mm (4 ft 11 27/32 in) gauge.
  - The Toronto Transit Commission light-metro lines and light-rail lines (whether existing, under construction or proposed) use standard gauge.
- Trams in Leipzig, Germany use 1,458 mm (4 ft 9 13/32 in).
- Trams in Dresden, Germany use 1,450 mm (4 ft 9 3/32 in).
- 1,445 mm (4 ft 8 7/8 in) gauge is in use on several urban rail transit systems in Europe:
  - Trams in Italy
  - Madrid Metro (only metro system. Light rail system uses standard gauge.)
- The MTR in Hong Kong uses 1,432 mm (4 ft 8 3/8 in) gauge on lines owned by the MTR Corporation. However, lines formerly operated (but which continue to be owned) by the Kowloon-Canton Railway Corporation, including the Light Rail network, use 1,435 mm (4 ft 8 1/2 in) gauge. New lines and extensions to the MTR after 2014 use 1,435 mm (4 ft 8 1/2 in) gauge, including the South Island line, Kwun Tong line extension and West Island line.
- The Bucharest Metro uses 1,432 mm (4 ft 8 3/8 in) gauge.
- The Washington Metro uses 4 ft 8 1/4 in (1,429 mm), 1/4 in (6 mm) narrower than standard gauge.
- The Mount Washington Cog Railway, the world's oldest mountain-climbing rack-and-pinion railway, uses a 4 ft 8 in (1,422 mm) gauge.

== Railways ==
Country/territory	Railway	Notes
Albania	National rail network	677 km (421 mi)
Algeria	National rail network; Algiers Metro, Algiers tramway, Constantine tramway, Oran tramway, Oran Metro	3,973 km (2,469 mi)
Angola		80 km (50 mi)
Argentina	General Urquiza Railway (except for Ferrocarril Económico Correntino, which used 600 mm or 1 ft 11 5/8 in before its closing); Buenos Aires Underground; Metrotranvía Mendoza; Tren de la Costa	Other major lines are mostly 1,676 mm (5 ft 6 in) broad gauge, with the exception of the 1,000 mm (3 ft 3 3/8 in) metre gauge General Belgrano Railway. Further information: Rail transport in Argentina
Australia	Australian Rail Track Corporation; Pilbara Railways; Sydney Trains; Sydney Metro; Sydney Light Rail; Melbourne Suburban Rail Loop (under construction); Newcastle Light Rail; Parramatta Light Rail; NSW TrainLink; Melbourne trams; Adelaide Metro trams; Gold Coast tram; Canberra Metro; Victorian Trains (Melbourne–Albury via Moonee Valley, Melbourne–Adelaide via Gheringhap, Dimboola, Rainbow line, Yelta line, Maryborough–Mildura)	Further information: Rail gauge in Australia 17,544 km (10,901 mi) out of an all-gauges total of 31,213 kilometres (19,395 mi) South Australia in May 1854 and Victoria in September 1854 opened Australia's first public railways, built to the 1600 mm (5 ft 3 in) "Irish" broad gauge. New South Wales, having earlier agreed on broad gauge, subsequently built to the standard gauge. On the main Sydney–Melbourne inter-capital route, trains had to stop at the border and passengers and freight transferred to another train – a situation only rectified by standardising the Albury–Melbourne section in 1962.
Austria	Österreichische Bundesbahnen	4,859 km (3,019 mi) The Semmering railway has UNESCO World Heritage Site status.
Bangladesh	Dhaka Metro Rail	20.1 km (12.5 mi)
Belgium	NMBS/SNCB, Brussels Metro and tramway	NMBS/SNCB 3,619 km (2,249 mi) Brussels Metro 40 km (25 mi) Trams in Brussels 140 km (87 mi)
Bolivia	Mi Tren	42 km (26.1 mi)
Bosnia and Herzegovina	Željeznice Federacije Bosne i Hercegovine and Željeznice Republike Srpske; Sarajevo tramways	Further information: Rail transport in Bosnia and Herzegovina 1,032 km (641 mi)
Brazil	Estrada de Ferro do Amapá; from Uruguaiana to the border with Argentina and from Santana do Livramento to the border with Uruguay (both mixed gauge 1,435 mm and 1,000 mm or 3 ft 3 3/8 in metre gauge); remaining tracks at Jaguarão, Rio Grande do Sul (currently inoperable); Rio de Janeiro Light Rail; São Paulo Metro lines 4 and 5; Salvador Metro; Baixada Santista Light Rail	205.5 km (127.7 mi)
Bulgaria	National Railway Infrastructure Company (NRIC); Bulgarian State Railways (BDZ); Sofia Underground; part of Sofia Tramway system	
Canada	National rail network (including commuter rail operators like GO Transit, West Coast Express, Exo and Union Pearson Express)	49,422 km (30,709 mi) The Toronto Transit Commission uses 4 ft 10 7/8 in (1,495 mm) gauge on its streetcar and subway lines.
China	National rail network	103,144 km (64,091 mi)
Chile	Santiago Metro	140.8 km (87 mi)
Croatia	HŽ Infrastruktura	Further information: Rail transport in Croatia
Colombia	Metro de Medellín, Tren del Cerrejón, Metro de Bogotá	
Cuba	Ferrocarriles de Cuba	4,266 km (2,651 mi)
Czech Republic	Správa železnic; Prague Metro; all tram systems in the country (Liberec has dual gauge 1,000/1,435 mm, with one metre-gauge only for heritage rolling stock on a small part of the network); funicular in Prague	9,478 km (5,889 mi)
Denmark	Banedanmark and Copenhagen Metro	
Djibouti	Addis Ababa-Djibouti Railway	100 km (62 mi)
Egypt	Egyptian National Railways	
Estonia	Rail Baltica	Standard-gauge Rail Baltica railway is under construction and is scheduled to be completed by 2030. Cost studies have been undertaken for a potential overhaul of entire rail network to standard gauge.
Ethiopia	Addis Ababa-Djibouti Railway; Addis Ababa Light Rail	659 km (409 mi) Other standard gauge lines under construction.
Finland	Tampere tram; Helsinki–Tallinn Tunnel (planned); Rail Baltica (planned)	
France	SNCF, RATP (on RER lines)	
Gabon	Trans-Gabon Railway	669 km (416 mi)
Germany	Deutsche Bahn, numerous local public transport providers	43,468 km (27,010 mi)
Georgia	Georgian Railway 1,435 mm (4 ft 8 1/2 in) standard gauge constructed between Akhalkalaki to Karstakhi for Baku-Tbilisi-Kars Railway	26.142 km (16.244 mi)
Ghana	Tema-Mpakadan Railway Line Takoradi to Sekondi Route, is currently operated by the Ghana Railway Company Limited. Kojokrom-Sekondi Railway Line (The Kojokrom-Sekondi line is a branch line that joins the Western Railway Line at Kojokrom)	New and extended SGR are being built, with some dual gauge.
Greece	Hellenic Railways Organisation (operated by TrainOSE)	All modern Greek networks, except in the Peloponnese
Holy See		1 km (0.62 mi)
Hong Kong	MTR (former KCR network – East Rail line, Tuen Ma line, Light Rail)	Other MTR lines use 1,432 mm (4 ft 8 3/8 in) instead of 4 ft 8 1/2 in
Hungary	MÁV, GySEV; Budapest Metro; HÉV (suburban railway); Tram systems in Budapest, Debrecen, Miskolc, Szeged; Budapest Cog-wheel Railway; Budapest Castle Hill Funicular	
India	Only used for rapid transit and tram, Bengaluru Metro, Chennai Metro, Delhi Metro (Phase 2 onwards), Rapid Metro Gurgaon, Hyderabad Metro, Jaipur Metro, Kochi Metro, Kolkata Metro, Lucknow Metro, Mumbai Metro, Nagpur Metro, Navi Mumbai Metro, Pune Metro, Delhi–Meerut RRTS, and Trams in Kolkata. The under-construction Mumbai–Ahmedabad high-speed rail corridor based on the Shinkansen also uses standard gauge. All under-construction and future high-speed rail and rapid transit systems would be in standard gauge.	128,305 km (79,725 mi) Indian nationwide rail system (Indian Railways) uses 1,676 mm (5 ft 6 in) broad gauge. 99.45% of the broad gauge network is electrified.
Indonesia	Aceh rail, Bali MRT (under construction), Jakarta LRT, Jabodebek LRT, Trans-Sulawesi Railway (Makassar-Parepare section), Jakarta MRT West-east line (planned), and Jakarta-Bandung high speed networks	The very first railway line in Indonesia which connects Semarang to Tanggung, which later extended to Yogyakarta was laid to standard gauge. Opened in 1867, it was mostly regauged to 1,067mm/3ft6in during Japanese occupation in 1943, while a short line in Semarang Harbor soldiered on until 1945. Standard gauge railway lines made a return in 2014 on experimental railway line in Aceh. The railway tracks of Java and Sumatra use 1,067 mm (3 ft 6 in).
Iran	Islamic Republic of Iran Railways	12,998 km (8,077 mi)
Iraq	Iraqi Republic Railways	485 km (301 mi)
Ireland	Transport Infrastructure Ireland	Luas in Dublin
Israel	Israel Railways; Jerusalem Light Rail; Tel Aviv Light Rail	
Italy	Ferrovie dello Stato	16,723 km (10,391 mi)
Japan	Shinkansen, JR Hokkaido Naebo Works (see Train on Train), Sendai Subway (Tōzai Line), Tokyo Metro (Ginza and Marunouchi lines), Toei Subway (Asakusa and Ōedo lines), Yokohama Municipal Subway (Blue and Green lines), Nagoya Municipal Subway (Higashiyama, Meijō, and Meikō lines), Kyoto Municipal Subway, Osaka Metro, Kobe Municipal Subway, Fukuoka City Subway (Nanakuma Line), Keisei Electric Railway (including Hokusō and Shin-Keisei lines), Keikyu Line, Kintetsu Railway (Osaka, Nara, Nagoya, Yamada, Kyoto, and Keihanna lines and their associated branches), Keihan Railway, Hankyu Railway, Kita-Osaka Kyuko Railway, Nose Electric Railway, Hanshin Railway, Sanyo Electric Railway, Takamatsu-Kotohira Electric Railroad (Kotoden), Nishi-Nippon Railroad (Tenjin Ōmuta, Dazaifu and Amagi lines)	4,251 km (2,641 mi), all electrified
Kenya	Mombasa-Nairobi Standard Gauge Railway	485 km (301 mi) Inaugurated 31 May 2017. An extension from Nairobi to Naivasha is under construction. A further extension east to the Ugandan border is planned.
Kosovo	Trainkos	437 km (272 mi)
Laos	Boten–Vientiane railway	414 km (257 mi), Formally opened on 3 December 2021.
Latvia	Rail Baltica	Standard-gauge Rail Baltica railway is under construction and is scheduled to be completed by 2030.
Lebanon		All lines out of service and essentially dismantled
Libya	Network under construction	
Lithuania	Rail Baltica	First phase, from Kaunas to the Polish border, completed in 2015. The second phase, from Kaunas north to Tallinn and from Kaunas to Vilnius, is in the design and construction phase and scheduled to be completed by 2030.
Luxembourg	Société Nationale des Chemins de Fer Luxembourgeois	
Malaysia	Rapid KL; Express Rail Link; MRL East Coast Rail Link (under construction); Kuala Lumpur–Singapore High Speed Rail (planned)	998 km (620 mi)
Mauritania	Mauritania Railway	704 km (437 mi)
Mexico	Further information: List of Mexican railroads	24,740 km (15,370 mi)
Monaco		
Montenegro	Željeznice Crne Gore	3
Morocco	Rail transport in Morocco	2,067 km (1,284 mi)
Nepal	Nepal Railways (all tracks except cross-border tracks with India are standard gauge)	Under-construction
Netherlands	Nederlandse Spoorwegen and regional railways.	
Nigeria	Lagos–Kano Standard Gauge Railway; Lagos Rail Mass Transit	Under construction; Abuja to Kaduna section operational.
North Korea	Railways of the DPRK	
North Macedonia	Macedonian Railways	
Norway	Norwegian National Rail Administration, Rail transport in Norway	4,087 km (2,540 mi)
Pakistan	To be used only for the rapid transit system, Lahore Metro	Pakistan's nationwide rail system (Pakistan Railways) uses 1,676 mm (5 ft 6 in) broad gauge. Any future additions to this system would also be in broad gauge.
Panama	Panama Railway; Panama Metro	Regauged from 5 ft (1,524 mm) in 2001
Paraguay	Ferrocarril Presidente Don Carlos Antonio López, now Ferrocarril de Paraguay S.A. (FEPASA)	36 km out of Asunción (used as a tourist steam line), plus 5 km from Encarnación to the border with Argentina, carrying mainly exported soy; the rest of the 441-km line awaits its fate, while redevelopment plans come and go with regularity. The section from west of Encarnación to north of San Salvador, plus the entire San Salvador–Abaí branch, have been dismantled by the railway itself and sold for scrap to raise funds.
Peru	Railway Development Corporation, Ferrocarril Central Andino (Callao–Lima–La Oroya–Huancayo and La Oroya–Cerro del Pasco lines), Ferrocarril del sur de Peru (operated by Peru Rail) Matarani–Arequipa–Puno and Puno–Cuzco, Ilo–Moquegua mining railway, Tacna–Arica (Chile) international line, (operated by Tacna Province), Lima electric suburban railway	1,603 km (996 mi)
Philippines	Operational: LRT 1, LRT 2, and MRT 3. Under construction: MRT 7, MRT 4, LRT 1 South/Cavite Extension, MMS, PNR SLH, PNR NSCR, and Mindanao Railway Phase 1. All current as of March 2022.	54.15 km (33.65 mi) operational, 899.6 km (559.0 mi) under construction, all electrified as of March 2022.
Philippines	Philippine National Railways network, future LRT and MRT Lines (proposed)	c. 4,600 km (2,900 mi), 1,159 km (720 mi) will be electrified. (Note: For the Philippine National Railways, 2,278 km (1,415 mi) for the Mindanao Railway, 296 km (184 mi) for the North–South Commuter Railway (NSCR), 298 km (185 mi) for NSCR extensions, 92 km (57 mi) for the Northeast Commuter Line to Cabanatuan, 581 to 639 km (361 to 397 mi) for the South Main Line rehabilitation, 71 km (44 mi) for the Subic–Clark Railway, 244 km (152 mi) for the San Jose–Tuguegarao line, and 175 km (109 mi) for the Tarlac–San Fernando line. Proposed MRT lines have a total length of 370 km (230 mi), discounting the Monorail Line 4. LRT Line 1 extension is 26 km (16 mi), while LRT Line 6's total proposed track length is 169 km (105 mi). All figures mentioned denote track length, not line or system length.)
Poland	Polskie Koleje Państwowe, Warsaw Metro, most tramway systems throughout the country	
Portugal	Braga and Porto (Guindais) funiculars, Lisbon Metro, Porto Metro (partly adapted from former 1,000 mm (3 ft 3 3/8 in) metre gauge; tracks), Metro Transportes do Sul light rail in Almada.	All other railways use 1,668 mm (5 ft 5 21/32 in) (broad gauge); some use 1,000 mm (3 ft 3 3/8 in) metre gauge; Decauville uses 500 mm (19 3/4 in) gauge. Planned and under construction high-speed railways to use 1,668 mm (5 ft 5 21/32 in) to maintain interoperability with the rest of the network.
Romania	Căile Ferate Române; Bucharest Metro; Tram systems in Botoșani, Brăila, Bucharest, Cluj-Napoca, Craiova, Galați, Ploiești and Timișoara	
Russia	Rostov-on-Don tramway, lines connecting Kaliningrad with Poland	
Rwanda	Isaka–Kigali Standard Gauge Railway	150 km (93 mi) New railway between Kigali and the Tanzanian town of Isaka is planned.
Saudi Arabia	Rail transport in Saudi Arabia	
Senegal	Train Express Regional Dakar-AIBD; Senegal–Gambia Railway (planned); Senegal–Guinea Bissau Railway (planned)	
Serbia	Serbian Railways	
Singapore	Mass Rapid Transit	203 km (126 mi)
Slovakia	Železnice Slovenskej republiky, Košice tramway system	
Slovenia	Slovenske železnice	
Somaliland	Dire Dawa Ethiopia - Berbera Port	proposed 2025
South Africa	Gautrain in Gauteng Province. Rest of country uses 1,067 mm (3 ft 6 in)	80 km (50 mi)
South Korea	KRNA	
Spain	AVE high-speed rail lines from Madrid to Seville, Málaga, Alicante, Saragossa, Barcelona (-Perthus), Orense, Toledo, Huesca, León and Valladolid, Barcelona Metro (L2, L3, L4, and L5 lines), Barcelona FGC (lines L6 and L7), and Metro Vallès (lines S1, S2, S5, and S55) All other railways use 1,668 mm (5 ft 5 21/32 in) (broad gauge) and/or 1,000 mm (3 ft 3 3/8 in) metre gauge.	3,622 km (2,251 mi)
Sweden	Swedish Transport Administration, Storstockholms Lokaltrafik (Stockholm Metro, commuter and light rail lines), tram networks in Gothenburg, Lund and Norrköping	
Switzerland	Swiss Federal Railways, BLS, Rigi Railways (rack railway)	SFR 3,134 km in standard gauge and 98 km metre gauge 449 km
Syria	Syrian Railways	2,052 km (1,275 mi)
Taiwan	Taiwan High Speed Rail; Taipei Rapid Transit System, Kaohsiung Metro, Taoyuan Airport MRT and Taichung MRT; Kaohsiung Circular light rail and Danhai light rail	604.64 km (376 mi)
Tanzania	Tanzania Standard Gauge Railway	300 km (186 mi) line from Dar es Salaam to Morogoro has been completed in April 2022 currently in live testing phase. Contract awarded in 2019 for a 422 km (262 mi) extension from Morogoro to Makutupora.
Thailand	BTS Skytrain, MRT, and Suvarnabhumi Airport Link; The State Railway of Thailand uses 1,000 mm (3 ft 3 3/8 in).	80 km (50 mi)
Tunisia	Northern part of the network	471 km (293 mi)
Turkey	Turkish State Railways (also operates Marmaray), metro networks, and tram networks	Some tram networks use 1,000 mm (3 ft 3 3/8 in) metre gauge. Further information: Rail transport in Turkey
Uganda	Uganda Standard Gauge Railway	Railway line from Kampala to the Kenyan border is planned.
United Arab Emirates	Rail transport in the United Arab Emirates	
United Kingdom (Great Britain)	Entire rail network in Great Britain (but not Ireland) since standardisation by the Regulating the Gauge of Railways Act 1846	Also used on all metro and tramway systems with the exception of the self-contained Glasgow Subway, which is 4 ft (1,219 mm).
United States	Modern national railroad network; see Track gauge in the United States; The Washington Metro uses 4 ft 8 1/4 in (1,429 mm) gauge, which is 6 mm (0.24 in) narrower than standard gauge.; The Bay Area Rapid Transit system uses 5 ft 6 in (1,676 mm).; The San Francisco cable car system uses 3 ft 6 in (1,067 mm).	129,774 km (80,638 mi)
Uruguay	National rail network	2,900 km (1,800 mi)
Vietnam	North of Hanoi; Hanoi Metro; Ho Chi Minh City Metro	178 km (111 mi). Includes dual gauge (standard/metre) to the Chinese border.

== Non-rail use ==
Several states in the United States had laws requiring road vehicles to have a consistent gauge to allow them to follow ruts in the road. Those gauges were similar to railway standard gauge.

== See also ==
- Standard Gauge (toy trains)
- List of track gauges § Standard gauge
- List of tram systems by gauge and electrification
- Loading gauge, the maximum height and width of railway vehicles
- Railway Regulation (Gauge) Act 1846
- Structure gauge, the extent that bridges, tunnels and other infrastructure can encroach on rail vehicles
- Track gauge
- 89mm from Europe a 1993 film about how one jurisdiction addresses the difference in gauge between another
- Narrow-gauge railway
- Broad-gauge railway

== Bibliography ==
- Allen, Geoffrey Freeman (1987). Jane's World Railways, 1987–88. Jane's Information. ISBN 978-0-71060848-2.
- Baxter, Bertran (1966). Stone Blocks and Iron Rails (Tramroads). Industrial Archaeology of the British Isles. Newton Abbot: David & Charles. ISBN 978-0-715340-04-2. OCLC 643482298.
- Jones, Robin (2013). The Rocket Men. Mortons Media. ISBN 978-1-90912827-9.
- Jones, Stephen K (2009). Brunel in South Wales. Vol. II: Communications and Coal. Stroud: The History Press. pp. 64–65. ISBN 978-0-75244912-8.
- Ogata, Masanori; Tsutsumi, Ichiro (2006). "Origin of the world's standard gauge of railway is in the interval of wheel ruts of ancient carriages". The International Conference on Business & Technology Transfer. 2006 (3): 98–103. doi:10.1299/jsmeicbtt.2006.3.0_98.
- Pomeranz, Kenneth; Topik, Steven (1999). The World that Trade Created: Society, Culture, and World Economy, 1400 to the Present. Armonk, NY: M.E. Sharpe. ISBN 978-0-7656-0250-3.
- Puffert, Douglas J (2009). Tracks across Continents, Paths through History: The Economic Dynamics of Standardization in Railway Gauge. University of Chicago Press. ISBN 978-0-226-68509-0.
- Setti, João Bosco (2008). Brazilian Railroads. Rio de Janeiro: Memória do Trem. ISBN 978-85-8609409-5 – via Google Books.
- Vaughan, A. (1997). Railwaymen, Politics and Money. London: John Murray. ISBN 978-0-7195-5150-5.
- Whishaw, Francis (1969) [1842, John Weale]. The Railways of Great Britain and Ireland: Practically Described and Illustrated. London: David & Charles; reprints: Newton Abbot. ISBN 978-0-7153-4786-7.
