= Bali Metro =

Planned rapid transit system in Indonesia

Bali Urban Subway

Overview
- Native name: Moda Raya Terpadu (MRT) Bali (Note: lit. "Bali Integrated Mass Mode")
- Area served: Denpasar metropolitan area (Note: "Serves on All Phase ")
- Locale: Bali, Indonesia
- Transit type: Rapid transit
- Number of lines: 4 (cancelled)

Operation
- Character: Underground

Technical
- System length: 29.5 km (18.3 mi) (under construction) over 60.0 km (37.3 mi) (preparation)
- Track gauge: 1,435 mm (4 ft 8 1/2 in) (standard gauge)
- Top speed: 100 km/h (underground section)

The Bali Mass Rapid Transit (Indonesian: Moda Raya Terpadu Bali; Bali MRT), or officially known as the Bali Urban Subway or Bali Metro, was a planned rapid transit system in Bali, Indonesia. In August 2026 Governor of Bali (I Wayan Koster) announced that the Metro system had been abandoned in favour of Light rail due to a lack of private investment.

It was part of a government plan to ease traffic within the Denpasar metropolitan area in a project called the Bali Provincial Government Urban Railway.

A groundbreaking ceremony was held in September 2024, but no construction had started between then and August 2026 when it was cancelled as noticed by journalists in April 2026. Line 1 connecting Ngurah Rai International Airport to Cemagi and Line 2 connecting Ngurah Rai International Airport to Nusa Dua was originally estimated to open in 2031.

== Background ==
Bali is the main tourist destination hub and largest population center of the Lesser Sunda Islands in Indonesia, harbouring 4.5 million inhabitants, of which nearly half are located in Denpasar metropolitan area. It is estimated that over 1 million residents and tourists commute daily in Denpasar metropolitan area each day. Transport issues are attracting increasing political attention with the government. Over 5.2 million international tourists visited Bali in 2023. Denpasar is the busiest entry port to Indonesia ahead of Jakarta and Batam. In 2019, around 1.3 million of foreign tourists came from Australia, 1.1 million from China, and 0.4 million from India. Meanwhile, 9.5 million domestic tourists visited Bali in 2023.

The idea of constructing an MRT in Bali appeared in 2022 after COVID-19 and recovery in tourism arrivals, because of congested and hazardous roads, and in popular and built-up areas, gridlock frustrates locals and tourists.

== Development ==
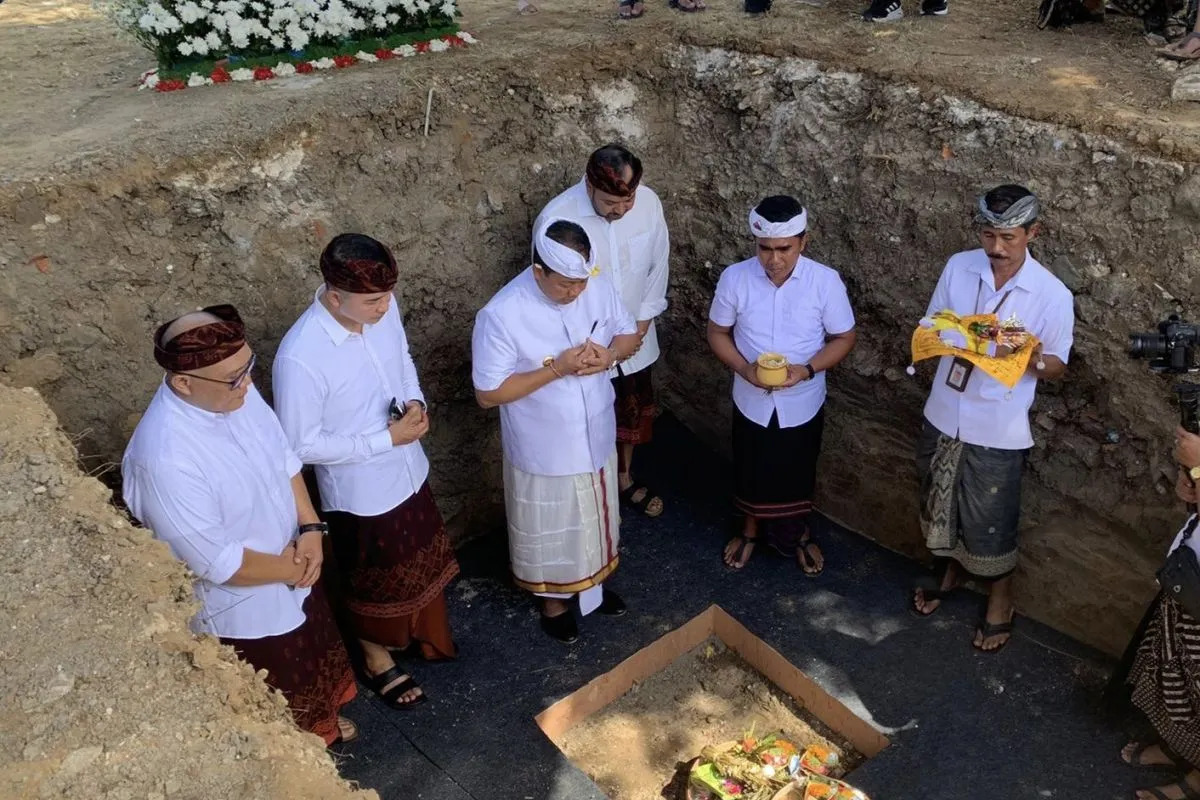
Officials holding a traditional ceremony for the groundbreaking of the Bali Urban Subway

=== First development ===
The process of developing the first line of the Bali MRT began when President Joko Widodo designated the system as a national project. In September 2024, the project was collaborated with CRCC for the MRT project. In total, the investment value for the first two lines reached US$10.8 billion and for the entire four lines is US$20 billion. Work on line 1 was expected to be slower due to rocky and hard underground conditions, compared to line 2 which was expected to be faster because of the limestone or alluvial soil conditions which makes it easier during the drilling process.

At the same time as the inauguration of the first phase of the North-South Line, President Joko Widodo also launched the construction of the first phase of the Ngurah Rai Airport–Cemagi Line and the Ngurah Rai Airport–Nusa Dua Line. This project, known as the Bali Provincial Government Urban Railway, includes four "Bali Urban Railway" MRT lines.

The routes initially planned, devised, and belonging to the Bali provincial government are:

1. MRT Ngurah Rai International Airport–Cemagi Line.
2. MRT Ngurah Rai International Airport–Nusa Dua Line.
3. MRT Sentral Parkir Kuta–Sanur Line.
4. MRT Renon–Sukawati–Ubud Line.

== Funding ==
=== Phase 1 ===
The project was entirely financed by the private sector on a business-to-business, meaning that the Subway Bali project was to be developed without any funding from state or regional budgets or loans guaranteed by the government, either at the central or regional levels. The investment for the first phase (Lines 1 and 2) amounts to US$10.8 billion.

=== Phase 2 ===
The investment value for Phase 2 (Lines 3 and 4) reached US$10 billion, bringing the total investment to US$20 billion.

== System network ==
The Bali MRT was expected to stretch across over 60 kilometres (37 mi), with 16.0 kilometres (9.9 mi) dedicated to the Ngurah Rai Airport–Cemagi line and 13.5 kilometres (8.4 mi) to the Ngurah Rai Airport–Nusa Dua line. Trains were to operate on the right-hand side, aligning with the current system used in Indonesian railways despite Indonesia’s left-hand road traffic system.

The following table lists the MRT lines that are planned as of September 2024.

Colour and line name	Line	Service commencement	Terminus	Stations	Length	Depot
Cancelled
Ngurah Rai Airport–Cemagi Line	1	2028 (Cancelled)	Ngurah Rai Airport; Cemagi	TBA	16.0 km (9.9 mi)	Ngurah Rai
Ngurah Rai Airport–Nusa Dua Line	2	2031 (Cancelled)	Ngurah Rai Airport; Nusa Dua	TBA	13.5 km (8.4 mi)	Ngurah Rai
Sentral Parkir Kuta–Sanur Line	3	Never Announced	Sentral Parkir Kuta; Sanur	TBA	TBA	TBA
Renon–Ubud Line	4	Never Announced	Renon; Ubud	TBA	TBA	TBA

== Criticism ==
The Bali Mass Rapid Transit project had been criticized due to delays and a lack of any visible construction on the project, despite the groundbreaking ceremony in 2024 (which has often been mislabelled as the start of construction). According to The Bali Sun, there had been no updates from either PT Sarana Bali Dwipa Jaya (SBDJ) or PT Bumi Indah Permai (BIP) on the construction of the metro system as of February 2026.

== See also ==
- Transport in Indonesia
- Transport in Jakarta
- Rail transport in Indonesia
- Jakarta MRT
- Jabodebek LRT
- Jakarta LRT
- Palembang LRT
