= History of rail transport in Brazil =

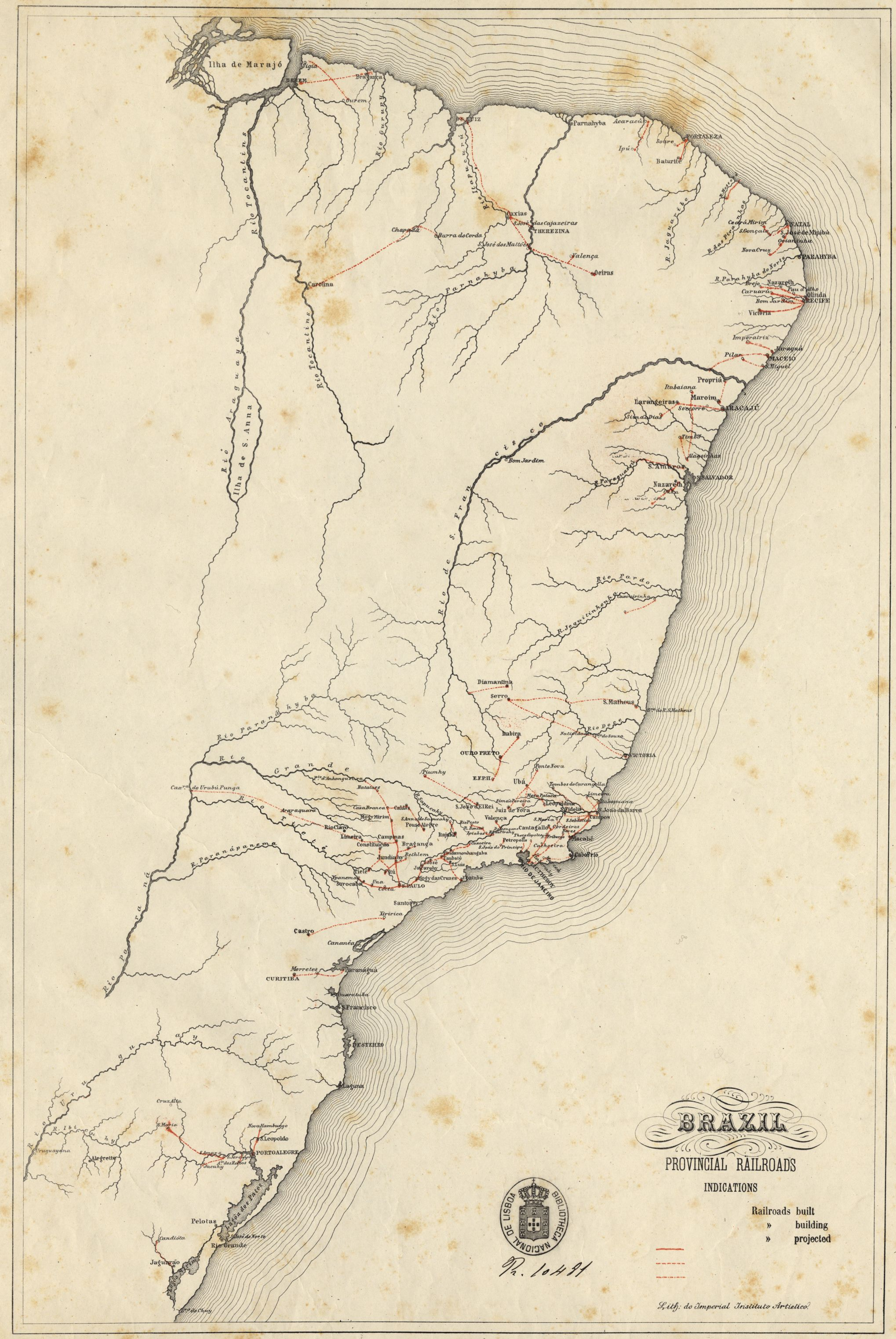
Provincial railroads in Brazil in the 19th century

The history of rail transport in Brazil dates back to 1835. In that year, Brazil's first Imperial decree was assigned to authorize a railroad which would connect Rio de Janeiro, Minas Gerais, Bahia, São Paulo and Rio Grande provinces and the main station would be in the Neutral Municipality (Corte) of Rio de Janeiro. However, the first railway line, with a gauge of 1,676 mm (5 ft 6 in), was completed between the Port of Mauá on Guanabara Bay in the then-Province of Rio de Janeiro and Fragoso, north of Guanabara Bay. Three steam locomotives made in England by William Fairbairn & Sons - of which the most famous is the "Baroneza", hauled the trains on this 14 km (8.7 mi) short line.

Soon afterwards, the line was extended to Raiz da Serra. Thirty years later, the Estrada de Ferro Príncipe do Grão Pará railway company further extended the line up into the mountains as far as Petrópolis. During this period, many railway lines were constructed and put into operation in Brazil by regional train operating companies.

The establishment of an overarching state railway company took place in 1957. On 16 March of that year, Rede Ferroviária Federal, Sociedade Anônima (RFFSA) was founded in a merger of 18 (later 19) individual regional companies. The RFFSA route network was used for both passenger and freight trains. Between 1996 and 1998, RFFSA was privatized, and in 2007 it was officially dissolved. During the privatization and dissolution process, the RFFSA's route network was regionalised and licensed for operation by private freight companies.

== See also ==
- History of rail transport
- History of Brazil
- Rail transport in Brazil
- Rio–São Paulo high-speed rail
