= Royal Commission on Railway Gauges =

Formal review of railway gauges in the United Kingdom (1845)

The United Kingdom Royal Commission on Railway Gauges was held in 1845 to choose between the 7 ft (2134 mm) broad gauge of the Great Western Railway and its associated companies and the so-called narrow gauge (now known as standard gauge) of 4 ft 8 1/2 in (1435 mm) that had been installed in most of the rest of the country. The situation in Ireland, where there were three gauges, was also considered.

The members of the commission were: J. M. F. Smith, G. B. Airy, and P. Barlow. John Fox Burgoyne gave evidence to the commission on the desirability of standardising the British railway gauge to assist with the movement of troops in the event of invasion. The commission in its final report, while recognising that broad gauge was technically superior, nevertheless recommended its abolition as the cost and difficulty of converting the majority of railways, which were narrow gauge, was too great.

Following the royal commission, the Railway Regulation (Gauge) Act 1846 (9 & 10 Vict. c. 57) was passed, which mandated all new railways to be constructed to 4 ft 8 1/2 in (1435 mm) in England, Scotland and Wales, and 5 ft 3 in (1600 mm) in Ireland. The Great Western Railway was allowed to continue with its broad gauge.

== Narrow gauges ==
Unlike Italy and France, which regulated the choice of narrow gauges, Britain did not, resulting in a large number of alternatives, including:

- 1 ft 11 1/2 in (597 mm) – earliest use 1836
- 2 ft (610 mm) – 1879
- 2 ft 3 in (686 mm) – 1859
- 2 ft 6 in (762 mm) – 1884
- 3 ft (914 mm) – 1873
- 3 ft 6 in (1,067 mm) – 1863
- several other rarely used gauges.

== See also ==
- Railway Regulation (Gauge) Act 1846
- Rail gauge in Australia
- Royal commission
