= CPCS Transcom =

Canada-based infrastructure development firm

CPCS Transcom Limited (commonly known as CPCS) is an international infrastructure development firm specialising in private sector participation in transportation and power infrastructure, operations, investment, policy and regulation. An Ottawa, Ontario-based company, CPCS operates in more than 80 countries worldwide, particularly in Africa and Southeast Asia. Established in 1996 via a merger of firms, Hickling Transcom and CPCS International, CPCS Transcom was recognized by the 1999 Canadian Information Productivity Awards for its "Comprehensive Information and Systems Core Business Strategy". CPCS is governed by a board of directors that includes a full complement of non-executive directors.

== Projects ==
Projects with which CPCS is associated include:

- Lagos Rail Mass Transit
- Privatization of Generation and Distribution Companies/Nigerian Power Sector Review
