= Railway Regulation (Gauge) Act 1846 =

Act of Parliament of the United Kingdom standardising railway gauges

Railway Regulation (Gauge) Act 1846 (Note: The citation of this act by this short title was authorised by section 1 of, and the first schedule to, the Short Titles Act 1896. Due to the repeal of those provisions it is now authorised by section 19(2) of the Interpretation Act 1978.)
- Act of Parliament
- Parliament of the United Kingdom
- Long title: An Act for regulating the Gauge of Railways.
- Citation: 9 & 10 Vict. c. 57
- Territorial extent: England and Wales; Scotland; Ireland; (Note: Section 1.)

Dates
- Royal assent: 18 August 1846
- Commencement: 18 August 1846
- Repealed: 29 July 1959
Other legislation
Amended by	Statute Law Revision Act 1875
Repealed by	Statute Law Revision Act 1959

Status: Repealed

Text of statute as originally enacted

The Railway Regulation (Gauge) Act 1846 (9 & 10 Vict. c. 57) or the Regulating the Gauge of Railways Act 1846 or the Gauge of Railways Act 1846 was an act of the Parliament of the United Kingdom, that was designed to standardise railway tracks. It was granted royal assent on 18 August 1846, and mandated that the track gauge – which was the distance between the two running rails' inner faces – of 4 feet 8 1/2 inches to be the standard for Great Britain and 5 feet 3 inches to be the standard for Ireland. (Note: The metric equivalents of the dimensions specified are 1435 and 1600 millimetres respectively.)

== Provisions ==
The act stipulated that:

...after the passing of this Act it shall not be lawful (except as herein-after excepted) to construct any Railway for the Conveyance of Passengers on any Gauge other than Four Foot Eight Inches and Half an Inch in Great Britain, and Five Feet Three Inches in Ireland...

== Assessment ==
The act continued legislative approval of the broad-gauge railways constructed by the Great Western Railway engineer Isambard Kingdom Brunel and endorsed the construction of several new broad-gauge lines, but restricted them to the south-west of England and to Wales. The act stated that these railways "shall be constructed on the Gauge of Seven Feet". (Note: Later, the distance between the rails was widened, for engineering reasons, to 7 ft 0 1/4, for which the metric equivalent is 2140 mm.) The resulting isolation of these lines ultimately contributed to the demise of the Great Western Railway broad-gauge system.

== Subsequent developments ==
The whole act was repealed by section 2 of, and the second schedule to, the Statute Law Revision Act 1959 (7 & 8 Eliz. 2. c. 68), which came into force on 29 July 1959.

== See also ==
- British Gauge War
- Track gauge in Ireland
- Standard gauge
