= Gauge Changing =

Gauge Changing may refer to:

- Axle exchange
- Bogie exchange
- Variable gauge
- Track gauge conversion
- Wheelset exchange
