= Ramsey car-transfer apparatus =

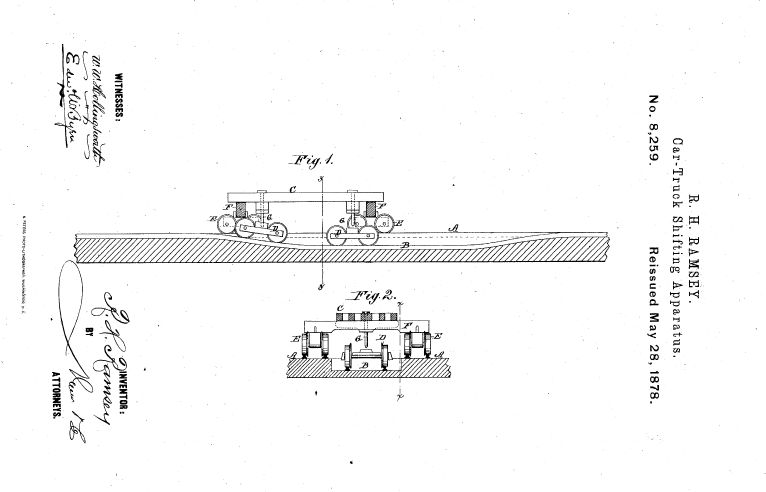
A drawing of the apparatus from the patent application

In railroad industry, the Ramsey car-transfer apparatus (Ramsey transfer) was a device to replace bogies on railroad cars to permit transfer of a train between railroad lines with different gauge.

The Ramsey transfer existed in a number of variations covered by several different patents. It was typically used to transfer cars between 6 ft (1,829 mm) broad gauge, 4 ft 8 1/2 in (1,435 mm) standard gauge and narrow gauge (usually 3 ft / 914 mm in width) track.

== Invention ==
It was invented and patented in 1876 by Robert Henry Ramsey as a simple and rapid device for removing trucks at repairing shops, and for transferring car-bodies between rail roads of different gauges.

== Operation ==
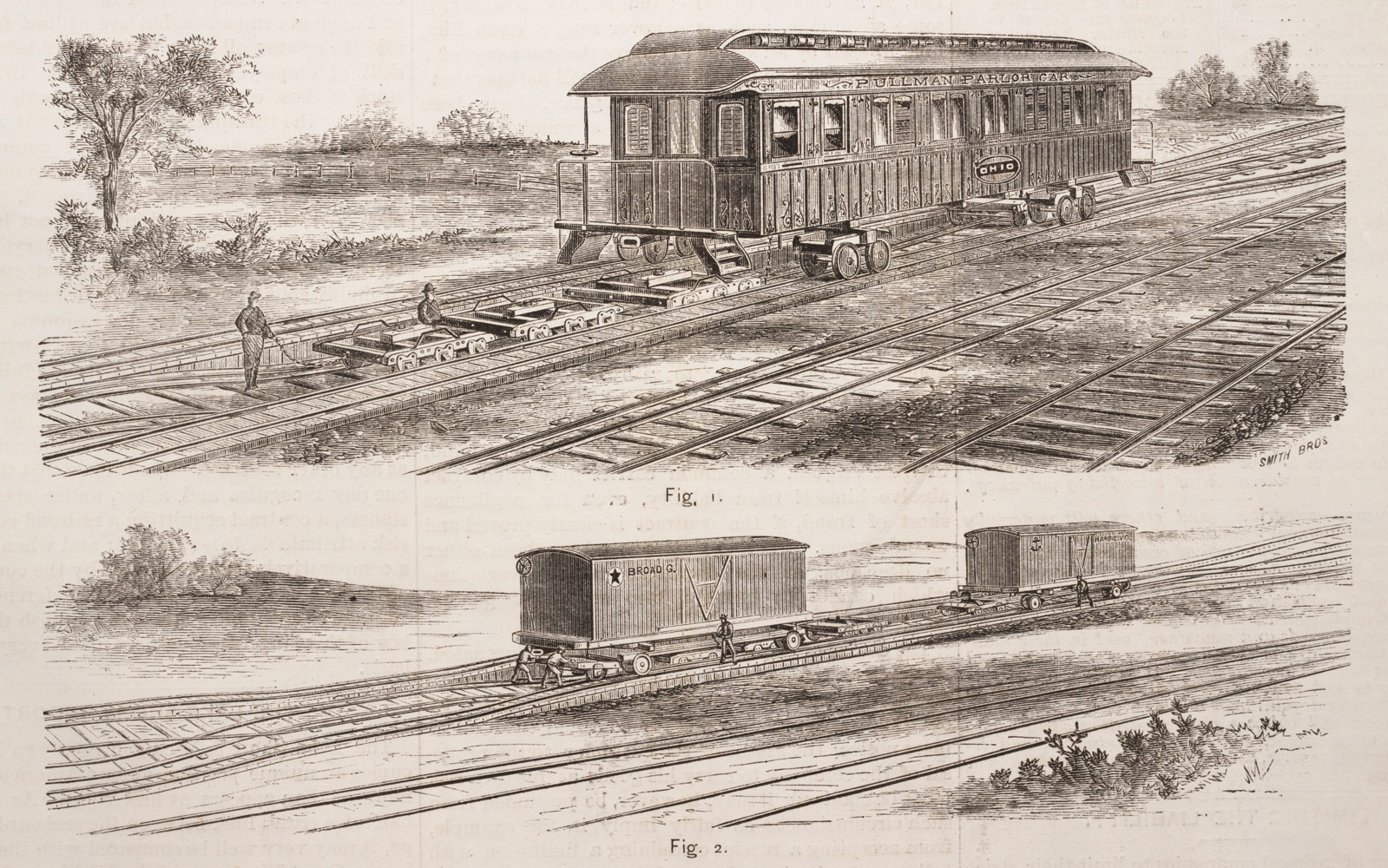
Ramsey's car-transfer apparatus

Two parallel tracks of 18 in (457 mm) were set approximately 9 feet (2.74 m) apart. Between these two tracks, the standard and narrow gauge tracks descended into a pit, one from each end of the pit, overlapping in the center and having a common center line. Beams resting on trucks riding on the 18-inch (457 mm) gauge tracks were inserted under the car to have its trucks changed. The car was then pushed over the pit, resting on the beams. This allowed the old trucks to slip off the center pins. The old trucks were pulled out of the pit and new trucks were pushed in from the opposite side. As the car passed over the opposite side of the pit, the new trucks were guided to fit on the center pins. The car now continued on its way, its load undisturbed.

== Speed ==
It was claimed that the entire procedure could be performed in less than eight minutes. However in 1851, this would have referred to cars without air brakes. More time would have been taken to deal with post 1880 cars with air brakes.

== Users ==
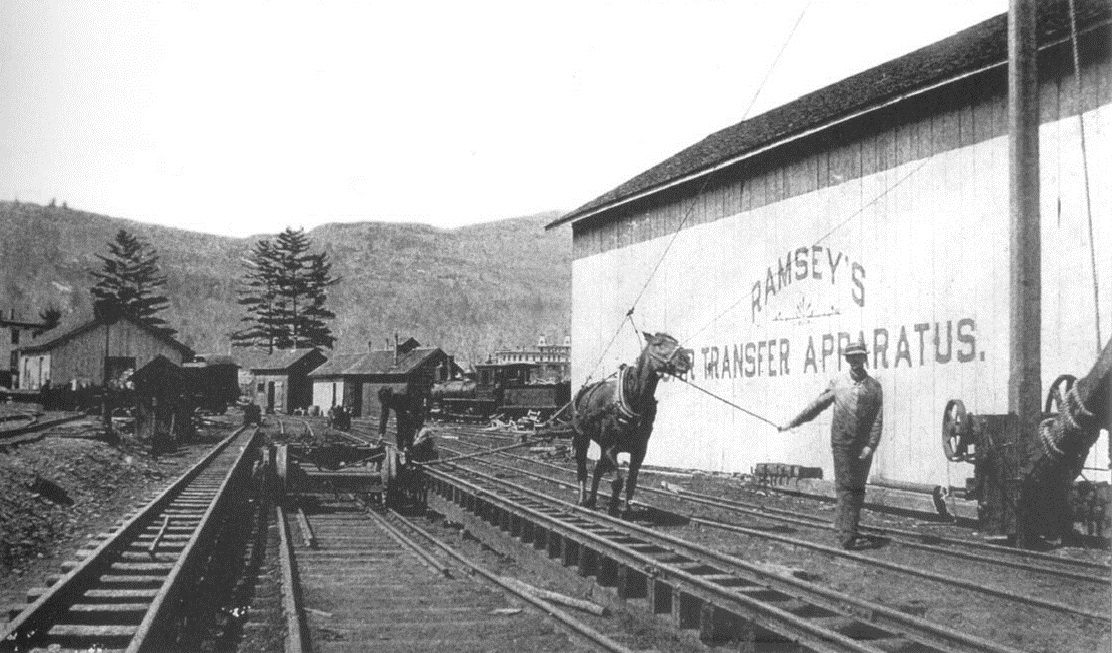
Ramsey's car-transfer apparatus used at Phoenicia in 1882

The Ligonier Valley Railroad was the first to use the method in 1878 in Latrobe, Pennsylvania. It was also used in the same year by the Rochester and State Line Railroad at its Salamanca junction with the Atlantic and Great Western Railroad, a 6 ft (1,829 mm) gauge line.

It was also adopted by the Lehigh Valley Railroad; Wilmington, Columbia and Augusta Railroad; W. C. Virginia Midland & Gt. S. Railroad; Atlantic and Great Western Railroad; Pittsylvania [sic] R. R.; Pittsburg Southern Railroad; Dayton, Covington & Toledo Railroad; Dayton & Southeastern R. R.; Memphis & Little Rock R. R. and many others. The East Broad Top Railroad, a coal rail road in Pennsylvania used it in its Mount Union Yard up to the closure in 1956.

Union Pacific Railroad (particularly along the Oregon Short Line Railroad) operated several Ramsey car-transfer apparatuses among various gauge breaks inherited from predecessor lines such as the Utah and Northern Railway and Utah Western Railway, in locations such as Salt Lake City, Utah, Ogden, Utah, and Pocatello, Idaho. In Ogden, Ramsey devices allowed interchange between the standard gauge Union Pacific and Central Pacific Railroad mainlines with narrow gauge routes on the Oregon Short Line and Denver & Rio Grande Western Railway. Union Pacific operated extensive interstate traffic using the Ramsey transfer, such as shipping narrow gauge coal cars originating on the Denver, South Park & Pacific Railroad to Butte, Montana with Ramsey transfers when needed to account for the gauge breaks.

The Ramsey devices along the Oregon Short Line were retired as narrow gauge routes were replaced with standard gauge, with the last narrow gauge transfers in Salt Lake City occurring in 1900 before the narrow gauge Utah & Nevada route was bypassed in 1900 to form the standard gauge line on what is now the Lynndyl Subdivision. On one occasion in 1900 prior to retirement, the Ramsey Transfer in Salt Lake City was used to lend narrow gauge Utah & Northern passenger cars to the Rio Grande Western, which ran an excursion to Park City, Utah over standard gauge rails on their Parley's Canyon route using narrow gauge rolling stock.

Ramsey car-transfer apparatuses were considered for use in Australia, which due to the lack of patent recognition between the United States of America and Colonial Australia at the time, resulted in members of the Parliament of South Australia discussing using an unlicensed copy of the Ramsey design on the nation's railways.

== Patents ==
- U.S. patent 178,079, 30 May 1876, Car Truck Shifting Apparatus
- U.S. patent RE8,259, 28 May 1878, Reissue of 178,079
- U.S. patent 204,087, 21 May 1878, Car Transfer Apparatus
- U.S. patent 304,562, 2 September 1884, Car and Freight Transfer Apparatus
- U.S. patent 304,563, 2 September 1884, Car and Freight Transfer Apparatus

== See also ==
- Bogie exchange
- Dual gauge
- Gauge conversion
- Rollbock
- Transporter wagon
- Variable gauge axles
- Wheelset
