= Keith Smith (engineer) =

Australian engineer (1915–2011)

Keith Archibald Smith, OBE, AM, MIE Aust, FCIT, (4 May 1915 – 16 July 2011) was an Australian engineer who was Chief Mechanical Engineer, and later Commissioner, for the Commonwealth Railways, which operates mostly in remote and desolate areas railways for the federal government.

== Biography ==
Smith graduated with honours from University of Sydney and was a locomotive designing and test engineer with the New South Wales Government Railways. During World War II, he worked at Chullora Railway Workshops supervising the production of war materials including the cruiser tank, bren gun carrier, Bristol Beaufort and Bristol Beaufighter aircraft projects. He was closely associated with the design of the 38 class locomotive.

In 1948, Smith joined the Tasmanian Government Railways as Production Engineer. In 1950, he joined the Commonwealth Railways, Port Augusta, as Chief Mechanical Engineer. As well as his Mechanical Branch responsibilities, in the role of Acting Chief Civil Engineer, he also supervised the construction of the standard gauge line from Stirling North to the Leigh Creek Coalfield. This project also involved the creation of the pick-a-back scheme whereby two complete narrow gauge coal consists were transported on a standard gauge rake of flat cars.

Under his stewardship, 1,000 km of new railway to Alice Springs were built, completed in 1980 and 1,420 km of further extension to Darwin were surveyed.

He introduced concrete sleepers and long welded rail to the Commonwealth Railways. He also had much of the North Australia Railway narrow gauge system rebuilt in the 1960s for the iron ore traffic. This work included the complete replacement of all the workshop facilities, much of the housing and office facilities while adding new locomotives and rollingstock. He had the Trans-Australian Railway rebuilt to modern standards and a new standard gauge line constructed between Port Augusta and Whyalla in 1972.

Smith also managed the transition from steam to diesel traction in the 1950s and also the accompanying modern air-conditioned rolling stock. This was followed by the introduction of a modern fleet of large capacity freight rollingstock. Triple deck sheep carriers could accommodate 600 sheep. Other large types of rollingstock were 21 000 gallon tank cars and 75-foot boxcars.

Smith was a key executive in the creation of the standard gauge line from the east coast of Australia to the west coast. He supervised the standardisation of the Port Pirie to Broken Hill lline.

He supervised the transition of the Commonwealth Railways to Australian National that incorporated the former South Australian and Tasmanian Government Railways. Smith was the longest serving Commissioner of the CR, before becoming the first Chairman of Commissioners of the Australian National, retiring in that position in 1981.

He was made an Officer of the Order of the British Empire in 1970. He died at Victor Harbor, South Australia, on 16 July 2011, aged 96.

== Pick-a-Back by the Trainload ==
One of Smith's more notable achievements was the expeditious introduction of a standard gauge pick-a-back consist to bypass a section of narrow gauge railway (Central Australia Railway) that was regularly washed away by floods. This pick-a-back consist transported a complete narrow gauge coal train by means of a narrow gauge track laid on the top of a rake of standard gauge flat cars.

By comparison, the Rollbock system of transporter train required that the wagons be loaded one at a time. It is not known what speed the pick-a-back train could achieve, possibly 80km/h maximum, but it is noted that the standard gauge line was brand new with gentle curves and gradients. The term piggy-back referred to road freight vehicles loaded on rail flat cars.

When no longer required, the pick-a-back equipment could be restored to normal service.

== Bibliography ==
- Tales from a Railway Odyssey - Volume 1 ISBN 1-86477-024-4 (Hard Cover)
- Tales from a Railway Odyssey - Volume 1 ISBN 1-86477-026-0 (Soft Cover)
- Tales from a Railway Odyssey
