= Mockava =

- Village
- Location of Mockava
- Coordinates: 54°18′30″N 23°18′20″E
- Country: Lithuania
- Ethnographic region: Suvalkija
- County: Marijampolė County
- Municipality: Kalvarija Municipality
- Eldership: Sangrūda Eldership

Population (2011)
  - Total: 59
- Time zone: UTC+2 (EET)
  - Summer (DST): UTC+3 (EEST)

Mockava is a village in Lithuania six kilometers from the border with Poland. The Mockava Railway Station is located northeast of Mockava in the village of Zelionka.

According to the 2011 census, the population of Mockava was 59.

== Transport ==
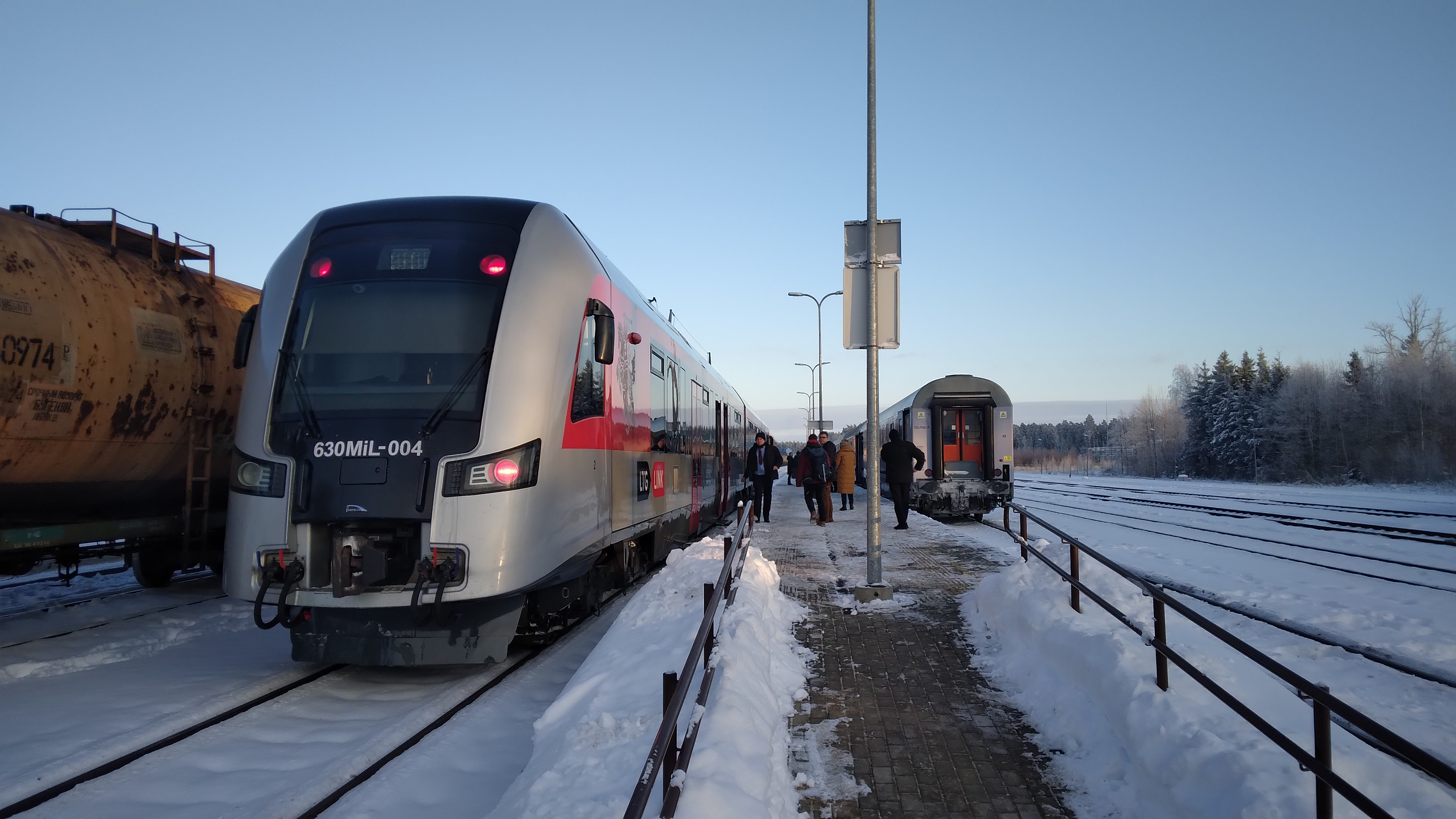
Mockava railway station.

The Rail Baltica project runs through the area. A break-of-gauge facility at Mockava allows rolling stock to be exchanged, between the European standard gauge, 1435 mm (4 ft 8 1/2 in), and the 1520 mm (4 ft 11 27/32 in) gauge of former satellite states of the Soviet Union. To speed up through traffic, a track-gauge changing facility operates, which includes the SUW 2000 variable gauge axle system that allows fitted trains to pass through the break of gauge at walking pace.

=== Railway station ===
Mockava railway station is a railway station east of Mockava, in the village of Zelionka, in southwestern Lithuania. It is served by the Polish State Railways's Mockava-Suwałki railway line. This station is built at the end of a dual-gauge track between Mockava and Šeštokai, which supports both Lithuania's Russian gauge and Poland's standard gauge.

==== History ====
In 1997, a liquefied gas transfer terminal was introduced at the Mockava station, and in 1999, a bogie exchange machine was installed.

On 23 July 2007, a plaque was unveiled at the station marking the launch of the EU-supported Rail Baltica project. Finally, on 11 December 2022, for the first time, the international Kraków-Vilnius InterCity train stopped at Mockava station.

Preceding station	LTG Link	Following station
through to Poland via transfer to PKP Intercity train	Vilnius—Warsaw—Kraków	Marijampolė towards Vilnius
Preceding station	PKP Intercity	Following station
Trakiszki towards Kraków Główny	IC	Terminus
