= SeaRail =

Finnish company

SeaRail Oy

- Founded: 1 January 1964
- Headquarters: Tampere, Finland
- Area served: Finland
- Services: Warehousing
- Owners: Mutares
- Website: www.searail.net

SeaRail is a company based in Tampere, Finland operating a logistics terminal.

The company operated a train ferry for railway freight wagons between Turku, Finland, and Stockholm, Sweden. Because the 1,524 mm (5 ft) track gauge of the Finnish railways (VR) is 89 mm (3.5 in) wider than the standard gauge of much of the rest of Europe (including Sweden), a special fleet of freight wagons with interchangeable bogies was used. The break-of-gauge point was several hundred meters inside Finland at Turku and the bogies were exchanged in a specially-equipped depot; this procedure could be achieved in 10 minutes and involved jacking up each wagon. The Tallink train ferry Sea Wind conveyed the SeaRail wagons between Finland and Sweden. These operated twice-daily from Turku and Stockholm. Rail car traffic onboard ferries from Turku to Stockholm were closed down on 30 April 2012.

VR bought Green Cargo's half of the company in 2019. In 2023, SeaRail was included in VR's sale of its road freight transport division to German investment firm Mutares.

== See also ==
- Bogie exchange
- Variable gauge axles
- Wheelset
