= Toledo and South Haven Railroad =

Narrow-gauge railroad in Michigan

Overview
- Dates of operation: 1876–1894
- Successor: South Haven and Eastern Railway

Technical
- Track gauge: 3 ft (914 mm)
- Length: 37 miles (60 km)

The Toledo and South Haven Railroad was a 3 ft (914 mm) narrow gauge railroad that connected the Michigan communities of Lawrence, Hartford and South Haven. It filed for incorporation April 1, 1876 and was bought by Fred M. Steele and renamed the South Haven and Eastern in 1894. The railroad had considerable financial and legal difficulties from the start.

== Acquisition of Paw Paw Railroad ==
In 1878 the Paw Paw Railroad leased its track to the T&SH in hopes of recovering from a $3000 debt and a 60% drop in stock value. The company had graded a route between Paw Paw and Lawton with financial help from the Michigan Central in 1867.

With 9 miles (14 km) of track between Lawrence and Paw Paw, the T&SH looked to expand. A section of track between Lawrence and Hartford was completed in 1883. In 1884 the two companies signed an agreement that funds obtained through the sale of stocks and bonds would be used to complete 10 miles (16 km) of rail east of Lawton or west of Hartford. Two years later an incomplete extension from Hartford to South Haven was purchased.

== Legal Trouble ==
Chas. F. Young filed suit in 1887 in order to stop the sale of the PPR on the grounds that the sale of an incomplete railroad was illegal. Young initially won, but during the proceedings of the 1889 appeal, the T&SH defense made it known that they had bought the PPR with an assurance from Young that his company was actively building a link between Paw Paw and Lawton. Furthermore, all PPR assets had been leased, excluding the actual grade.

== Financial Trouble and Sale ==
Even after completing a link to Lawton, the T&SH was unable to stay fiscally solvent. The cost of litigation may have played a role, as well as the unanticipated expense of building the Paw Paw to Lawton track. In 1893 the company was ordered to pay $306,397 in foreclosure to Farmers Loan and Trust Company. The company was bought a year later by Chicago businessman Fred Steele, who renamed it the South Haven and Eastern. By 1898 the SH&E track had been converted to 4 ft 8 1/2 in (1,435 mm) standard gauge. This company would later play a large role in the forming of the Kalamazoo, Lake Shore and Chicago Railway.
