= SUW 2000 =

SUW 2000 is a Polish variable gauge system that allows trains to cross a break of gauge. It is interoperable with the German Rafil Type V system (built by the Radsatzfabrik Ilsenburg).

== History ==
The SUW 2000 system was designed by Ryszard Suwalski. Suwalski, of PKP Cargo, developed the system between 1990 and 1992. Prototype wheelsets, bogies for passenger carriages and goods wagons, and gauge changer were produced in 1993. The wheelsets were manufactured by ZNTK Poznań.

In October 2000 first regular passenger and freight trains started running between Poland and Lithuania.

In June 2003 regular passenger trains started running between Poland and Ukraine.

In 2008 SUW 2000 II, a development of the original SUW 2000, was presented. It introduced new bogie, improved gauge changer that is expected to last 20% longer, and electronic system checking and registering regauging and wheelset locking.

In 2019, as the result of the bankruptcy and subsequent liquidation of ZNTK Poznań, PKP acquired documentation and rights to the SUW 2000 patents and technology. The system, renamed Polsuw, will be further developed in cooperation with Poznań University of Technology, one of the areas of work being the reduction of operating costs.

== Operation ==
The SUW 2000 wheelsets feature unlockable wheels that, after unlocking, can move along the axles. The gauge changer is 27.1 m (88 ft 11 in) long and is equipped with grooved rails and guide rails to guide wheels and maintain vehicle stability while its wheels are unlocked, and wheel unlocking rails. The wheels on each side are moved sequentially—only after a wheel on one side has been moved to new gauge and locked, the opposite wheel is unlocked and begins moving. The speed range of a consist going through the gauge changer can be between 5 and 30 km/h (3.1 and 18.6 mph). Originally the system did not have any control equipment to check if the regauging process went right, it relied on the personnel conducting visual checks on each wheelset. In 2003 an electronic system to monitor the regauging process and signal any malfunction was developed.

During initial regular operation, after 400 thousand km (250 thousand mi), excessive wear to monoblock wheels was noticed, it was attributed to brake malfunctions; there was also some tearing of rubber sheaths due to friction between them and water draining pipes. Other than that, the system performed satisfactorily; it was observed that the system worked correctly even at temperatures as low as −35 °C (−31 °F).

The introduction of SUW 2000 gauge changing facility at the Polish-Ukrainian border reduced the total travel time by 2 hours.

For a 32-wagon goods train it takes about 12 hours to cross the break of gauge using the bogie exchange facility. A transshipment involving unloading goods from one train and loading them onto another takes about 22 hours. If SUW 2000 II was deployed, the time taken for the crossing would be reduced to 4 hours.

== Manufacture ==
The following SUW 2000 wheelsets and bogies were offered:

Wheelset type	Bogie type	Max axle load	Max speed	Brakes	Rail gauges
P-053BK	4RS/N	20 t (20 long tons; 22 short tons)	120 km/h (75 mph)	2 discs per axle, 610 mm (2.00 ft) dia.	1,435 mm (4 ft 8 1/2 in) standard gauge / 1,520 mm (4 ft 11 27/32 in) Russian gauge
P-064BK	4RSa/N	22.5 t (22.1 long tons; 24.8 short tons)	100 km/h (62 mph)	2 discs per axle, 610 mm (2.00 ft) dia.	1,435 mm (4 ft 8 1/2 in) standard gauge / 1,520 mm (4 ft 11 27/32 in) Russian gauge
P-057BK	25AN/S	16 t (16 long tons; 18 short tons)	160 km/h (99 mph)	2 discs per axle, 610 mm (2.00 ft) dia.	1,435 mm (4 ft 8 1/2 in) standard gauge / 1,520 mm (4 ft 11 27/32 in) Russian gauge

Between 1999 and 2009 ZNTK Poznań manufactured altogether 16 wheelsets for freight wagons and 68 wheelsets for passenger carriages. These were supplied to PKP Cargo (for 4 goods wagons), and PKP Intercity and UZ (for 10 and 5 passenger carriages, respectively, the remaining 8 being spares). They were used on passenger trains Balti (Warsaw – Vilnius, running October 1999–May 2005) and Chełmoński (Kraków – Kiyv, running from December 2003 until 2006, from 2009 until November 2016 to Lviv) and on a goods train between Mielec / Szczecinek (Poland) and Kazlų Rūda (Lithuania), running until 2009).

As of February 2007, a single SUW 2000 bogie cost the equivalent of $42,000.

== Deployment ==
SUW 2000 gauge changing facilities are installed at the following locations:

1,435 mm (4 ft 8 1/2 in) – 1,520 mm (4 ft 11 27/32 in)

- (Poland) Mockava, Lithuania (dismantled in August 2013 during the rebuilding of the station, restored in or around 2016)
- (Ukraine) Dorohusk, Poland
- (Poland) Mostyska, Ukraine

A gauge changing facility was also planned at Brest, Belarus

- (Poland) ZNTK Piła (research and testing)
- (Poland) ZNTK Poznań (research and testing)
- (Poland) Zamość Bortatycze LHS (research and testing, can also be used as a link between the Broad Gauge Metallurgy Line and the standard-gauge PKP PLK network)

The construction of a standard-gauge railway line from the border to Kaunas railway station and intermodal freight terminal (part of Rail Baltica) made it possible to cross the Polish-Lithuanian border using standard-gauge rolling stock.

== Incidents ==
At the end of 2006, on a train from Kraków to Kyiv, after going through the gauge changing facility, one of the wheel locks failed to engage. After about 200 km (120 mi) running with an unlocked wheel, the carriage derailed. The Ukrainian authorities subsequently withdrew the certificate for SUW 2000-equipped rolling stock. After the introduction of additional safety system and a round of intergovernmental negotiations, SUW 2000-equipped rolling stock was again permitted to use Ukrainian railway network.

== See also ==
- Trans-Asian Railway
