= Rollbock =

Railway trucks that can carry a standard gauge wagon on a narrow-gauge line

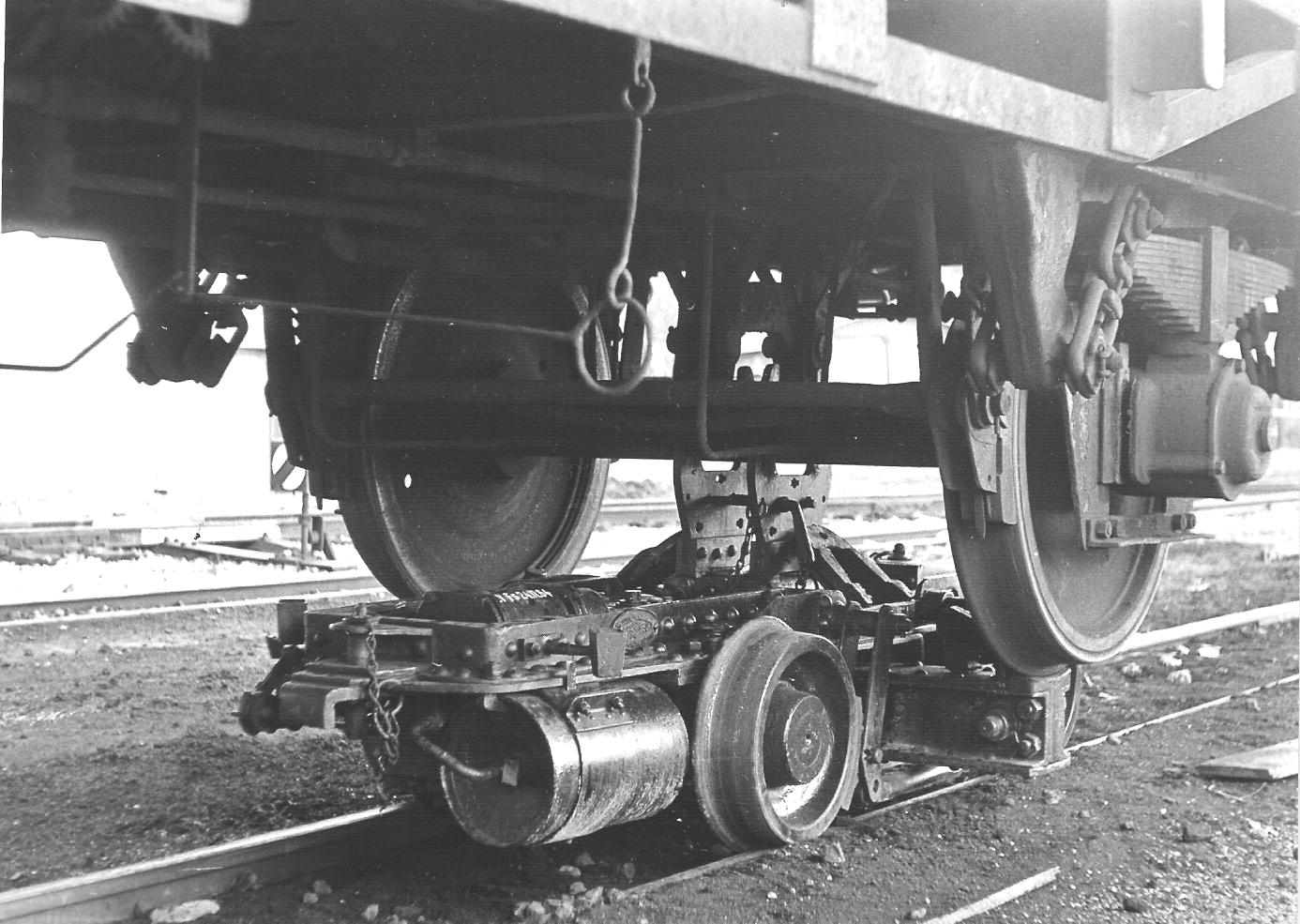
Standard gauge goods wagon (freight car) on Rollbock, 750 mm (2 ft 5 1/2 in) gauge

Rollbocks, sometimes called transporter trailers, are narrow gauge railway trucks or bogies that allow a standard gauge wagon to 'piggyback' on a narrow-gauge line. The Vevey system enables a coupled train of standard gauge wagons to be automatically loaded or rolled onto Rollbocks, so that the train can then continue through a change of gauge.

The system uses a pair of narrow gauge (750 or 1,000 mm) rails laid in a pit that is built in the middle of a standard gauge track, which is elevated by about 30 cm. It allows the Rollbock bogies to sit underneath the standard gauge tracks and as the Rollbock train is pulled out of the Rollbock siding each bogie picks up one axle of a standard gauge wagon as it rises out of the Rollbock pit. Thus two Rollböcke are needed for a twin-axle wagon. They were a development of the transporter wagon (Rollwagen), designed to keep cost and weight down by avoiding the need for a complete wagon.

== History ==
The original invention goes back to the Rollwagen of the Schweizer Maschinenfabrik Winterthur (Swiss Locomotive and Machine Works, Winterthur) or SLM patented in 1880. It is a simple system for light loads that found applications even when the superior Langbein system was invented in 1881 by the Maschinenfabrik Esslingen (Esslingen Engineering Works) named after Paul Langbein being the director of the facilities in Saronno, Italy.

A similar design appeared on the Paw Paw Railroad in Michigan in the late 1870's as an improvement from the Ramsey car-transfer apparatus, and it's inventor C.F. Allen also obtained a patent on his transfer truck in 1880, although the truck would ultimately see limited use in the United States compared to its European counterparts.

The Langbein system uses pairs of claws which are folded up laterally by hand, to form a yoke around the axles of the standard gauge bogies. When the bogies are pulled out of the pit the standard gauge wheels can sink onto the Rollbock to find support. This method enables the Rollbock wagons to traverse curves as sharp as 15 m (49.2 ft) radius and, when fully loaded, they could be moved over narrow gauge tracks at a safe speed of 13 mph or 21 km/h.

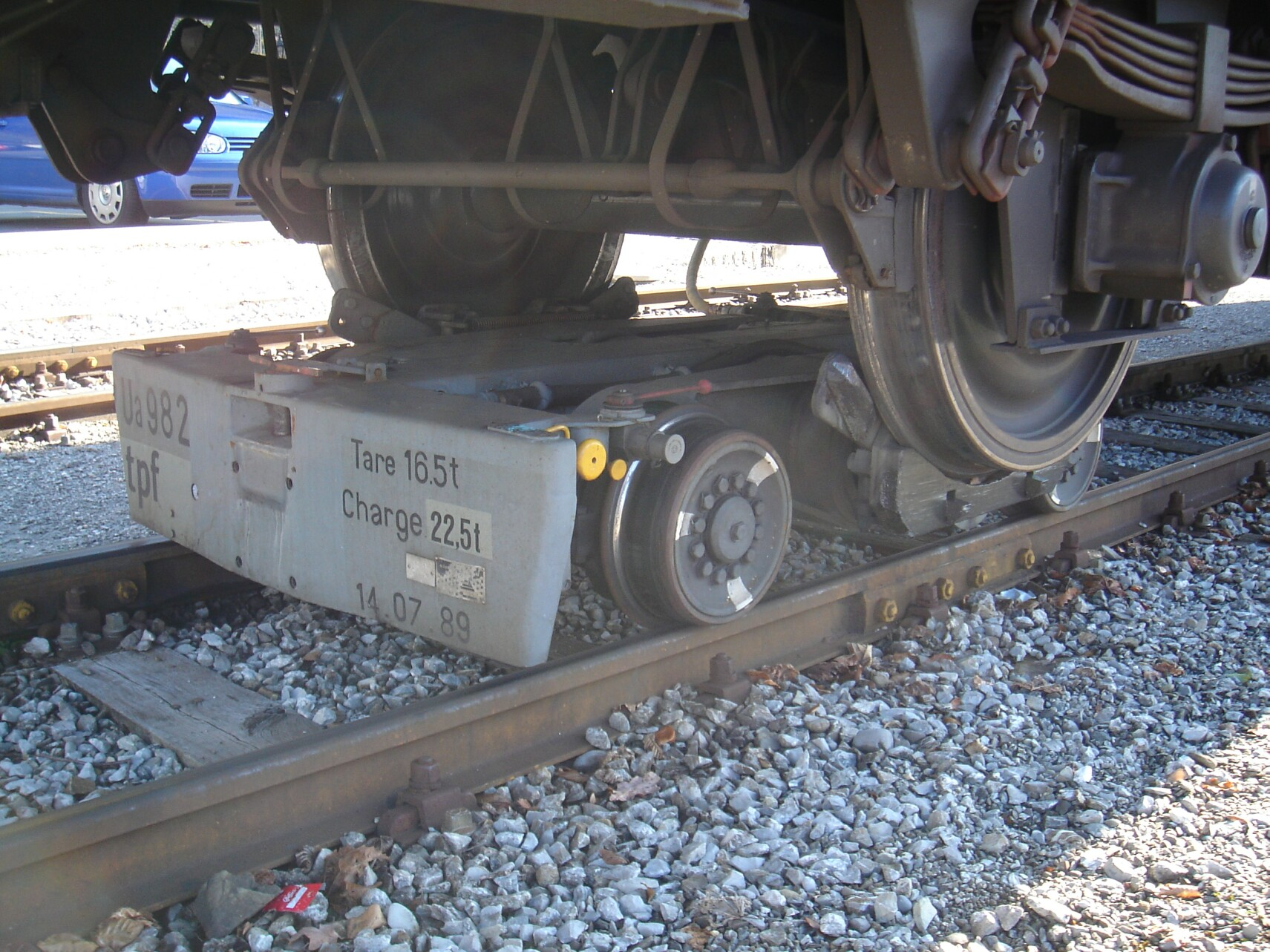
Vevey system Rollbock in Broc-fabrique, Switzerland

In 1974 a refinement of the concept was developed for the Yverdon–Ste-Croix railway in Switzerland. Unlike the Langbein system, the Vevey system requires no manual intervention to fix the standard gauge axles over the narrow gauge bogies. In this system, rather than the axle being supported, the wheel flanges of the wagons are cradled in brackets projecting from the side of the Rollbock. This lowers the centre of gravity and increases stability. Many modern Rollbock users have converted to the Vevey System. They are used with a speed of up to 40 km/h, either loaded or empty. The Vevey Technologies company was bought by Bombardier in 1998.

== Use ==
They are used extensively in Switzerland and in Spain, in the latter country to transport standard gauge vehicles on broad gauge lines.

They are also in use on the Harz Narrow Gauge Railways to transport limestone from the Unterberg quarry to Nordhausen, where they are transferred to the DB system at a pit between the station and Hesseröderstraße. Trains are diesel-hauled and typically consist of 12 22 m^{3} (780 cu ft) Fccpps ballast hopper wagons from Voestalpine Railpro; the Rollböcke are painted bright pink.

Until the 1990s the Rollbock sidings at Wernigerode were used every day to transport goods to and from the various metallurgical factories attached to the Harz Narrow Gauge Railways in the immediate area. Similarly it was used extensively on the Saxon narrow gauge system west of Dresden to transport china clay to Meissen.

Using rollbock technology requires that the narrower gauge network must be built to a structure gauge large enough to accommodate the loading gauge of standard gauge wagons, and that negates one of the cost advantages of narrower gauge construction. The system was tested for the narrow gauge railways in Saxony around 1900 but it found only rare application – tracks requiring higher transport capacity were rebuilt to 1,435 mm (4 ft 8 1/2 in) standard gauge instead. However it is also possible to use the wagons of the narrow gauge loading gauge type built with standard gauge axles which allows them to run at full speed on standard gauge tracks, piggybacking them on the short section in the mountains by Rollbock bogies. This application requires that the receiver of the freight is able to unload those wagons, so they have found only limited use.

== Gallery ==
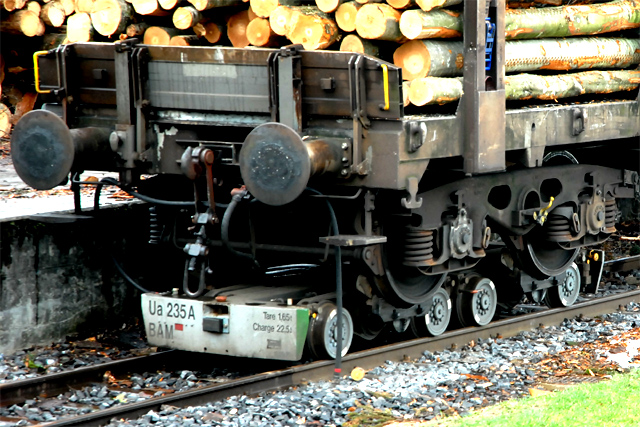
Timber wagon on rollbocks

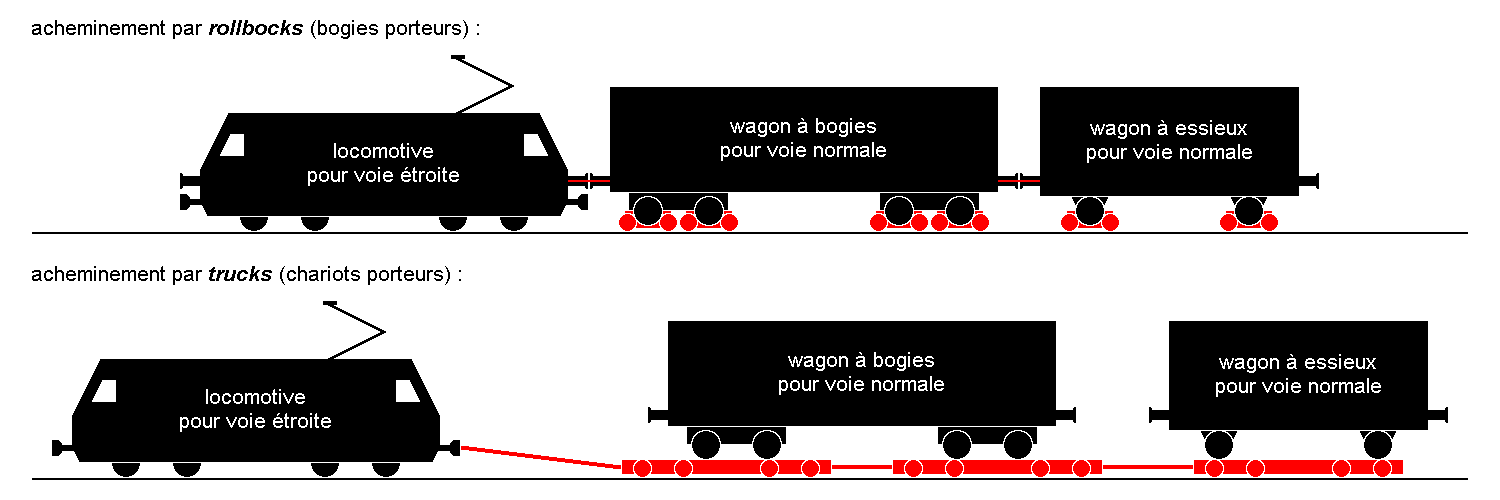
Rollbocks compared to transporter wagons

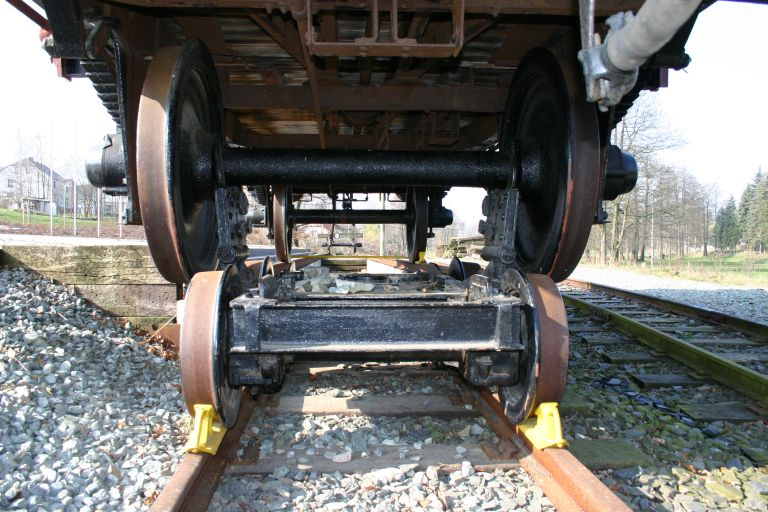
Goods van on a Rollbock

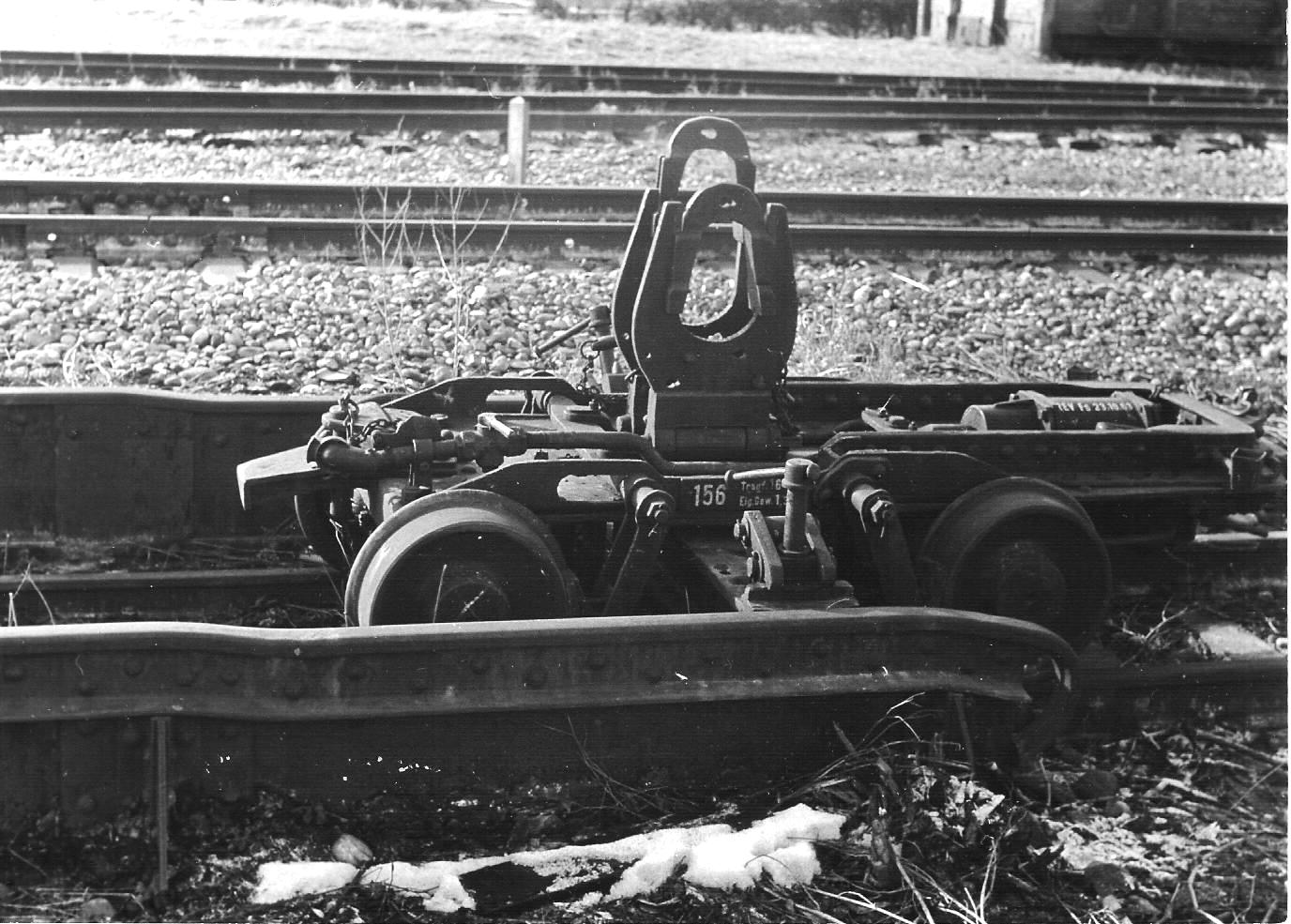
Rollbock track 750 mm (2 ft 5 1/2 in) gauge

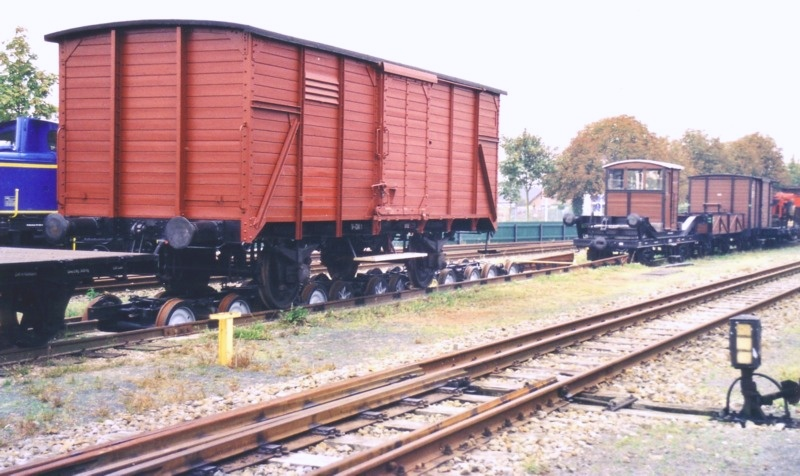
Goods van raised above the pit

== See also ==
- Break of gauge
- Dual gauge
- Bogie exchange
- Transporter wagon
- Narrow gauge railways in Saxony

== Bibliography ==
- Jackson, Alan A. (2006). The Railway Dictionary, 4th ed., Sutton Publishing, Stroud. ISBN 0-7509-4218-5.
