= Variable gauge =

System used by trains to cross a break of gauge

Variable gauge systems allow railway vehicles to travel between two railways with different track gauges. Vehicles are equipped with variable gauge axles (VGA). The gauge is altered by driving the train through a gauge changer installed at the break of gauge which moves the wheels to the gauge desired.

Variable gauge systems exist within the internal network of Spain, and are installed on international links between Spain/France (Spanish train), Sweden/Finland (Swedish train), Poland/Lithuania (Polish train) and Poland/Ukraine (Polish train).

A system for changing gauge without the need to stop is in widespread use for passenger traffic in Spain, for services run on a mix of dedicated high-speed lines (using Standard gauge) and older lines (using Iberian gauge). Similar systems for freight traffic are still in their infancy, as the higher axle weight increases the technological challenge. Although several alternatives exist, including transferring freight, replacing individual wheels and axles, bogie exchange, transporter flatcars or the simple transshipment of freight or passengers, they are impractical, thus a cheap and fast system for changing gauge would be beneficial for cross-border freight traffic.

Alternative names include Gauge Adjustable Wheelsets (GAW), Automatic Track Gauge Changeover Systems (ATGCS/AGCS), Rolling Stock Re-Gauging System (RSRS), Rail Gauge Adjustment System (RGAS), Shifting wheelset, Variable Gauge Rolling Truck, track gauge change and track change wheelset.

== Overview ==
Variable gauge axles help solve the problem of a break-of-gauge without having to resort to dual gauge tracks or transshipment. Systems allow the adjustment between two gauges. No gauge changer designs supporting more than two gauges are used.

=== Systems ===
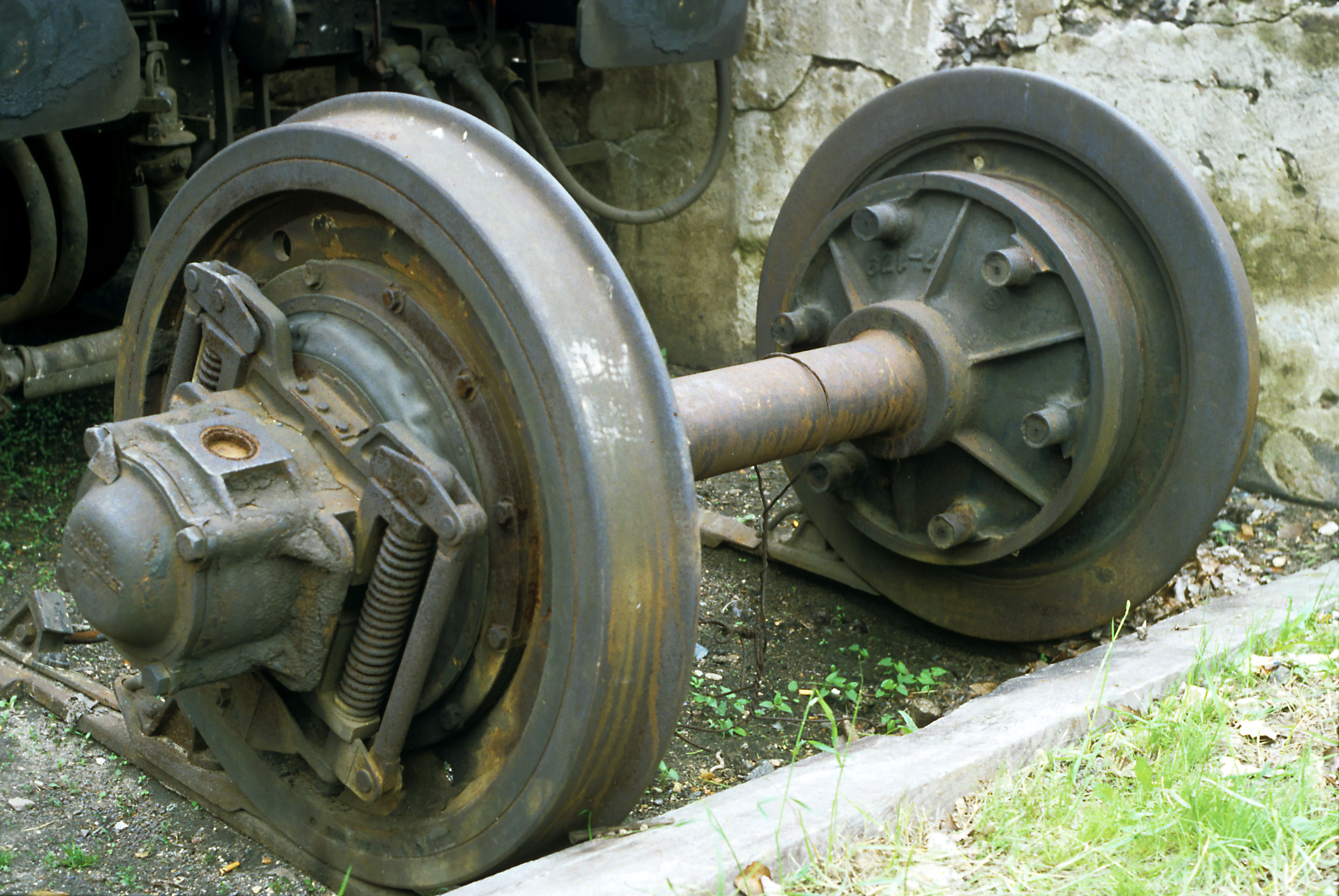
Variable gauge axle DR III for 1,435 mm (4 ft 8 1/2 in) and 1,524 mm (5 ft) gauge, developed in 1957

There are several variable gauge axle systems:

- Talgo-RD (from Talgo).
  - The Talgo system has been in revenue service in Portbou and Irun, on the Spanish-French border, since 1969
  - It is used on the Strizh train (swift) between Moscow and Berlin.
  - From 2014 for freight wagons up to 22.5 tonne axleloads
- CAF-BRAVA (from Construcciones y Auxiliar de Ferrocarriles)
  - The BRAVA system was originally designed in 1968 by the Vevey Company in Switzerland. The system was originally called the "Vevey axle". The design was subsequently obtained and improved by Construcciones y Auxiliar de Ferrocarriles (CAF).
- DB Cargo–Knorr-Bremse. being developed in 2002 for use between Europe and Russia.
- DBAG–Rafil Type V for freight (from Radsatzfabrik Ilsenburg for Deutsche Bahn).
- Japan Railways RTRI (from the Japan Railway Technical Research Institute) to be used on motorised axles.
- PKP SUW 2000 system produced by ZNTK Poznań for Polish State Railways.
- Montreux–Lenk im Simmental line, also developed by Prose of Winterthur in 2022 (1,435 mm (4 ft 8 1/2 in)/1,000 mm (3 ft 3 3/8 in)). Strictly speaking, this is not a variable gauge axle system; the bogie wheels are individually suspended without a connecting axle, and their gauge can be adjusted. Furthermore, while the gauge is being changed, the height of the body is changed by 200 mm (7.9 in) to match the difference in the platform heights on the two different gauge railways comprising the GoldenPass Express.

==== Compatibility ====
The variable gauge systems are not themselves all compatible. The SUW 2000 and Rafil Type V systems are interoperable, as are TALGO-RD and CAF-BRAVA.

In 2009, at Roda de Barà near Tarragona, a Unichanger capable of handling four different VGA systems was under development.

==== International traffic ====
VGA is particularly important with international railway traffic because gauge changes tend to occur more often at international borders.

==== Features ====
Different systems have different limitations, for example, some can be used on carriages and wagons only and are unsuitable for motive power, while others require that rolling stock is unloaded before going through the gauge changer. When one of the gauges is narrow there may not be enough space between the wheels for the Brakes, Gauge Changer and the Traction Motors.

Country	Spain		Poland	Germany	Japan	Switzerland
System(s)	TALGO	CAF	SUW 2000	Rafil V	RTRI	Stadler + Prose
Railways for which suitable	Spain, EU	Spain, EU	EU, Ukraine	Germany, Russia	Japan	Switzerland, MOB
Passenger carriages	✓	✓	✓	✗	✓	✓
Goods wagons	✓	✗	✓	✓	✗	✗
Motive power (driven axles)	✓	✓	✗	✗	✓	✗
Under load (change with load on wheels)	✗	✗	✓	✓	✗	✗
Standard Gauge/Broader Gauge	✓	✓	✓	✓	✗	✗
Standard Gauge/Narrower Gauge	✗	✗	✗	✗	✓	✓

===== Maximum speed =====
The maximum speed of the trains equipped with the different technologies varies. Only CAF and Talgo produce high-speed VGA, allowing speeds up to 330 km/h (210 mph).

===== Speed changing =====
The Talgo RD GC changes gauge at a speed of 15 kilometres per hour (9.3 mph; 4.2 m/s) so a 100 m (328 ft) train takes only 24 seconds to convert.

== Gauge changer ==
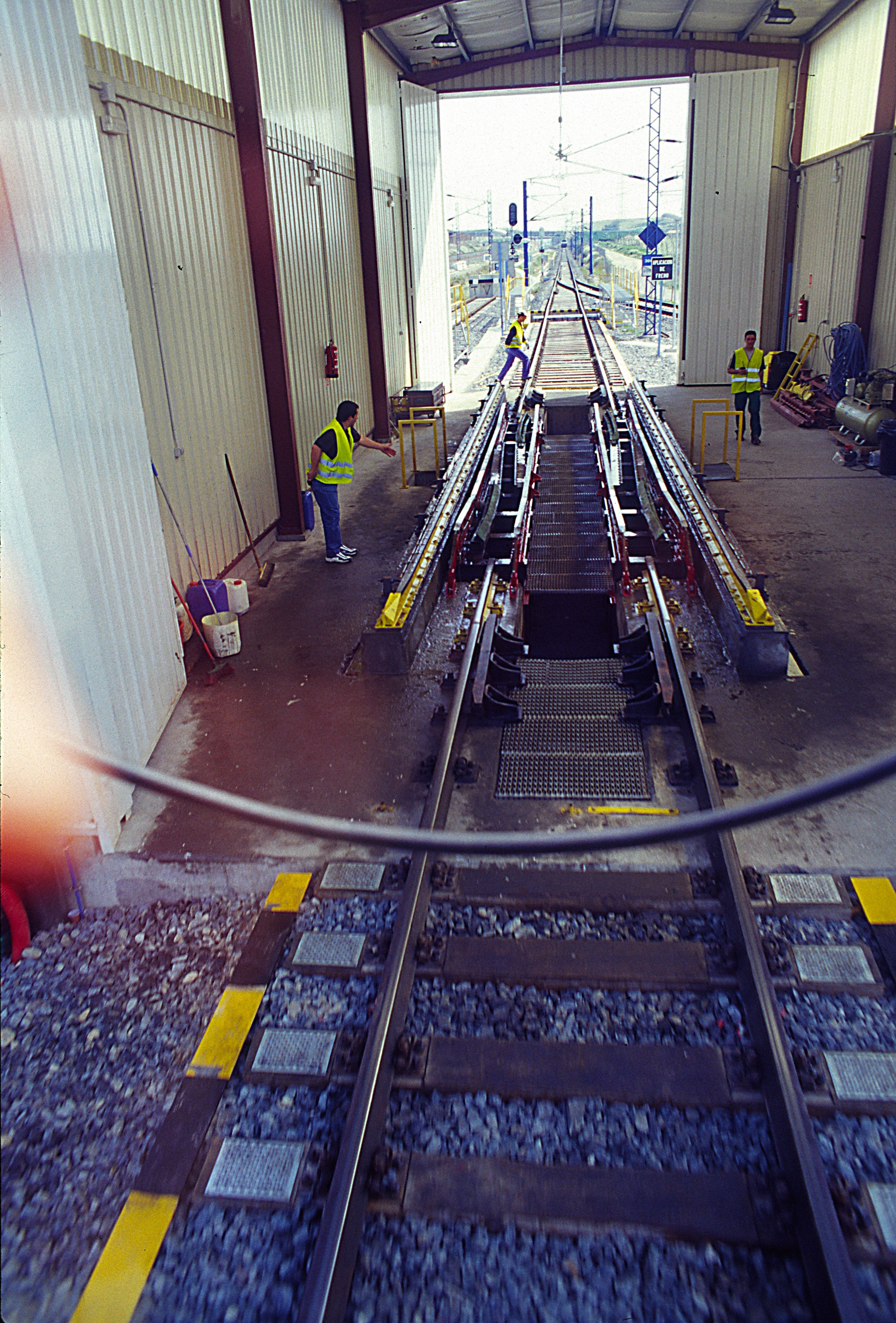
A Talgo gauge changing system in Lleida, Spain

A gauge changer is the device that adjusts the spacing between a railway vehicle's wheels to allow it to operate on tracks with different gauges. A typical gauge changer consists of guide rails that support the weight of the train while mechanical components unlock the wheels, guide them to their new positions, and lock them in place.

Using the Talgo-RD system as an example, the gauge-changing process consists of the following steps:

1. Verify that all vehicles in the train are equipped for gauge changing.
2. Support the vehicles on guide rails, removing the weight from the wheels and enabling movement of the wheel locks.
3. Unlock the wheels.
4. Move the wheels to the new gauge position.
5. Relock the wheels.
6. Transfer the weight from the guide rails back to the wheels.
7. Verify that the wheelsets have been correctly locked and record the operating data.

The process can use ECPB power and supervisory or Digital automatic coupling (DAC) cables for communication and control.

In the Talgo-RD system, a constant spray of water is used to lubricate the metal surfaces, especially the guide rails, to reduce heat and wear. A Talgo-RD gauge changer is 20 metres (65 ft 7 in) long and 6 metres (19 ft 8 in) wide.

=== Limitations ===
At present the choice of gauge is limited to two out of three of 1,435 mm (4 ft 8 1/2 in) and broad gauges 1,520 mm (4 ft 11 27/32 in) and 1,676 mm (5 ft 6 in). With narrow gauges such as 1,000 mm (3 ft 3 3/8 in) as found at Zweisimmen, Switzerland, there is less room between the wheels for the gauge change mechanism, the traction motors, and the brakes. The diameter of the wheels also limits the axleload to no more than 22.5 tonnes.

=== Operation ===
A variable gauge multiple unit, or a train including a variable gauge locomotive (e.g. Talgo 250) and rolling stock, may drive straight across a gauge changer. Normally the locomotive will not be able to change gauge, meaning that it must move out of the way whilst the remainder of the train itself passes through. On the opposite side, a new locomotive of the other gauge will couple to the train.

A Talgo train with a locomotive can drive across a gauge change at 1 axle per second at a speed of about 10–15 km/h (6.2–9.3 mph).

A train (or an individual car) can be pushed halfway across the gauge-changer, uncoupled, and then (once far enough across) coupled to the new locomotive and pulled the rest of the way. A long length of wire-rope with hooks on the end means that the process can be asynchronous, with the rope used to bridge across the length of the gauge changer (to temporarily couple the arriving cars and receiving locomotive, although without braking control from the locomotive to the train vehicles).

On long-distance trains in Spain and night trains crossing from Spain into France, the arriving locomotive stops just short of the gauge changer, uncouples and moves into a short siding out of the way. Gravity then moves the train through the gauge changer at a controlled low speed. The new locomotive is coupled onto the front only after the full train has finished passing through the changer.

From 2014 gauge changing systems for freight wagons were being developed.

== Countries ==
=== Australia ===
In 1933, as many as 140 inventions were reviewed by Australian federal and state railway commissions to overcome the breaks of gauge between the different states. None were accepted. About 20 of these devices were adjustable wheels/axles of some kind or another, which may be analogous to the modern VGA. VGA systems were mostly intended for Broad Gauge and Standard Gauge lines.

Break of Gauge stations were installed at Port Pirie, Peterborough and Albury; these were fairly manual in operation. The newest installation was at Dry Creek and was of a more automatic design. The Talgo RD design is even more automatic and efficient.

=== Belarus/Poland ===
A Talgo gauge changing facility is installed at Brest near the Belarusian-Polish border. It is used by Russian Railways' fast trains connecting Moscow and Berlin.

Orders for 7 Talgo VGA trainsets placed were placed in 2011. The trains under the brand "Strizh" are in service since 2016.

=== Canada ===
Variable gauge axles were used for a while on the Grand Trunk Railway in the 1860s in Canada to connect 5 ft 6 in (1,676 mm) and 4 ft 8 1/2 in (1,435 mm) standard gauge without transshipment. Five hundred vehicles were fitted with "adjustable gauge trucks" but following heavy day-in, day-out use the system proved unsatisfactory, particularly in cold and snowy weather. The system used telescoping axles with wide hubs that allowed the wheels to be squeezed or stretched apart through a gauge-changer, after holding pins had been manually released.

Railway operations over the Niagara Bridge were also complicated.

=== Finland/Sweden ===
In 1999, a gauge-changer was installed at Tornio at the Finnish end of the dual-gauge section between Haparanda and Tornio, for use with variable gauge freight wagons. The Tornio gauge changer is a Rafil design from Germany; a similar Talgo-RD gauge changer at the Haparanda end used to exist, but was removed as it required de-icing in winter.

Train ferry traffic operated by SeaRail and arriving from Germany and Sweden by sea used bogie exchange facilities in the Port of Turku.

=== Georgia ===
A new gauge changer has been put in place in Akhalkalaki for Baku-Tbilisi-Kars railway. Northwestern end has rails 1,435 mm (4 ft 8 1/2 in) apart, southeastern end has rails 1,520 mm (4 ft 11 27/32 in) apart. Both bogie exchange and variable gauge adapters are provided.

=== Japan ===
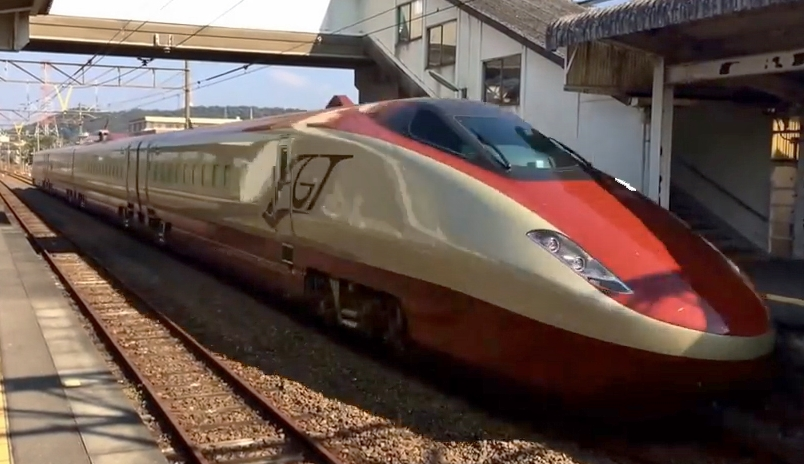
The Japanese third-generation GCT "Gauge Change Train" EMU on a test run in November 2014

The "Gauge Change Train" is a project started in Japan in the 1990s to investigate the feasibility of producing an electric multiple unit (EMU) train capable of operating both the 1,435 mm (4 ft 8 1/2 in) Shinkansen high-speed network at 270–300 km/h (168–186 mph) and the original 1,067 mm (3 ft 6 in) network at 130–140 km/h (81–87 mph). See U.S. patent 5,816,170.

The first-generation train was tested from 1998 to 2006, including on the US High-speed Test Track in 2002. The second-generation train, intended to run at a maximum speed of 270 km/h (168 mph), was test-run in various locations in Japan between 2006 and 2013. A third-generation train has been undergoing reliability trials since 2014 in preparation for potential introduction to service on the planned Kyushu Shinkansen extension to Nagasaki.

==== Gallery ====
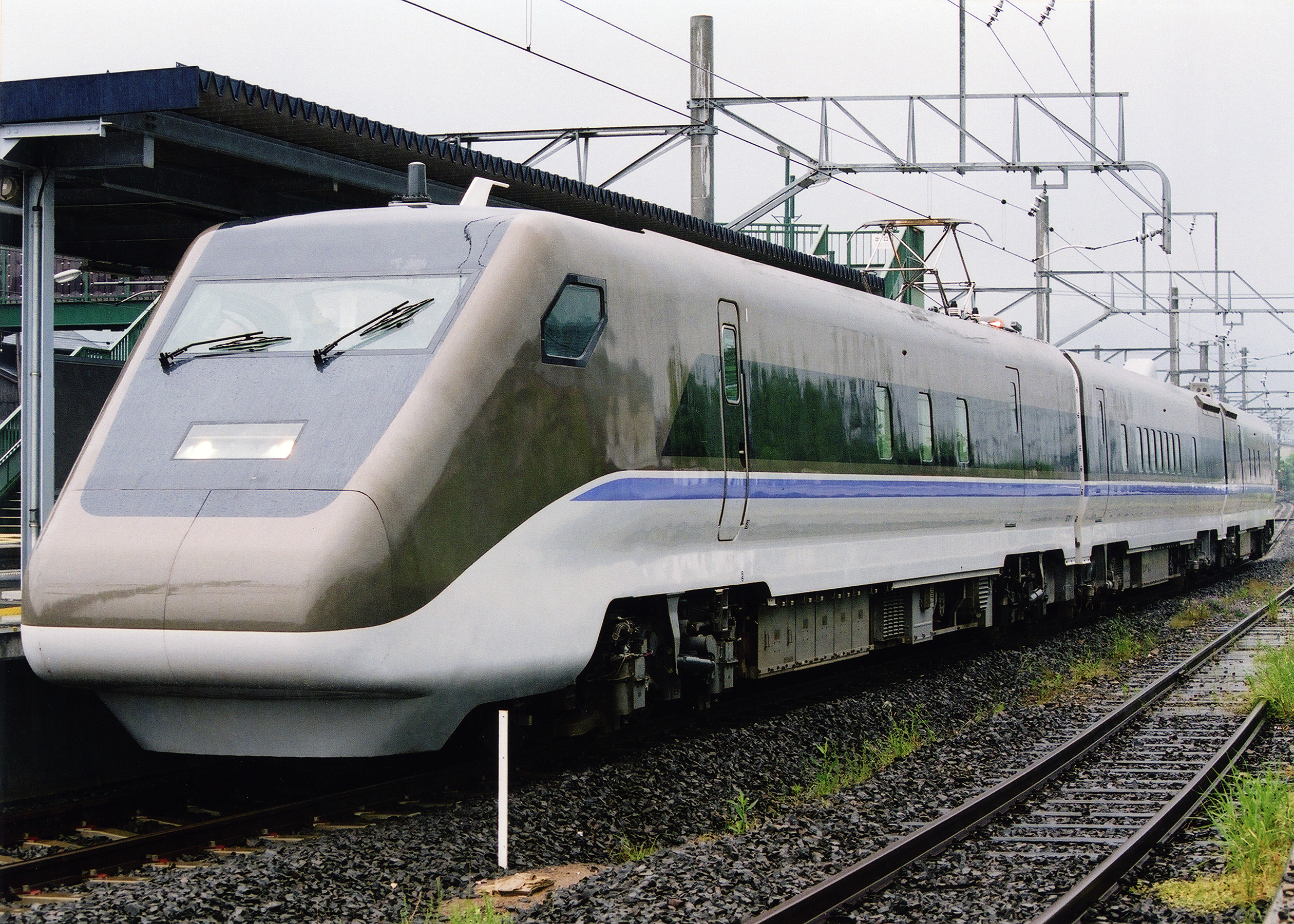
The first-generation "Gauge Change Train" EMU in May 2003

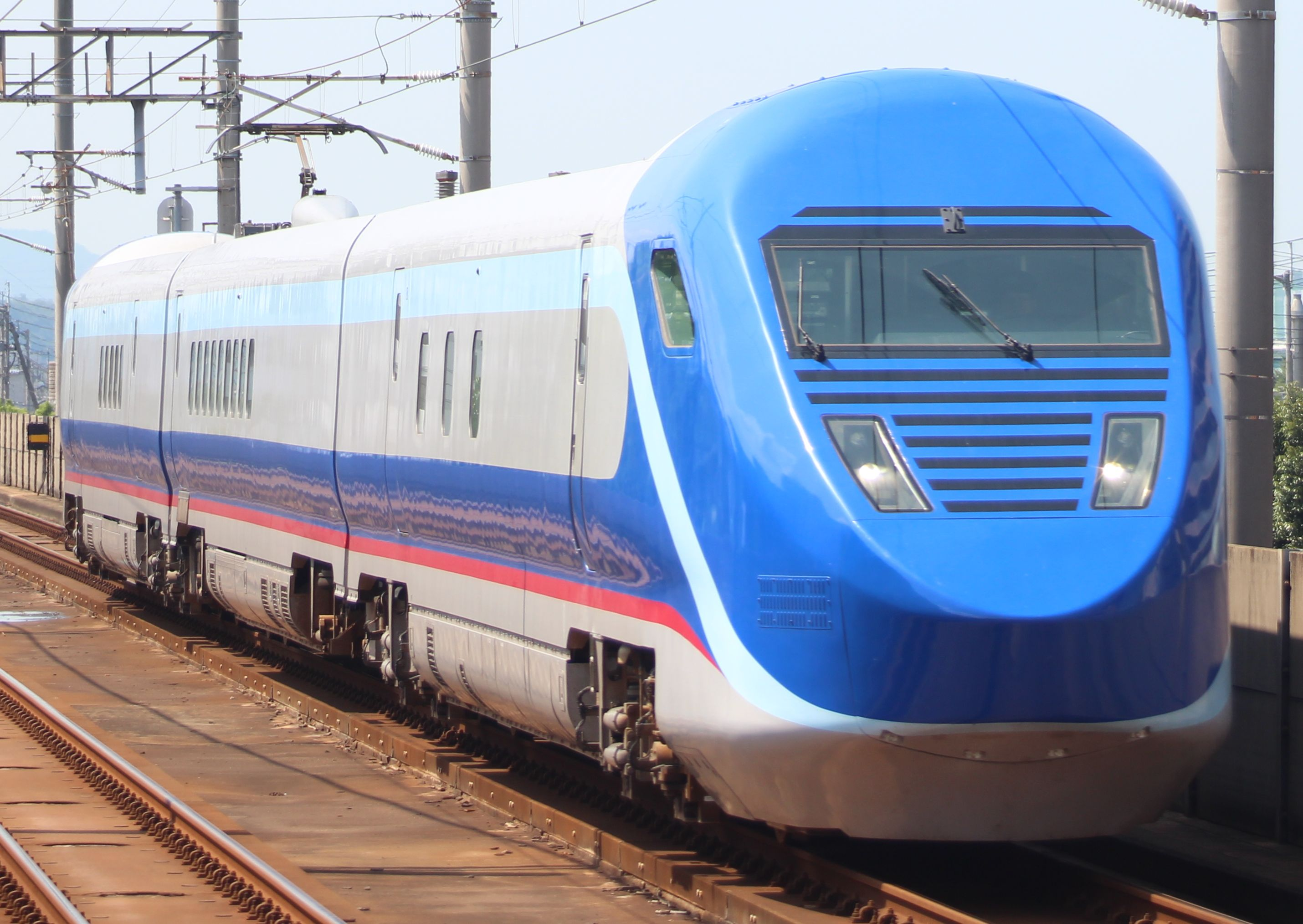
The second-generation "Gauge Change Train" EMU in September 2012

=== Lithuania/Poland ===
A gauge changing facility of the Polish SUW 2000 system is installed at Mockava north of the Lithuanian-Polish border. VGA passenger trains between Lithuania and Poland were running between October 1999 and May 2005, and VGA goods trains between early 2000s and 2009.

=== Poland/Ukraine ===
There are two gauge changing facilities of the Polish SUW 2000 system installed on the Polish-Ukrainian border, one of them in Dorohusk (Poland) on the Warsaw-Kiyv line, another in Mostyska (Ukraine) on the Kraków-Lviv line. On 14 December 2003 VGA passenger trains were introduced between Kraków (Poland) and Lviv (Ukraine) instead of bogie exchange. VGA saves about 3 hours compared to bogie exchange. The trains last ran in 2016.

=== Spain ===
Spain is the largest user of variable gauge systems. This is because of the need to connect older mainlines built to Iberian gauge and extensive new high-speed railway lines and connections to France, using the standard gauge. Two gauge changes are installed on lines to France and at all entrances/exits leading between the high-speed network and older lines. There are also significant lengths of 1,000 mm (3 ft 3 3/8 in) secondary lines but these are not connected to the main network.

In February 2004, RENFE placed orders for:

- Forty-five CAF/Alstom 25 kV AC/3 kV DC, variable gauge EMUs for 250 km/h regional services, between October 2006 and May 2009 (€580 million)
- Twenty-six 25 kV AC variable gauge trains for 250 km/h (155 mph) long-distance services using two Bombardier power cars and Talgo Series VII trailer cars (€370 million) Gauges involved are 1,435 mm (4 ft 8 1/2 in) and 1,668 mm (5 ft 5 21/32 in).
- Olmedo to Medina del Campo in Valladolid, Spanish test track.
- November 2008 – High Speed trainset for Cadiz to Warsaw.
- July 2009 – Talgo 250 supplied with Voith Turbo SZH-692 gauge change final drives.

There is also a 14.4 km (8.95 mi) circular test track in Spain.

=== Switzerland ===
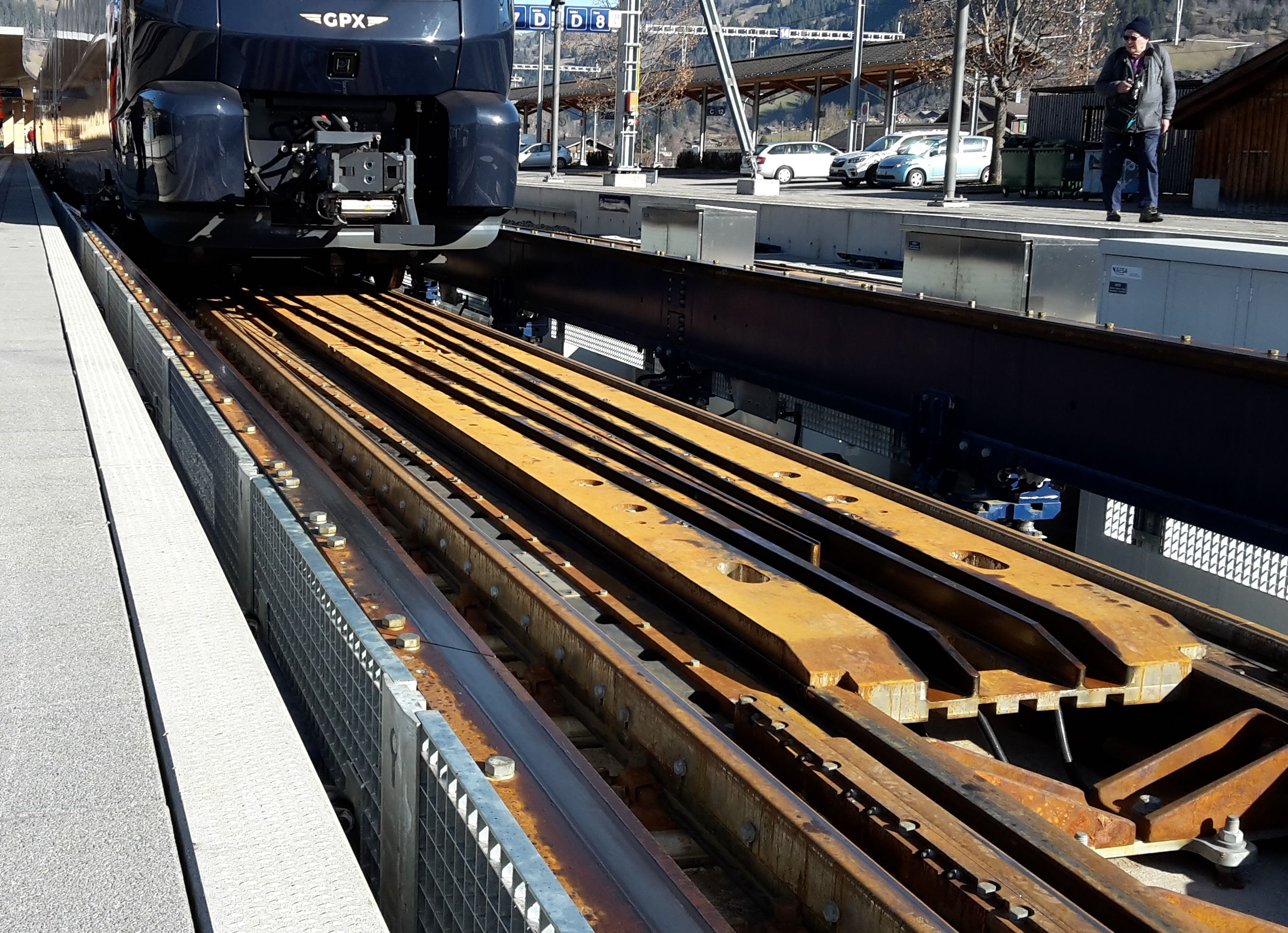
MOB gauge changing system at Zweisimmen

Variable gauge bogies are implemented on the Montreux–Gstaad–Zweisimmen–Spiez–Interlaken line. Trains automatically switch from 1,000 mm (3 ft 3 3/8 in) to 1,435 mm (4 ft 8 1/2 in) at Zweisimmen. The bogie has no axles, which allow the bogie half frames holding the wheels on both sides to slide sideways relative to each other. The EV09-Prose gauge changer at Zweisimmen was satisfactorily tested on 19 June 2019. The system, designed to allow operation on both Montreux Oberland Bernois Railway's (MOB) 1000mm gauge line and BLS AG 1435mm gauge infrastructure, was first implemented on 11 December 2022. Moreover, while the gauge is being automatically changed at Zweisimmen, the air spring mounted on the bogie cross member is automatically adjusted by 200 mm to match the body height with the platform height on the MOB or BLS AG portion of the GoldenPass Express.

=== United Kingdom ===
John Fowler mentions in 1886 at attempt by the GWR to develop a "telescopical" axle.

Trams ran between Leeds (4 ft 8 1/2 in or 1,435 mm standard gauge) and Bradford (4 ft or 1,219 mm gauge) following a successful trial in 1906 using Bradford tram car number 124. The system was later patented by – GB190601695 (A) of 1906. This system was improved again in patent GB190919655 (A) of 1909 by introducing a locking system acting on the wheel and axle rather than just the wheel rim. This provided a more effective grip where the wheel was free to move along the splined axle.

== Comparison with bogie exchange ==
=== Time taken ===
In VGA, the train is pulled through the "adjuster" at about 15 km/h (9.3 mph) without any need to uncouple the wagons or disconnect (and test) the brake equipment. Alternatively, as the train need not be uncoupled, the locomotive may pull the coupled carriages all together.

See Talgo Gauge Changer.

=== Locomotives ===
Steam locomotive are generally not gauge convertible on-the-fly. While diesel locomotives can be bogie exchanged, this is not normally done owing to the complexity in the reconnection of cables and hoses. In Australia, some locomotives are transferred between gauges. The transfer might happen every few months, but not for an individual trip.

By 2004, variable gauge electric passenger locomotives were available from Talgo. It is not clear if variable gauge freight locomotives are available.

==== Electric ====
- L-9202 is an experimental high speed Bo-Bo dual voltage (3 kV DC/25 kV AC) VGA locomotive.
- Talgo 250 locomotives were also planned to haul dual-voltage variable-gauge trainsets from Montpellier 200 km (124 mi) from the border to Barcelona and Madrid. Two Talgo 250 power cars haul 11 passenger trailer cars.
- EMU

=== Weight ===
- A gauge adjustable bogie complete with wheelsets weighs a total of about one ton/tonne more than a conventional bogie and normally must use disc brakes, which cool more slowly.

== History ==
- 1915. C. W. Prosser. – Argus
- 1921. C. R. Prosser. – Argus Friday 8 July 1921
- 1922. J. Grieve. – Argus 19 July 1922

== See also ==
- Alvia
- Axle exchange
- Bogie exchange
- Bradford Corporation Tramways
- Dual couplings
- Gauge Change Train (Japan)
- Interoperability
- Ramsey car-transfer apparatus
- Strizh
- SUW 2000 a form of VGA
