= Mostyska II =

Railway station in the village Mostyska Druhi, Yavoriv Raion in Lviv Oblast of Ukraine

Coordinates: 49°49′00″N 23°01′58″E

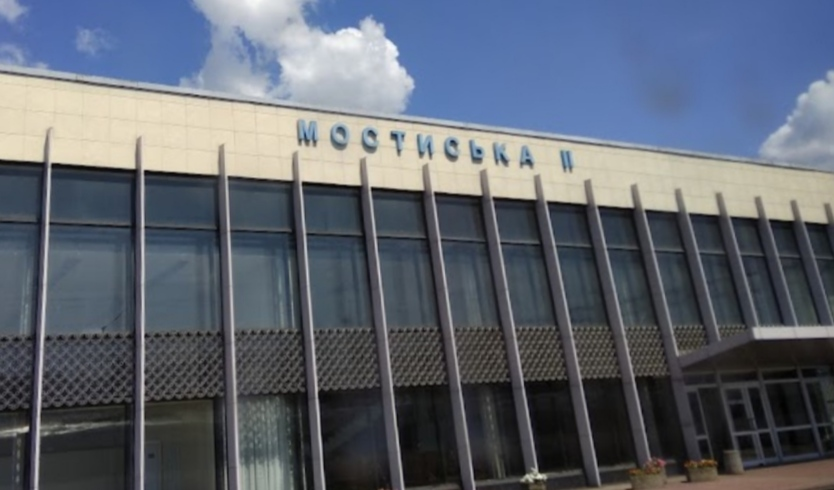
Railway Terminal Mostyska II.

Mostyska II (Ukrainian: Мостиська ІІ) is a railway station in the village Mostyska Druhi, Yavoriv Raion in Lviv Oblast of Ukraine. It is part of the Lviv administration (Lviv Railways).

The station is located on the historical Galician Railway of Archduke Charles Louis linking Kraków with Lviv through Przemyśl.

It was built in 1950 just outside the town of Mostyska, whose station has been renamed to Mostyska I, 8 km (5.0 mi) away from Medyka rail station in Medyka, Poland. Today it constitutes an important transportation gateway between Ukraine and the rest of Europe on the Pan-European Corridor III. There is a break of gauge where the railway systems of the two countries meet, as the Ukrainian part of the route was converted to Russian broad gauge during Soviet rule. To speed up though traffic, a track gauge changing facility of the SUW 2000 variable gauge axle system has been installed to allow fitted trains to pass through the break of gauge at walking pace.

== See also ==
- Poland-Ukraine border

Previous station	Operator	Next Station
Tshchenets	Lviv Railways	Medyka (Poland)
