= Transporter wagon =

Type of railroad wagon

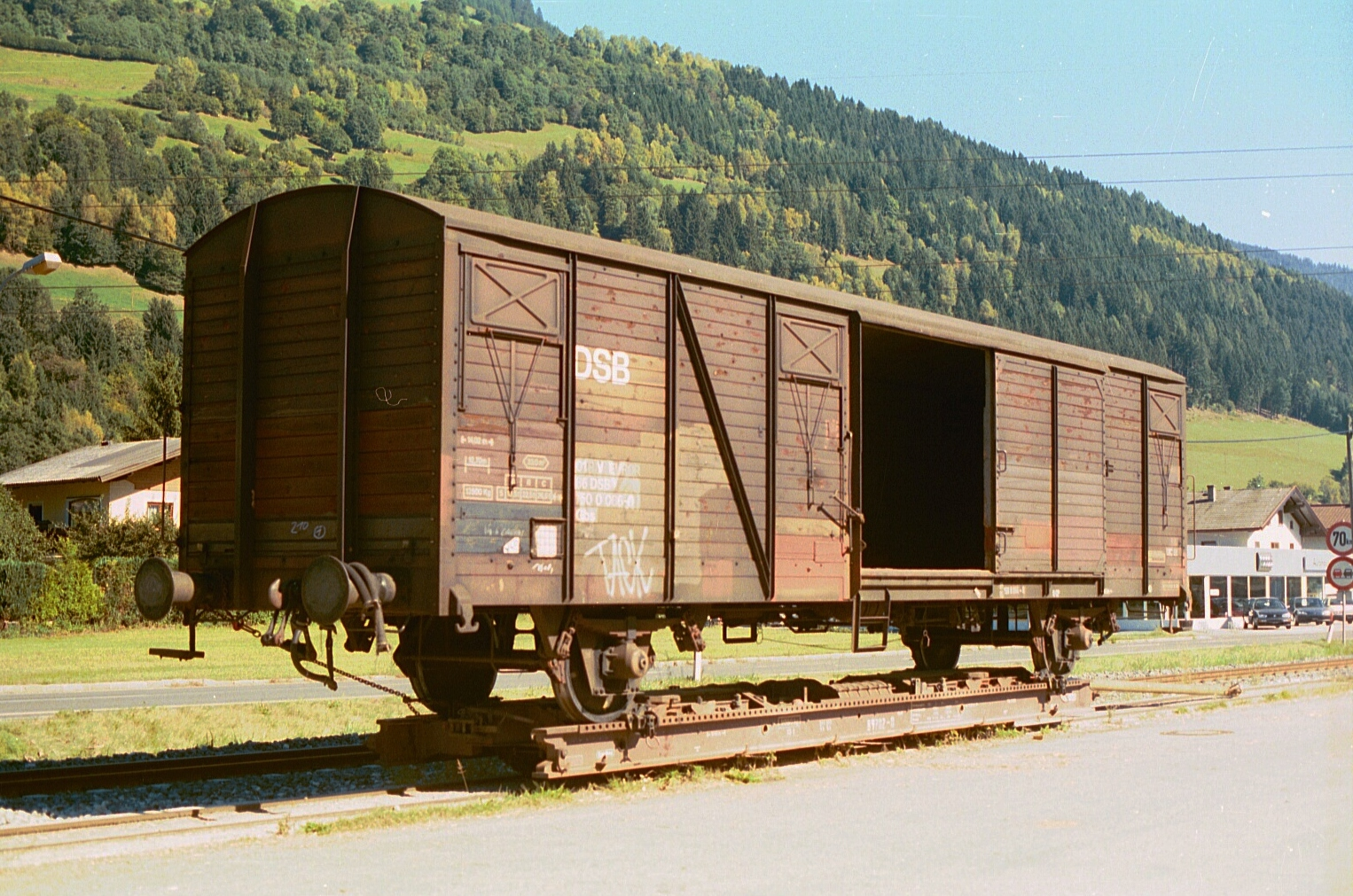
A DSB standard gauge freight car on a narrower gauge transporter wagon

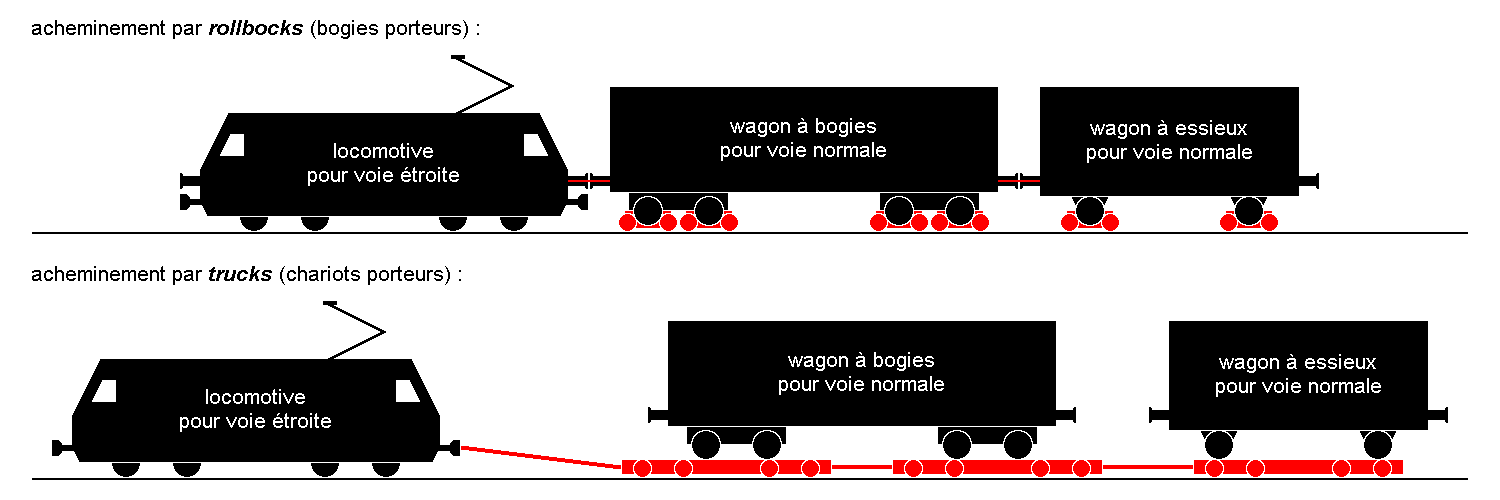
Rollbocks vs transporter wagons

A transporter wagon, in railway terminology, is a wagon (UIC) or railroad car (US) designed to carry other railway equipment. Normally, it is used to transport equipment of a different rail gauge. In most cases, a transporter wagon is a narrower gauge wagon for transporting a wider gauge equipment, allowing freight in a wider gauge wagons to reach destinations on the narrower gauge network without the expense and time of transshipment into a narrower gauge wagons.

This is an attempt to overcome one of the primary problems with differing gauge systems—gauge incompatibility. However, it means that the narrower gauge network must be built to a structure gauge large enough to accommodate the loading gauge of the wider gauge equipment, negating one of the cost advantages of a narrower gauge construction.

Additionally, a large wider gauge wagon balanced on a narrower gauge transporter wagon is not very stable, and is generally restricted to low speeds of 15 mph (24.1 km/h) or so. In Germany this was very restrictive, but in Austria the maximum speed is 40 km/h for loaded transporters und 50 km/h for empty ones, also in Switzerland the allowed speed is in this range.

Transporter wagons have seen varying popularity. They were quite common in Germany (where they are called Rollwagen), Austria, Switzerland (here called Rollschemel in German and trucs transporteurs in French) and Sweden.

Transporter wagons were uncommon in North America, where the practice of exchanging trucks was more common, as was at one time the case on CN's Newfoundland Railway at Port aux Basques. They were used on the Paw Paw Railroad of Paw Paw, Michigan for a short time, and on a short stretch of track of the defunct Bradford, Bordell and Kinzua Railroad by lumberman Elisha Kent Kane. They were used in the United Kingdom on the Leek and Manifold Valley Light Railway.

== Transporter flatcar ==
Transporter wagons were used extensively for a great many years in Germany, Austria (gauge 760 mm or 2 ft 5 15/16 in), Switzerland (1,000 mm or 3 ft 3 3/8 in Brünigbahn) and Sweden (gauges 802 mm or 2 ft 7 9/16 in, 891 mm or 2 ft 11 3/32 in, and 1,067 mm or 3 ft 6 in). This was a boon especially to exchange traffic on the extensive Swedish 891 mm (2 ft 11 3/32 in) network, which once comprised almost 2,000 km (1,243 mi) - in fact a number of local country areas in southern Sweden had nearly no 1,435 mm (4 ft 8 1/2 in) standard gauge lines at all, just narrow gauge ones. On the other hand, Rollböcke were not much used there.

An interesting development of the original transporter wagon concept (with bar couplers between each wagon) was that the bar couplers were discarded in favour of connecting all standard gauge wagons directly with each other by means of their ordinary buffers and chain coupler. This was tried for a few years in Sweden just before the last narrow gauge freight lines were closed in the 1980s.

Special adaptors could be employed to couple a set of transporter wagons onto the end of an "ordinary" narrow gauge freight train. Continuous braking was no problem, either, as the train air line could be incorporated into the bar couplers, too.

Judging from early literature, the transporter wagon idea came about in Germany sometime around 1880 or 1890 (where in fact, later, Rollböcke were used a lot more than transporters). Transporter wagons with the unique Heberlein-type friction brake system were in daily use in the old GDR (East Germany) well into the late 1980s.

In Britain, they were introduced to the Leek and Manifold Valley Light Railway in 1904 by Everard Calthrop, who also introduced them to the Barsi Light Railway in India of 1897. They carried the bulk of the freight traffic on the Leek and Manifold Valley.

Transporter wagons are widely used to get rolling stock including locomotives from gauge-isolated branch lines to main maintenance centres.

=== Crocodile wagons ===
The South Australian and Victorian Railways used broad gauge transporter wagons to carry narrow gauge rolling stock and locomotives to workshops and other isolated narrow-gauge sections. In South Australia, these were called crocodile wagons.

The GWR also had crocodile wagons. One is in the Didcot Railway Centre

=== Transporter train in Australia ===
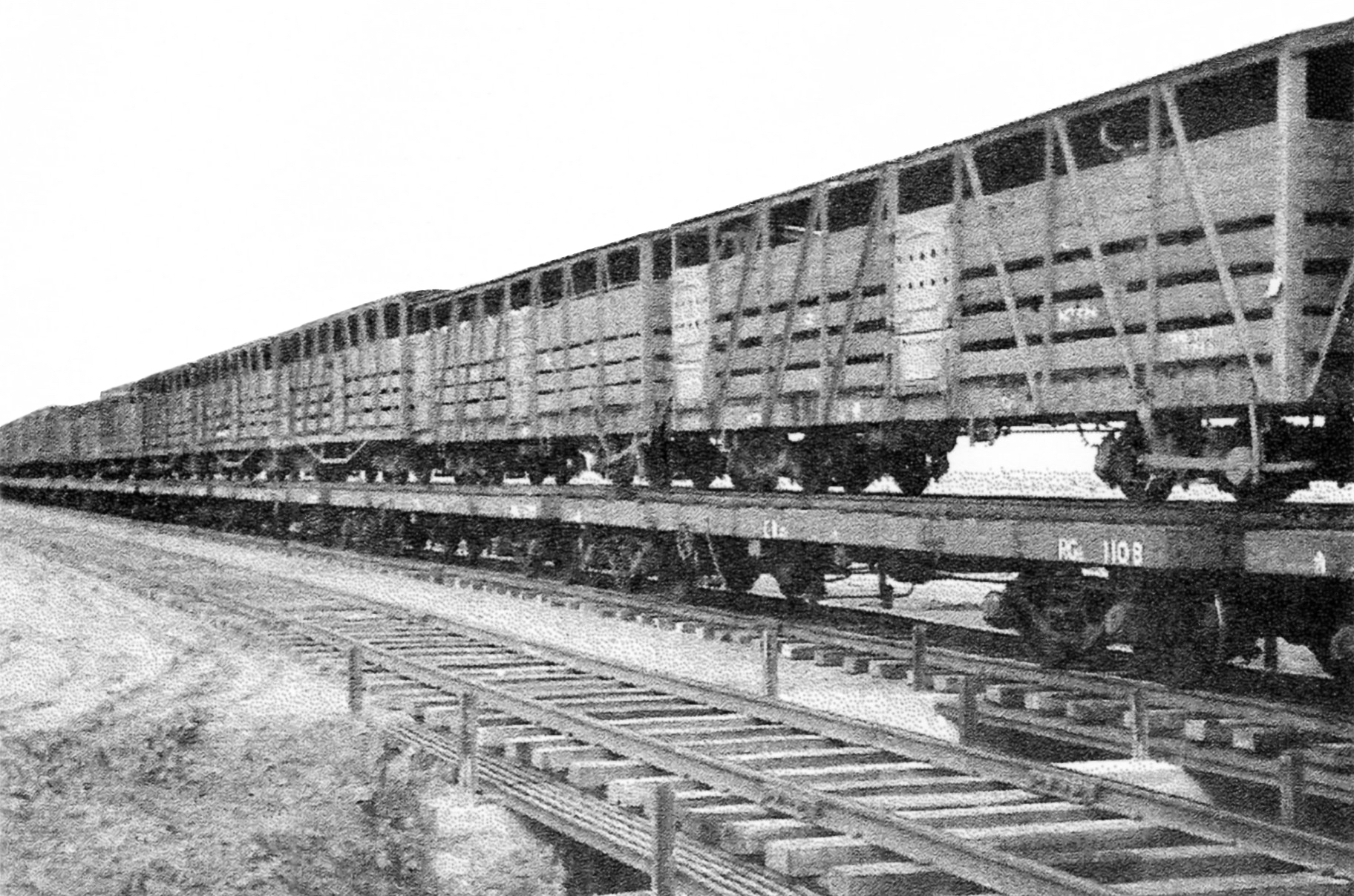
A train of coupled Commonwealth Railways 3 ft 6 in (1,067 mm) narrow-gauge cattle cars on continuous rails laid on 1,435 mm (4 ft 8 1/2 in) standard gauge flatcars (outback Australia)

In 1955, during an intermediate phase of the replacement of the narrow-gauge (1,067 mm or 3 ft 6 in) Port Pirie to Marree railway with a standard gauge line, train-lengths of standard-gauge flat wagons were fitted with narrow-gauge rails, allowing narrow-gauge trains carrying coal (from Leigh Creek coalfield), livestock or general freight to travel more quickly by standard gauge on the new, well-engineered alignment. The rails on the flat wagons were continuous, so that the upper train could be rolled on and off in one piece. The leading wagon on the narrow-gauge train was also secured to anchoring on the front wagon on the standard gauge train. Air brakes on the narrow-gauge train were connected to the standard-gauge train's air brakes. A narrow-gauge locomotive pushed the narrow-gauge train up an earthen ramp to the deck of the standard gauge train. There were no overhead structures to restrict operation of the trains.

=== Train on Train ===
"Train on Train" was a Japan Railways concept, similar to the South Australian scheme above, for hauling narrow-gauge container wagons at speeds of up to 200 km/h (120 mph) on standard-gauge Shinkansen track through the 53.85 km (33.46 mi) long, undersea Seikan Tunnel.

=== Transporter transfer stations ===
Between c1900 and c1950 transporter trains were used to carry narrow gauge (762 mm or 2 ft 6 in) rolling stock between four separate narrow gauge branchlines and the workshops. The main lines were 1,600 mm (5 ft 3 in) gauge. A ramp joined the narrow and broad gauge track end to end in a straight line and the ramp lifted the narrow gauge track by about one metre to the level of the rails on the broad gauge flat waggons.

- Upper Ferntree Gully - Gembrook
- Colac- Crowes
- Moe - Walhalla
- Wangaratta - Whitfield
- Newport workshops

== Transporter trailer ==
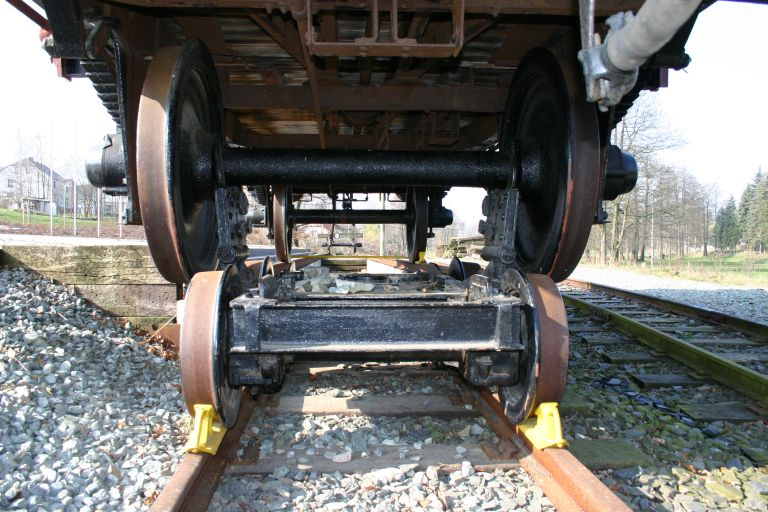
Transporter trailer

Also common on German and eastern European narrower gauge are transporter trailers, which are small-wheeled full trailers that fit beneath each pair of the wagon's wheels or each bogie of the car and are hauled by a drawbar. These are Rollböcke in German. Some times one long small-wheeled full trailer carries the entire rail car.

== Road Transporter Trains ==
Transporter Trains are also used to carry road vehicles such as cars, lorries and buses through long rail tunnels. For long distance freight transport, trucks with trailers or semi-trailers (without tractor) are loaded on specialized rail vehicles. See articles about

- Autorack
- Car shuttle train
- car transporter
- Modalohr
- Motorail
- Rolling highway

== See also ==
- East African Railway Master Plan
- Keith Smith (engineer) - devised transporting vehicles by the trainload in Australia the 1950s
- Leek and Manifold Valley Light Railway 1904 used a Rollbock like wagon.
- Padarn Railway
- Piggyback (transportation)
- Weltrol – a standard gauge well wagon for carrying narrow gauge rolling stock; built 1960
