= Paw Paw Railroad =

Railroad in Michigan

Overview
- Headquarters: Paw Paw, Michigan
- Locale: Van Buren County, Michigan
- Dates of operation: 1857–1887
- Successor: Toledo and South Haven Railroad

Technical
- Track gauge: 3 ft (914 mm)
- Previous gauge: 1,435 mm (4 ft 8 1/2 in)
- Length: 4 miles (6.4 km)

The Paw Paw Railroad is a defunct railroad which operated in Van Buren County, Michigan, between 1857 and 1887. At a length of 4 miles (6.4 km), it was the shortest operating common carrier railroad in the state. Later (from 1902 until January 15, 1982), the Ludington & Northern Railway Company, at 2.79 miles (4.49 km), stripped the Paw Paw of its title as "shortest Michigan Railroad".

The Michigan Central Railroad had originally planned to reach the coast of Lake Michigan at St. Joseph, but these plans changed and the company built to New Buffalo instead. This meant that instead of passing through Paw Paw, the line passed through Lawton, some four miles (6 km) to the south. A group of local businessmen incorporated the Paw Paw Railroad on April 25, 1857, to construct a railway line from Paw Paw to Lawton, where it would join the Michigan Central. An initial attempt, which aimed east of Lawton, resulted in the partial creation of a grade but no track was laid. The so-called "calico grade" was later developed, briefly, by the Kalamazoo, Lake Shore & Chicago. A second attempt, in 1867, led to the completion in September of that year of a 4-mile (6.4 km) line between Paw Paw and Lawton, which was opened for public use. This constituted the total physical extent of the Paw Paw.

The line was originally built as 4 ft 8 1/2 in (1,435 mm) standard gauge, but in 1875 the Paw Paw's original owners were bought out by the owners of the Toledo and South Haven Railroad (T&SH), a 3 ft (914 mm) narrow gauge line which ran west from Paw Paw to Lawrence. The two companies remained separate, but in 1877 the Paw Paw's line was converted to 3 ft (914 mm) gauge to permit joint operations.

On March 7, 1887 the Paw Paw merged with the T&SH and ceased to exist as an independent company. Throughout its history, the Paw Paw was specifically exempt from those sections of Michigan's railroad law which regulated rates and fares.

In 1898 the South Haven & Eastern (successor to the T&SH) converted the T&SH's lines, including the Paw Paw–Lawton segment, back to 4 ft 8 1/2 in (1,435 mm) standard gauge. In 1903 it passed along with the SH&E to the Pere Marquette Railway, which finally abandoned the line in 1941.
