= Bogie exchange =

System for operating railway wagons on two or more gauges

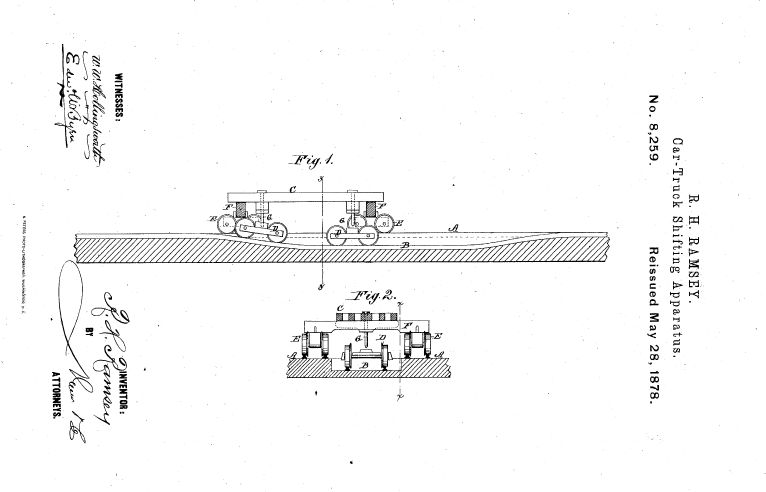
A drawing of the Ramsey car-transfer apparatus from the patent application

Bogie exchange is a system for operating railway wagons on two or more gauges to overcome difference in the track gauge. To perform a bogie exchange, a car is converted from one gauge to another by removing the bogies or trucks (the chassis containing the wheels and axles of the car), and installing a new bogie with differently spaced wheels. It is generally limited to wagons and carriages, though the bogies on diesel locomotives can be exchanged if enough time is available.

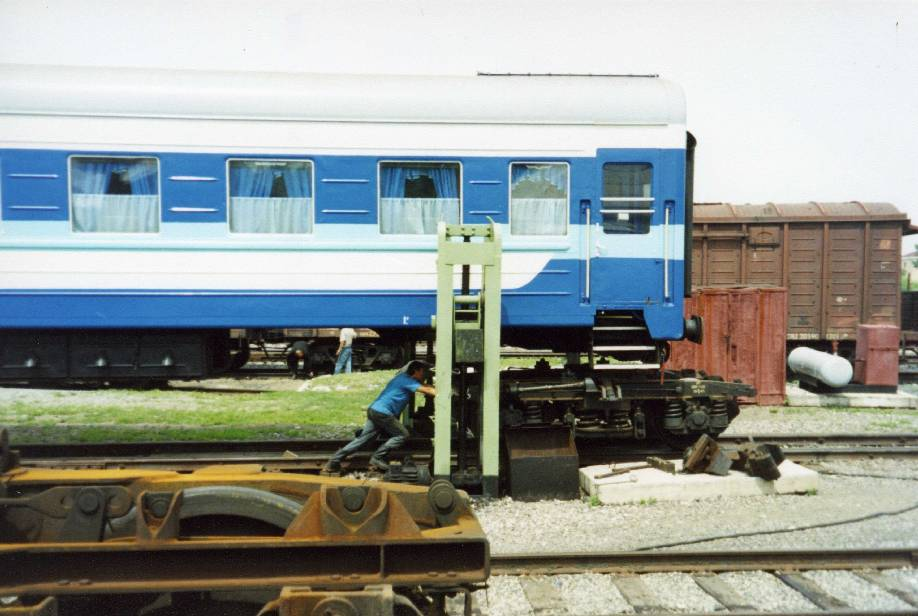
Bogies exchange operation in Ussuriisk (near Vladivostok) at the Chinese–Russian border

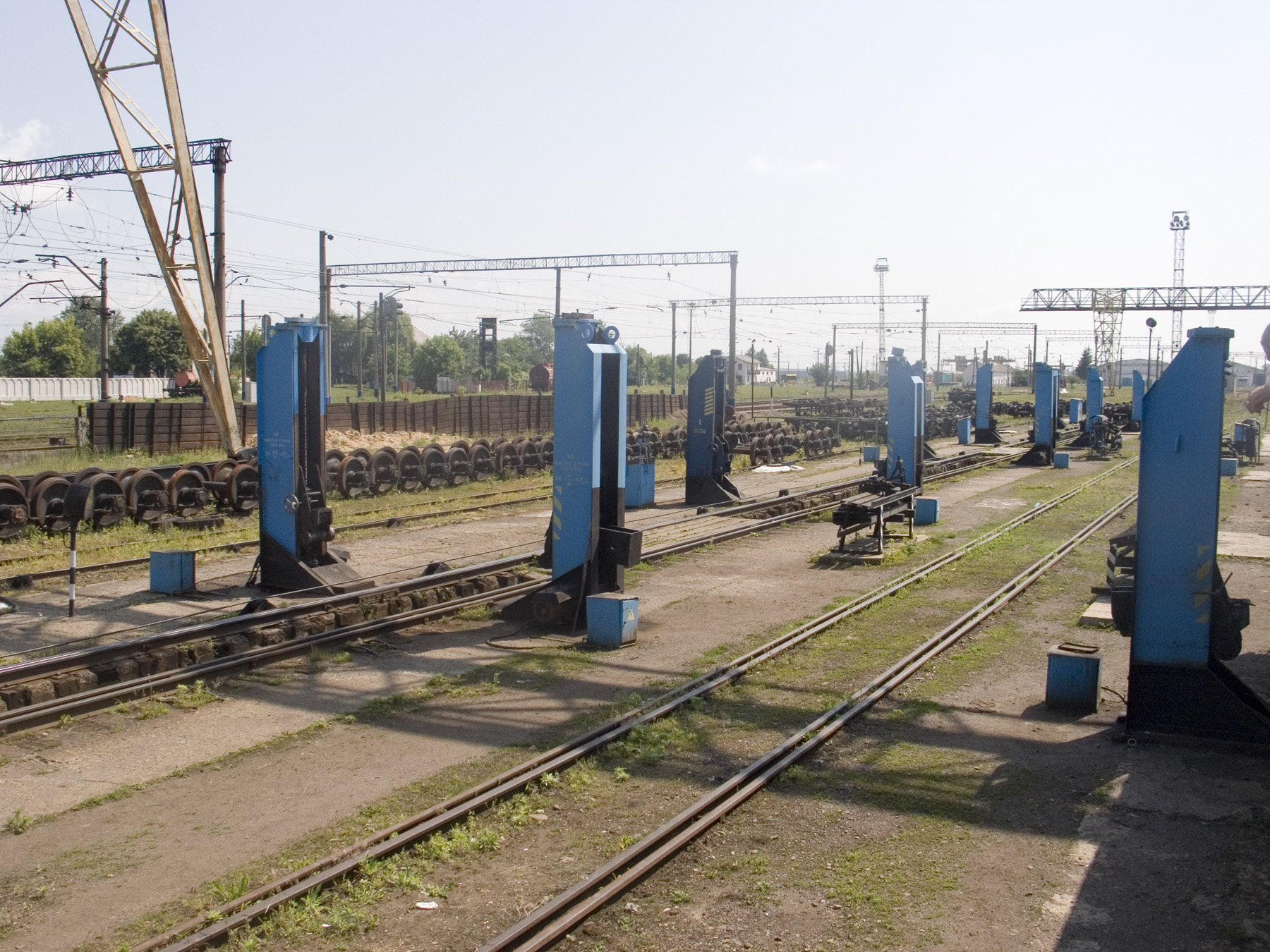
Bogie change station at Chop railway station in Ukraine, which connects to Hungary and Slovakia

The term can also refer to the rebuilding of rolling-stock for permanent use on another gauge, e.g. the Little Joe electric locomotives intended for the Soviet Union (Russian gauge) which were rebuilt for use in the United States, or the New Zealand British Rail Mark 2 carriage rebuilt for use on the NZR Cape gauge.

== Engines ==
=== Steam ===
Steam locomotives can be designed for more than one gauge, by having, for example, reversible wheel hubs that suit two alternative gauges. This was done in the 1930s and beyond in Victoria for possible gauge conversion, though no engines were ever converted in this manner other than one heritage engine (R766). Some 1,000 mm (3 ft 3 3/8 in) metre gauge Garratt locomotives of East Africa were designed for easy conversion to 3 ft 6 in (1,067 mm) gauge, though again none ever was.

In 1944, the LMS re-gauged a pair of "Jinty" 0-6-0 tank locomotives – originally built to UK 4 ft 8 1/2 in (1,435 mm) standard gauge – for use on its 5 ft 3 in (1,600 mm) gauge Northern Counties Committee (NCC) lines in Northern Ireland; re-designated as Class Y, they largely undertook shunting work on dockyard lines in Belfast. The re-gauging was performed by simply reversing the wheel centres so that the spokes dished outwards.

In the southern United States, some steam locomotives built by Baldwin were designed for easy conversion from 5 ft (1,524 mm) to 4 ft 8 1/2 in (1,435 mm) standard gauge.

=== Diesel ===
Diesel locomotives have bogies like wagons and carriages, only with more cables for the traction motors and take a little longer to convert. In Australia, some classes of diesel locomotives are regularly gauge-converted to suit traffic requirements on the 1,435 mm (4 ft 8 1/2 in), 1,600 mm (5 ft 3 in), and 1,067 mm (3 ft 6 in) networks.

Since the 1,067 mm (3 ft 6 in) networks in Australia are not all connected to each other, being separated by deserts or lines of other gauges, they are bogie-exchanged or piggybacked on road or rail vehicles when transferred between these networks.

=== Electric ===
The Little Joe electric locomotives intended for the Soviet Union were rebuilt for use in the United States.

== Raising or lowering ==
=== Raise ===
The simplest way to carry out bogie exchange (to change their gauge) is to lift the wagons off one of their sets of bogies and replace them back on another, new set of bogies. This may require the wagons in a train to be uncoupled, and continuous brakes disconnected. If the wagons are swung out of the way by an overhead hoist, they may sway, which wastes time settling them down.

The pin that centres the bogies and the hoses and fittings for the brakes must be compatible. A generous supply of bogies of each gauge is needed to accommodate the ebb and flow of traffic. The bogies and wagons also need to have standardized hooks, etc., where they may be efficiently lifted. The two wheel sets on four-wheel wagons can be changed as well if the wagon has been designed accordingly.

The Nutter hoist, patented in 1871, used screw jacks to lift cars off of their bogies. The Imboden railway-car lifter, from 1875, used a steam cylinder to wedge the car into the air.

=== Lower ===
Another way of carrying out bogie exchange is to lower the bogies onto a trolley in a pit, after which the trolleys are rolled out of the way and others return. This may allow the train couplings and continuous brakes to remain connected. In addition, the bogies never need leave a solid surface, so they can be wheeled in and out more quickly. This method was used at Dry Creek railway station, Adelaide.

Charles Tisdale patented a system of ramps and moving supports for lowering the trucks out from under a railroad car in 1873. George Atkinson patented a hoist and transfer table arrangement in 1882; this dropped the bogies from under a car and shift them to the side. Ramsay's apparatus patented in 1884 used hydraulic jacks to support the car while lowering the track with the bogies out from under it.

== Countries ==
=== Australia ===
Between 1961 and 1995, Australia had five bogie exchange centres, which opened and closed as gauge conversion work proceeded. The gauges served were 1,435 mm (4 ft 8 1/2 in) and 1,600 mm (5 ft 3 in), though the 1,067 mm (3 ft 6 in) Queensland did acquire 100 bogie-exchange compatible QLX wagons just in case. All the wagons involved had wagon codes ending in "X", such as VLX.

The centres were:

- Dynon, Melbourne, Victoria
- Wodonga near Albury on state border.
- Port Pirie, South Australia
- Peterborough, South Australia
- Dry Creek, Adelaide, South Australia – the youngest and most modern

The busiest facility was that at Dynon, in a typical year (1981–82), 24,110 wagons were bogie exchanged, an average of 66 per day. This was done by one shift of 18 men, compared with the 100 men required if the same amount of freight were transferred wagon to wagon.

=== Belarus ===
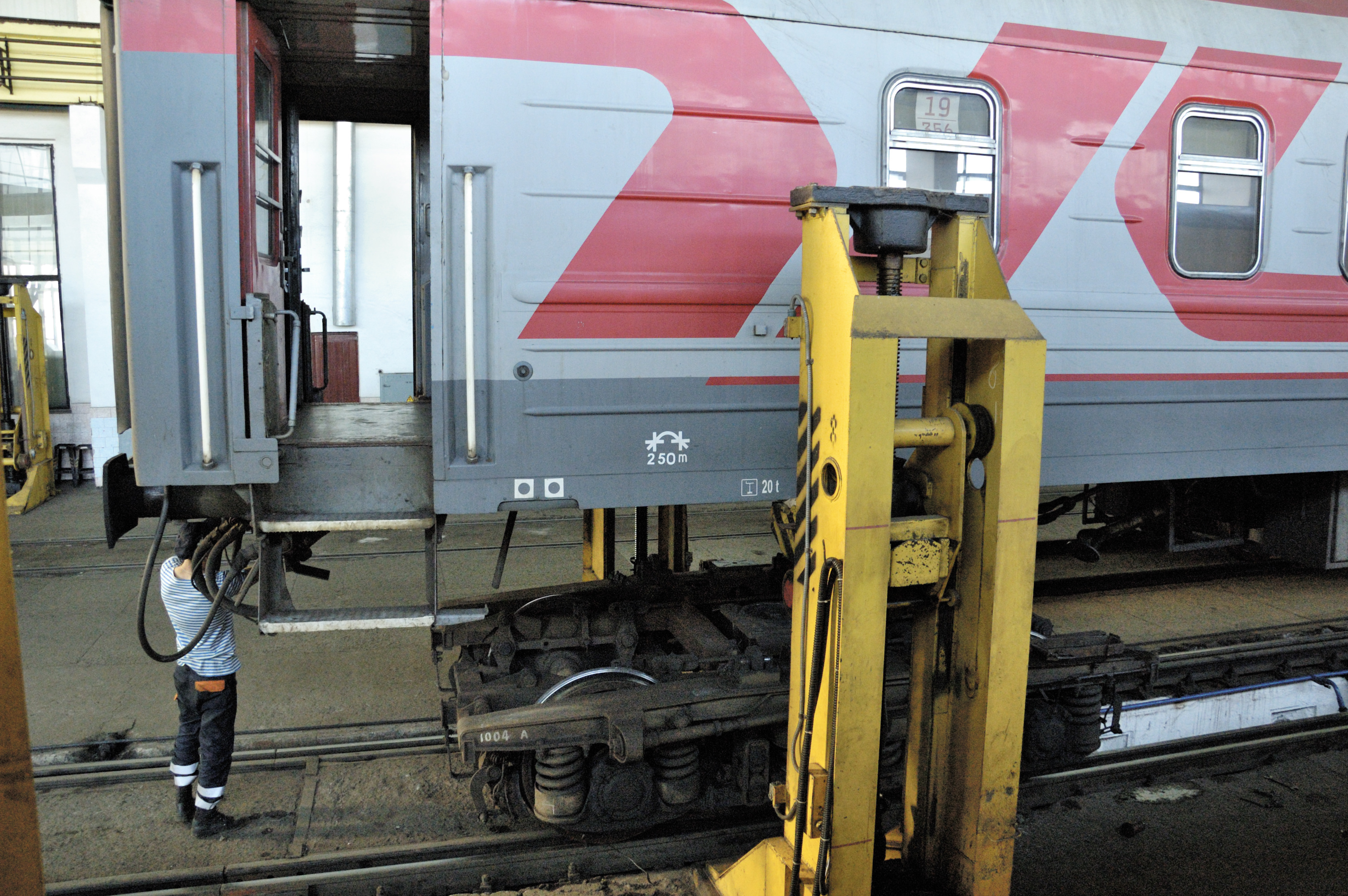
Bogie exchange in Brest

- Brest, Belarus – between 1,520 mm (4 ft 11 27/32 in) gauge and 1,435 mm (4 ft 8 1/2 in) standard gauge at the border to Poland

=== Bolivia ===
Bogie exchange was used between 2 ft 6 in (762 mm) and 1,000 mm (3 ft 3 3/8 in) gauge on the Ferrocarril de Antofagasta a Bolivia Railway.

=== Canada ===
- Between 1,435 mm (4 ft 8 1/2 in) standard gauge and the 3 ft 6 in (1,067 mm) of the former Newfoundland Railway (Terra Transport) at Port aux Basques

=== China ===
A bogie exchange station exists at the Chinese border to Mongolia. Both the Moscow-Beijing passenger train (Trans-Siberian) and freight trains get their bogies exchanged. Mongolia has 1,520 mm (4 ft 11 27/32 in), China has 1,435 mm (4 ft 8 1/2 in) standard gauge. Also, a bogie exchange station was placed farther east at the Russian–Chinese border crossing at Zabaykalsk/Manzhouli. Also, China and ex-soviet countries use the different type coupler (Janney and SA-3). An adapter may be used.

=== Finland ===
A bogie exchange station exists in the Port of Turku with a short stretch of 1,435 mm (4 ft 8 1/2 in) gauge railway. Freight cars get their bogies exchanged. SeaRail train ferries go from Germany and Sweden. They carry no passenger trains, and passengers must walk to Turku Harbour railway station opposite the ferry terminals. Finland has 1,524 mm (5 ft) broad gauge.

A similar station was built in Tornio in 2022 to facilitate train transport between Sweden and Finland along the dual-gauge Tornio–Haparanda railway and into Sweden's 1,435 mm (4 ft 8 1/2 in) gauge network. The link had become more important as Finland closed its border with Russia.

=== Germany ===
In 1898, Emil Breidsprecher, a director of the Marienburg–Mława railway and a future professor at the Königliche Technische Hochschule zu Danzig, invented a system that allowed to change wheelsets in wagons that travelled across a break of gauge, without the need to unload them first. In September 1901, a facility was installed at the then German-Russian border at Iłowo. The system was used until 1914 on some railway border crossings between Russia and states using standard gauge. Known locations, in addition to Iłowo, are Łódź (then an industrial centre served by both standard and broad gauge railway lines) and Novoselytsia (then Austrian-Russian border). There were also some small installations to meet local demand. As of 1938, the sole facility operated at Zdolbuniv at the then Polish-Soviet border.

A bogie exchange station in the port of Mukran serves train ferries that go to and from Russia, Latvia, and Lithuania, which have 1,520 mm (4 ft 11 27/32 in) broad gauge.

=== Iran ===
- (Iran) (Azerbaijan) Jolfa – c. 1950, between 1,435 mm (4 ft 8 1/2 in) and 1,520 mm (4 ft 11 27/32 in) (Russian gauge)
- (Iran) (Turkmenistan) Sarakhs – c. 1990, between 1,435 mm (4 ft 8 1/2 in) and 1,520 mm (4 ft 11 27/32 in) (Russian gauge)
- (Iran) (Pakistan) Zahedan – 2009, between 1,435 mm (4 ft 8 1/2 in) and 1,676 mm (5 ft 6 in) (Indian gauge)
- (Iran) (Azerbaijan) Baku – 2012, To be developed in Amirabad port, Caspian Sea, between 1,435 mm (4 ft 8 1/2 in) and 1,520 mm (4 ft 11 27/32 in) (Russian gauge)

=== Kazakhstan ===
- (Kazakhstan) Druzhba, KZ – (China) Alashankou, CN between 1,520 mm (4 ft 11 27/32 in) and 1,435 mm (4 ft 8 1/2 in).

=== Moldova ===
- (Moldova) (Romania) Ungheni between 1,520 mm (4 ft 11 27/32 in) and 1,435 mm (4 ft 8 1/2 in).
- Ungheni-Iași
- Cantemir-Falciu
- Giurgiulești-Galați

=== North Korea ===
- Tumangan, North Korea – between 1,435 mm (4 ft 8 1/2 in) and 1,520 mm (4 ft 11 27/32 in) (Russian gauge) at the border to Russia.

The bogies of the direct sleeping car Moscow – Pyongyang, which runs twice monthly, are exchanged there.

=== Peru ===
- Between 1,435 mm (4 ft 8 1/2 in) standard gauge and 3 ft (914 mm) between the Ferrocarril Central Andino and the Ferrocarril Huancayo - Huancavelica, including locomotives The latter is now 1,435 mm (4 ft 8 1/2 in). This change was completed by October 2010.

=== Romania ===
- (Romania) Vadul Siret between 1,435 mm (4 ft 8 1/2 in) and 1,520 mm (4 ft 11 27/32 in) at the border with Ukraine.
- (Romania) Halmeu between 1,435 mm (4 ft 8 1/2 in) and 1,520 mm (4 ft 11 27/32 in) at the border with Ukraine.
- (Romania) Ungheni between 1,435 mm (4 ft 8 1/2 in) and 1,520 mm (4 ft 11 27/32 in) at the border with Moldova.

=== Russia ===
- (Russia) Zabaikalsk (450 km from Chita) with China
- (Russia) Grodekovo (116 km from Ussuriisk and 224 km from Vladivostok) with China
- (Russia) Khasan - North Korea (315 km from Vladivostok).
- (Russia) Kholmsk, Sakhalin Island. The bogie exchange is necessary to enable Russian mainland cars to run on the Sakhalin railways, which use the 3 ft 6 in (1,067 mm) gauge.
- (Russia) (Poland) Kaliningrad

=== Spain ===
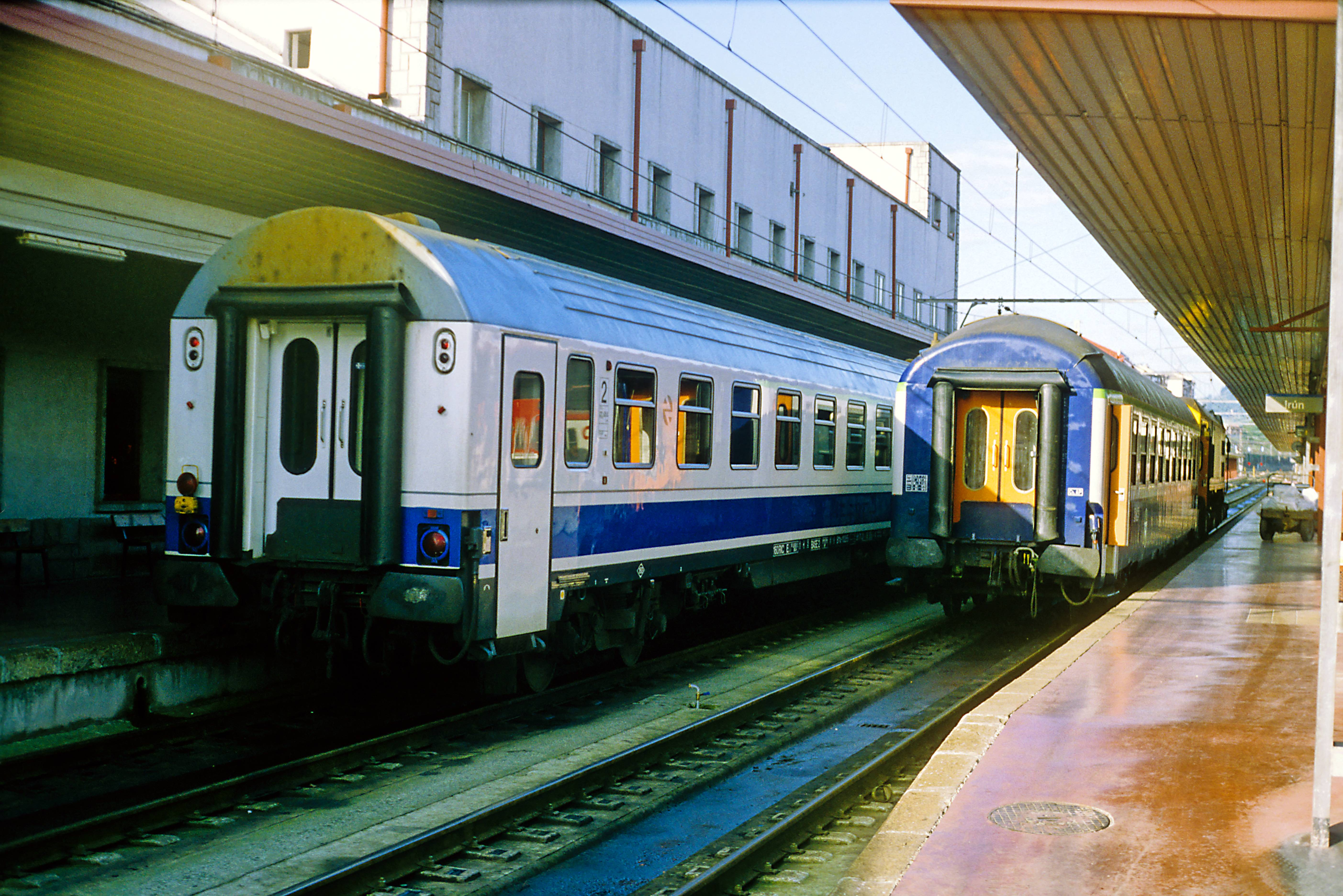
A Paris–Algeciras through coach (at right) being shunted for bogie exchange at Irun railway station, Spain, 1993

- At (Spain) (France) Irun, between 1,435 mm (4 ft 8 1/2 in) standard gauge and 1,668 mm (5 ft 5 21/32 in) Iberian gauge
- At (Spain) (France) Portbou, between 1,435 mm (4 ft 8 1/2 in) and 1,668 mm (5 ft 5 21/32 in)

=== Tunisia ===
- Between 1,435 mm (4 ft 8 1/2 in) standard gauge and 1,000 mm (3 ft 3 3/8 in) metre gauge, including locomotives

=== Ukraine ===
- (Ukraine) Chop (respectively Mukachevo since 2018) between 1,520 mm (4 ft 11 27/32 in) (Russian gauge) and 1,435 mm (4 ft 8 1/2 in) at the border to Hungary and Slovakia.
- (Ukraine) Jagodin between 1,520 mm (4 ft 11 27/32 in) (Russian gauge) and 1,435 mm (4 ft 8 1/2 in) at the border to Poland.
- (Ukraine) Mostyska between 1,520 mm (4 ft 11 27/32 in) (Russian gauge) and 1,435 mm (4 ft 8 1/2 in) at the border to Poland.

=== United States ===
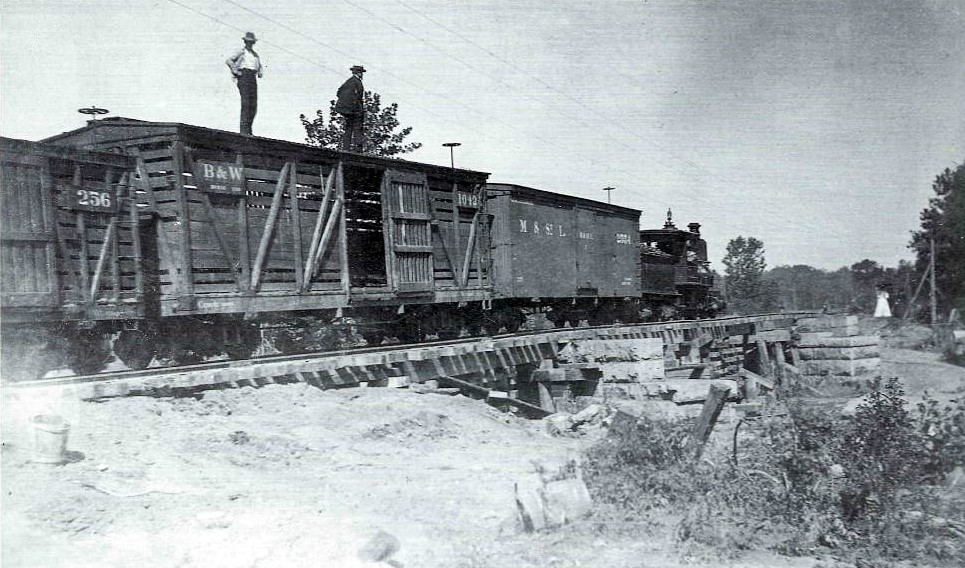
A Burlington and Western train in 1898. Two standard-gauge cars riding on narrow-gauge trucks head the train.

- The Burlington and Northwestern Railway used an unknown hoist in the 1890s to run standard gauge cars on narrow gauge trucks.
- The Cairo and Fulton Railroad (5-foot gauge) used a Nutter hoist at Texarkana in the 1870s to exchange with standard gauge lines.
- The Denver and Rio Grande Western Railroad also used an unknown hoist in the 1890s to run standard gauge cars on narrow gauge trucks.
- The East Broad Top used their timber-transfer hoist in the 1930s to shift standard gauge cars onto narrow gauge trucks. In the early 2020's, the heritage operation restoring the railroad announced their intent to acquire several period appropriate standard gauge cars to regauge to represent the practice in photo charters.
- The Erie Railway used a Nutter hoist at Urbana, Ohio to interchange between 6 ft (1,829 mm) and standard gauge from 1871 until no later than 1878.
- The Illinois Central Railroad used a Nutter hoist at Cairo, Illinois to interchange between its standard gauge equipment with the 5 ft (1,524 mm) of the Mississippi Central from 1874 until the standardization of the latter.
- (United States) The standard-gauge International–Great Northern Railroad and the narrow-gauge National Railroad of Mexico used an unknown hoist at Laredo, Texas in the 1890s to exchange trucks to permit through traffic.
- The Sedalia, Warsaw and South Western Railway used an unknown hoist in the 1890s to run standard gauge cars on narrow gauge trucks as well. The accepted practice was to couple standard gauge cars immediately behind the engine, ahead of any narrow gauge cars in the train.
- The Virginia Midland Railway and the Richmond and Danville Railroad installed two Nutter car hoists in north Danville, Virginia in 1882 to deal with the break of gauge between those lines.
- The Bradford, Bordell and Kinzua Railroad (later part of the Pittsburgh and Western Railroad) used an unknown hoist in the 1890s to interchange between 3 ft (914 mm) and standard gauge.

== Transfer time ==
Bogie exchange conversion times were:

- Dynon, Australia – one rail car every 7.3 minutes
- Brest – one rail car takes less than 1 hour
- Zabaykalsk – one rail car takes 5–6 hours
- Erenhot – one rail car takes 5–6 hours
- Cairo, Illinois – in 1874, 16-18 freight cars per hour (2 at a time), 15 minutes per Pullman car

== Variable gauge axles ==
Variable-gauge axles in an automatic track gauge changeover system (ATGCS) is a newer development and is faster than bogie exchange. The SUW 2000 ATGCS requires a changeover track about 20 metres (66 ft) long, with a shed if snow is around compared to a small marshalling yard required by bogie exchange.

== Axle exchange ==
An alternative to variable gauge axles and bogie exchange is wheelset exchange.

== See also ==
- Eurasian Land Bridge
- Gauge conversion
- Mungindi railway line
- Qazaqstan Temir Zholy
- Ramsey car-transfer apparatus
- Rollbock
- SeaRail
- Transporter wagon
- Variable gauge axles
- Wheelset
