= Maree =

Maree is a given name and surname. It may be used as a variant of Marie. It may refer to:

Given name

- Maree Ackehurst, Australian actress
- Ann-Maree Biggar, Australian television presenter
- Maree Bowden (born 1979), New Zealand netball player
- Adrienne Maree Brown (born 1978), American writer and activist
- Maree Cheatham (born 1940), American actress
- Maree Clarke (born 1961), Australian artist
- Maree Davenport (born 1968), Australian politician
- Maree Edwards (born 1962), Australian politician
- Maree Edwards (born 1975), New Zealand rugby union player
- Maree Fish (born 1963), Australian field hockey player
- Maree Fitzgibbon (born 1966), New Zealand rugby union player
- Maree Gleeson, Australian immunologist
- Maree Holland (born 1963), Australian sprinter
- Maree Jackson (born 1954), Australian basketball player
- Maree Kennedy, Australian judge
- Ann Maree Kerr (born 1967), Australian rhythmic gymnast
- Maree Lowes (born 1987), Australian actress
- Lynn-Maree Milburn, Australian filmmaker
- Maree Montgomery, Australian jazz singer
- Anne-Maree O'Connor, New Zealand investment banker
- Anne-Maree Pearse, Australian cytogeneticist
- Ann-Maree Putney, Australian ten-pin bowler
- Annmaree Roberts (born 1976), Australian sport shooter
- Maree Sheehan (born 1969), New Zealand singer, composer and artist
- Maree Smith, Australian pharmacist and researcher
- Maree Teesson, Australian health professional
- Jan Maree Tennent (born 1960), Australian biomedical researcher
- Maree Thyne, New Zealand academic
- Maree Todd, Scottish politician
- Maree Tomkinson (born 1968), Australian dressage rider
- Katie-Maree Umback (born 1973), Australian para-equestrian
- Maree White (born 1960), Australian basketball player

Surname

- David Maree (born 1989), South African cyclist
- Sydney Maree (born 1956), South African–American athlete
- Theo Maree (born 1995), South African rugby union player
- Trudi Maree (born 1988), South African swimmer
- Vance Maree (1909–1976), American football and basketball player
- William Maree, 19th-century American politician
- ZaZa Maree, American musician

Other uses

- Chasse-marée, archaic type of decked commercial sailing vessel
- Loch Maree, freshwater loch in Scotland
  - Isle Maree, island of Loch Maree
  - Loch Maree and Aultbea Railway, proposed railway
  - Loch Maree Hotel botulism poisoning, 1922 outbreak
- Maree, former state electoral district of Queensland, Australia
- Marée Humaine, 2012 album by Manu Militari
- Marée Noire, disambiguation page

== See also ==
- Mareez (1917–1983), Indian poet
  - Mareez, 2004 biographical play
- Marree (disambiguation)
