= Break of gauge =

Meeting place of different width rail lines

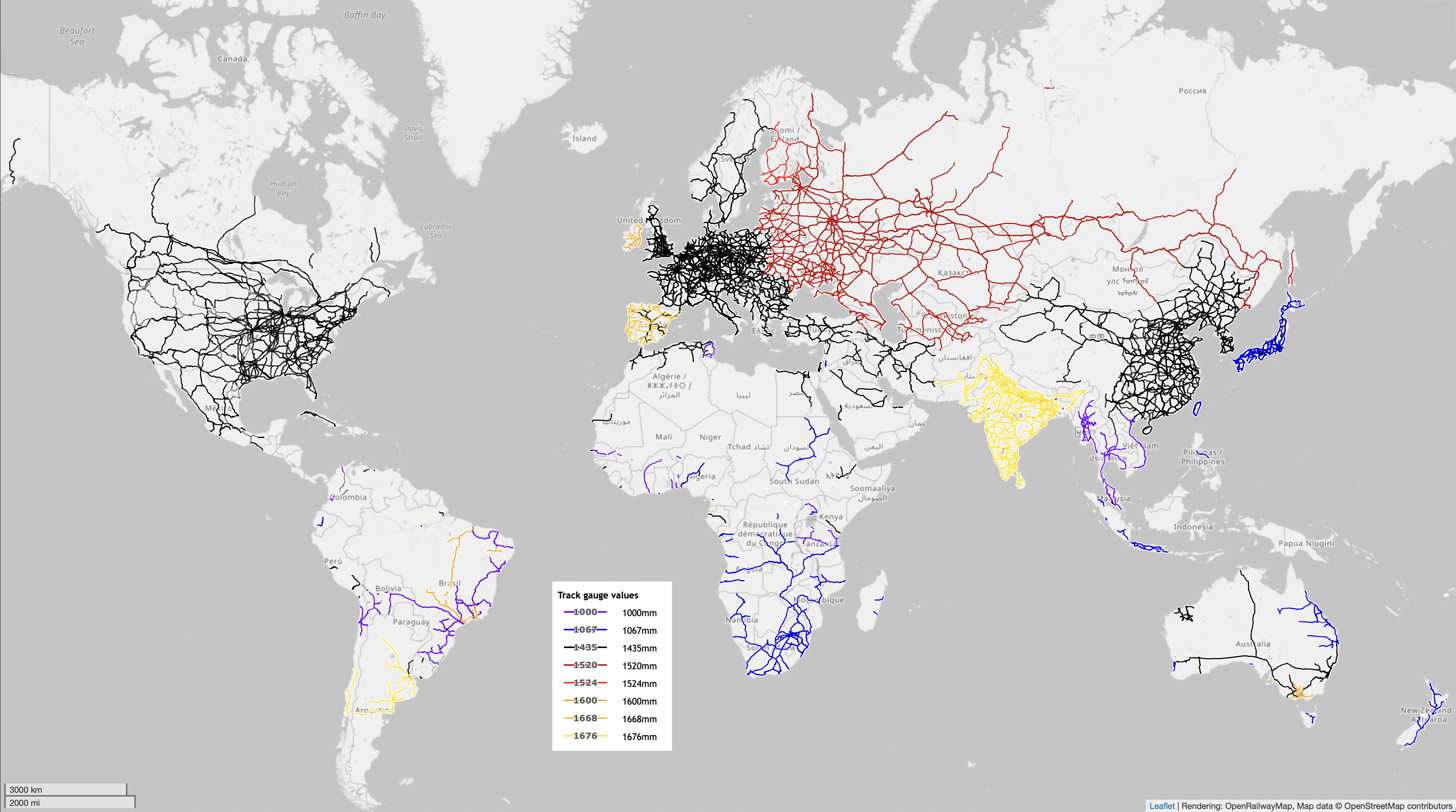
Map of the world's railways showing the different gauges in use. Breaks of gauge generally occur where lines of different track gauge meet.

With railways, a break of gauge occurs where a line of one track gauge (the distance between the rails, or between the wheels of trains designed to run on those rails) meets a line of a different gauge. Trains and rolling stock generally cannot run through without some form of conversion between gauges, leading to passengers having to change trains, and freight having to be transloaded or transshipped. That can cause delays, added costs, and inconvenience to those travelling on affected routes.

== History ==
Break of gauge was a common problem in the early days of railways, because standards had not yet been set and different organizations each used their own favored gauge on the lines they controlled. That was sometimes for mechanical and engineering reasons (optimizing for geography or particular types of load and rolling stock), and sometimes for commercial and competitive reasons (interoperability, or the lack of it, within and between companies and alliances were often key strategic considerations).

Even in the early era of railways in Britain, various solutions other than transloading were conceived,. including rollbocks, transporter wagons, dual gauge track or variable gauge axles, and containerization of freight, but they were not implemented at the height of the Gauge War in the 1840s, which resulted the need for time-consuming and expensive transloading.

In his biography of Isambard Kingdom Brunel (key proponent of the broad gauge for the Great Western Railway), L. T. C. Rolt remarks on the apparent mysteriousness of that lack of implementation, but a likely explanation is that the combatants at the time were primarily interested in winning the Gauge War, and establishing a standard that benefited their commercial interests.

The lack of a standardized gauge was a significant problem in transportation in the Confederate States of America during the American Civil War.

See the examples section below for a range of international examples of different types, including a break of gauge in Gloucester, which was the earliest significant break of gauge between the 1,435 mm (4 ft 8 1/2 in) and 7 ft 1/4 in (2,140 mm) systems, and the first break of gauge between Russian and standard gauge built in 1861 between the border stations of Eydtkuhnen (then East Prussia, now Russia) and Kybartai (then Russia, now Lithuania).

== Overcoming a break of gauge ==
=== Transloading ===
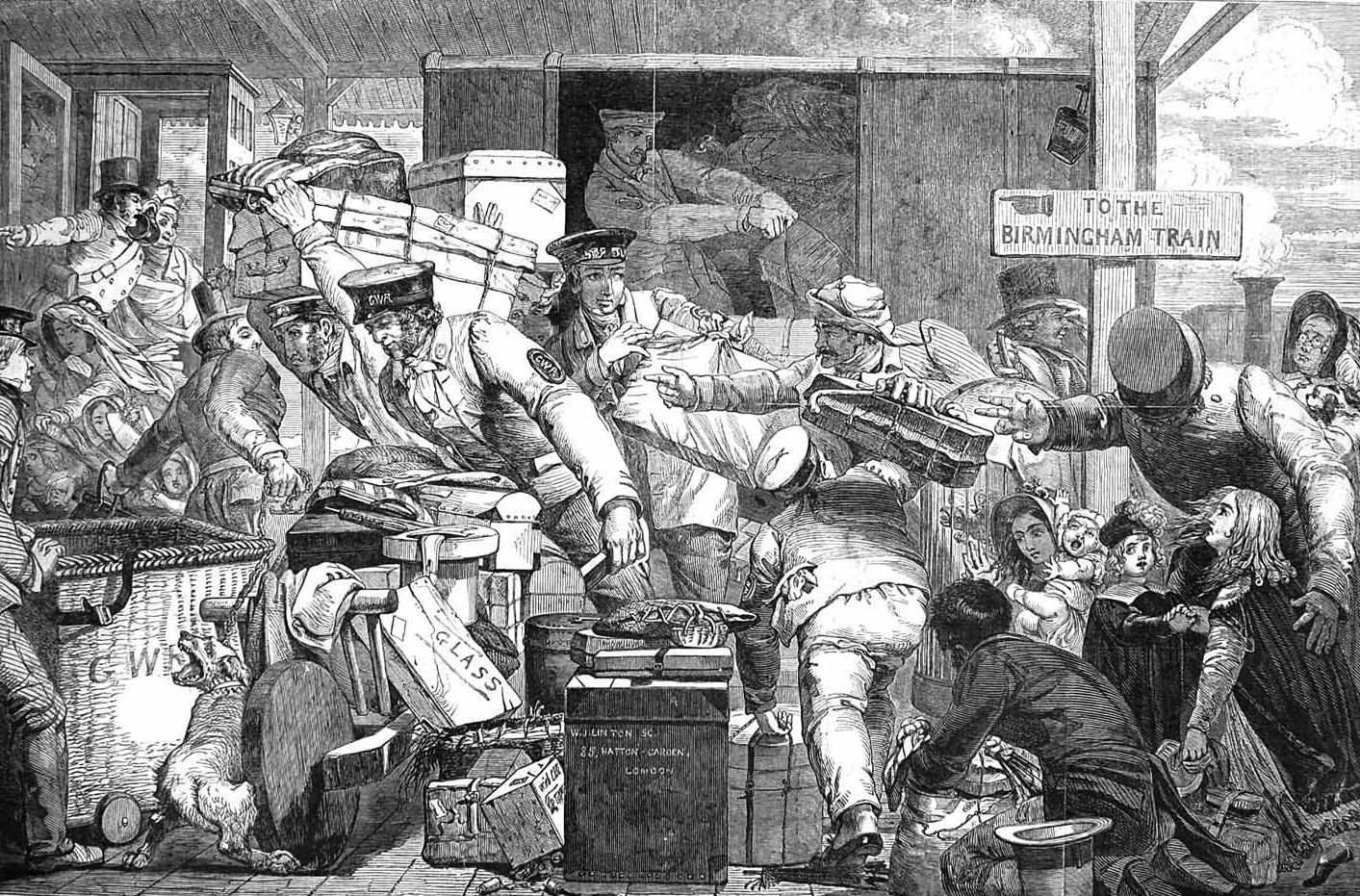
A cartoon depicting the "horrors of goods transfer" at the break of gauge at Gloucester in 1843

Where trains encounter a different gauge, such as at the borders between Spain and France or between Russia and China, the traditional solution has been transloading (often called transshipment in discussions of break of gauge), that is, the transfer of passengers and freight to cars on the other system. When transloading from one gauge to another, often the quantities of rolling stock are unbalanced between the two systems, leading to more idle rolling stock on one system than the other.

=== Bogie exchange and variable gauge ===
One common method to avoid transshipment is to build cars to the smaller of the two systems' loading gauges with bogies that are easily removed and replaced with other bogies at an interchange location on the border. This takes a few minutes per car, but is quicker than transshipment of goods.

A more modern and sophisticated method is to have multigauge bogies with wheelsets whose wheels can be moved inwards and outwards. Normally they are locked in place, but special equipment at the border unloads and unlocks the wheels and pushes them inward or outward to the new gauge, relocking and reloading the wheels when done. This is done as the train moves slowly over the special equipment. Stadler Rail make one brand of Variable Gauge Axle (VGA) system.

=== Dual gauge and track gauge conversion ===
In some cases, breaks of gauge are avoided by installing dual-gauge track, either permanently or as part of a changeover process to a single gauge.

=== Piggyback operation ===
One method of achieving interoperability between rolling stock of different gauges is to piggyback stock of one gauge on special transporter wagons or even ordinary flat wagons fitted with rails. This enables rolling stock to reach workshops and other lines of the same gauge to which they are not otherwise connected. Piggyback operation by the trainload occurred as a temporary measure between Port Augusta and Marree during gauge conversion work in the 1950s to bypass steep gradients and washaways in the Flinders Ranges.

Narrow-gauge railways were favoured in the underground slate quarries of North Wales, as tunnels could be smaller. The Padarn Railway operated transporter wagons on their 4 ft (1,219 mm) gauge railway, each carrying four 1 ft 10 3/4 in (578 mm) slate trams. When the Great Western Railway acquired one of the narrow-gauge lines in Blaenau Ffestiniog, it deployed a similar type of transporter wagon to allow continued use of the quarries' existing slate wagons.

Transporter wagons are most commonly used to transport narrow-gauge stock along standard-gauge lines. Sometimes whole trains of one gauge are loaded onto rails mounted on wagons of the other gauge. This occurred between Port Pirie and Maree for a short while in the 1950s.

At the Guinness brewery in Dublin there used to be 1 ft 10 in (559 mm) internal narrow gauge and 5 ft 3 in (1,600 mm) gauge (standard gauge for Ireland), and to avoid the need for steam locomotives of both gauges the narrow-gauge engines were provided with standard-gauge converter wagons (named "haulage trucks"). The narrow-gauge steam locomotive was lowered into the haulage truck using a gantry, and its wheels rested on rollers, which in turn drove the haulage wagon wheels via a 3:1 reduction gear. Several of these locomotives survived into preservation, including locomotive No23 complete with haulage wagon and lifting gantry preserved at Brockham museum in 1966, and now at the Amberley Museum Railway.

More rarely, standard-gauge vehicles are carried over narrow-gauge tracks using adaptor vehicles; examples include the Rollbocke transporter wagon arrangements in Germany, Austria, and the Czech Republic, and the milk transporter wagons of the Leek and Manifold Valley Light Railway in England.

As of 2010, Japan is developing the Train on Train piggyback concept, though this project has been abandoned by 2020.

=== Containerisation ===
The internationally widespread use of standard intermodal containers since the 1960s has made break of gauge less of a problem, since containers can be efficiently transferred from one mode or train to another by specialized cranes.

Greater efficiency is achieved when the lengths of the wagons on each gauge are the same, so that the containers can be transferred from one train to the other with no longitudinal movement. The speed of the transfer depends, among other factors, on how many cranes can operate simultaneously at the transfer location.

Container cranes are relatively portable, so that if the break of gauge transshipment hub changes from time to time, the cranes can be moved around as required. Fork lift trucks can also be used.

For example, when containers are shipped by a "direct train" from China to Europe, it is only containers, and not the railcars, which move from China's railway network to that of Kazakhstan. At the Altynkol railway station near the border at Khorgos, two trains (the Chinese 1,435 mm or 4 ft 8 1/2 in standard gauge one and the Kazakh 1,520 mm or 4 ft 11 27/32 in one) are placed side by side at parallel tracks, while gantry cranes move the containers from one train to the other in as short a time as 47 minutes.

== Types ==
=== Minor breaks of gauge ===
Wherever there are narrow-gauge lines that connect with a standard-gauge line, there is technically a break of gauge. If the amount of traffic transferred between lines is small, this might be a small inconvenience only. In Austria and Switzerland there are numerous breaks-of-gauge between standard-gauge main lines and narrow-gauge railways.

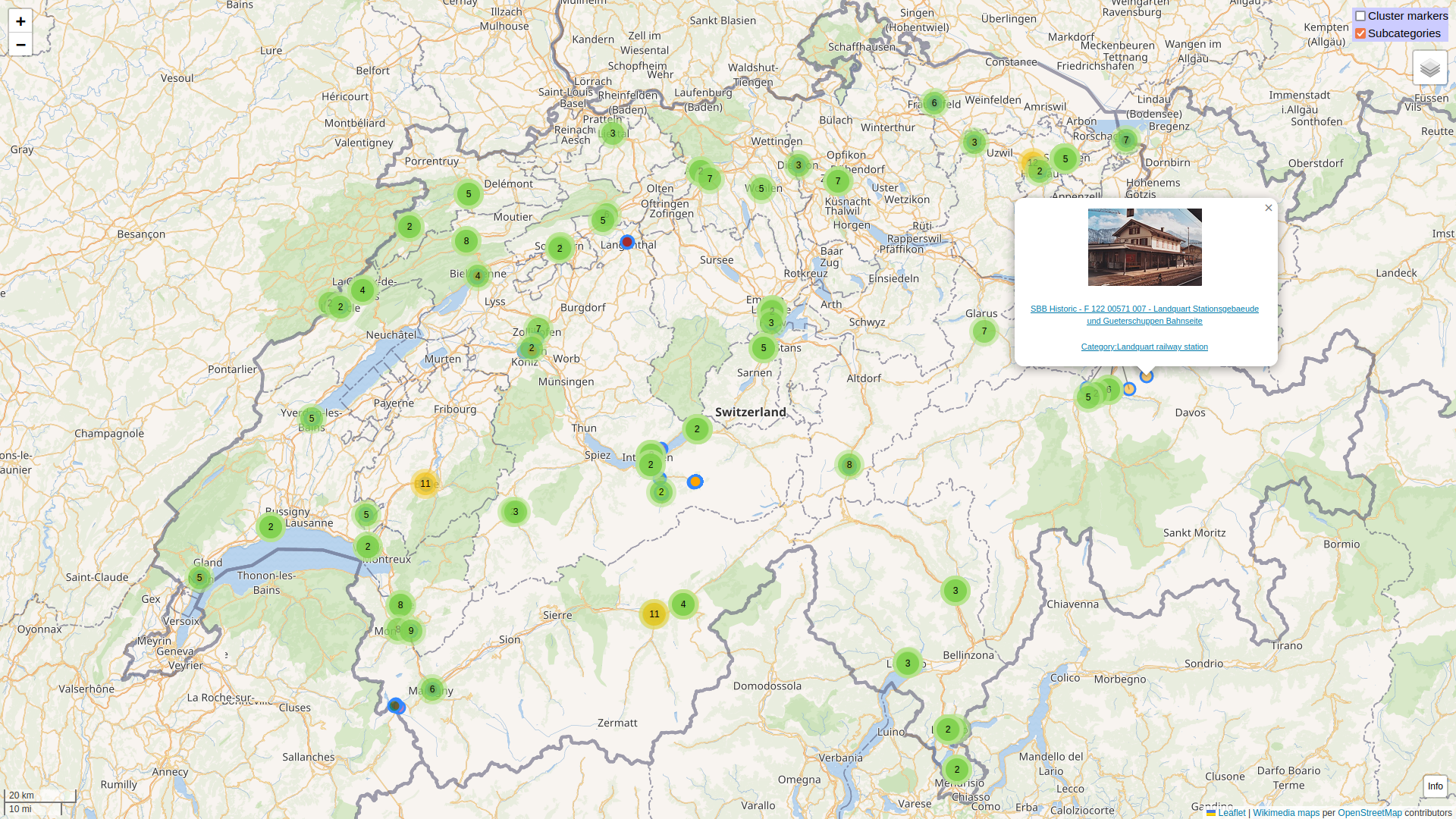
Stations in Switzerland with two different track gauges, 2022 (map based on Wikimedia Commons image locations)

Many internal Swiss railways that operate in the more mountainous regions are 1,000 mm (3 ft 3 3/8 in) metre gauge, and most are equipped with rack assistance to deal with the relatively steep gradients encountered. Through running of standard-gauge trains on rack sections would not be possible, but dual-gauge track exists in many places where the gradient is relatively flat to carry standard- and metre-gauge stock. There are also some 800-mm-gauge railways which are entirely rack operated.

The effects of a minor break of gauge can be minimized by placing it at the point where a cargo must be removed from cars anyway. An example of this is the East Broad Top Railroad in the US, which had a coal wash and preparation plant at its break of gauge in Mount Union, Pennsylvania. The coal was unloaded from narrow-gauge cars of the EBTR, and after processing was loaded into standard-gauge cars of the Pennsylvania Railroad.

=== Nominal breaks of gauge ===
The line between Finland and Russia has a nominal break of gauge; Finnish gauge is 1,524 mm (5 ft) whereas Russian gauge is 1,520 mm (4 ft 11 27/32 in); the present Russian gauge is actually a redefinition of the older 1,524 mm (5 ft). This does not usually prevent through-running – service running across both gauges existed in the form of the Allegro high-speed service between Helsinki and St. Petersburg until 2022. The nominal 4 mm (0.16 in) difference is generally within operating tolerances and does not cause problems or delays.

The Iberian gauge is actually three slightly different gauges: 1,672 mm (5 ft 5 13/16 in) in Spain, 1,664 mm (5 ft 5 1/2 in) in Portugal, and the newer, redefined 1,668 mm (5 ft 5 21/32 in). Through-running is done with vehicles having a gauge within certain tolerances. Indian gauge, 1,676 mm (5 ft 6 in), is also compatible with Iberian gauge, although there are no actual railway connections between the two. Despite this, old Spanish and Portuguese rolling stock have been reused in Argentina and Chile, both of which use Indian gauge.

A nominal break of gauge with standard gauge exists as well: on the Hong Kong MTR network, lines owned by MTR Corporation used 1,432 mm (4 ft 8 3/8 in) before 2014. Newer lines and extensions use 1,435 mm (4 ft 8 1/2 in) with nominal gauge break at Sheung Wan station and Yau Ma Tei station. 1,435 mm (4 ft 8 1/2 in) is also employed on those owned by KCR Corporation, despite the lack of physical connections between the two networks.

=== Other types of breaks ===
A large railway may have main lines with heavy tracks, and branch lines with light track. Light locomotives and rolling stock can operate on all lines, but heavy locomotives and rolling stock can only operate on heavy track. Heavy rolling stock might be able to operate on lighter track at reduced speed. Light track can be upgraded to heavy track by installing heavy rails, etc., and this can be done without changing the track gauge.

== Gauge conversions ==
=== Gauge orphan ===
When a main line is converted to a different gauge, branch lines can be cut off and made relatively useless, at least for freight trains, until they too are converted to the new gauge. These severed branches can be called gauge orphans.

=== Gauge outreach ===
The opposite of a gauge orphan is a line of one gauge which reaches into the territory composed mainly of another gauge. Examples include five 1,600 mm (5 ft 3 in) broad-gauge lines from Victoria, Australia, which crossed the border into otherwise standard-gauge New South Wales. Similarly, the standard-gauge line from Albury to Melbourne in 1962 which eliminated most transshipment at Albury, especially the need for passengers to change trains in the middle of the night. The standard-gauge outreach from Kalgoorlie to Perth partly replaced the original 3 ft 6 in (1,067 mm) narrow-gauge line, and partly rebuilt that line with better curves and gradients as double-track dual gauge. Because of lack of space at the main Perth station, standard-gauge passenger trains terminate three stations short at East Perth.

Three Russian broad-gauge lines reach out from Ukraine, one (the Uzhhorod–Košice line) into Slovakia to carry minerals; another (the Metallurgy Line) into Poland to carry heavy iron ore and steel products without the need for transshipment as would be the case if there were a break of gauge at the border. There were plans to extend the Slovak line to Vienna but these have been effectively killed by the Austrian government in 2021. The third one, from Polish-Ukrainian border to Przemyśl, is used for passenger connections to Lviv and Kiyv.

In 1994, the Rail Baltica proposal emerged to build a 728 km (452 mi) north–south standard-gauge line to link European railways from Poland via Kaunas, Lithuania, and Riga, Latvia, to Tallinn, Estonia. The first stage, connecting Lithuanian-Polish border to Kaunas, was completed in 2015.

A standard-gauge line, extending from Belarusian-Polish border to Hrodna, is used for passenger connections to Białystok, Warsaw and Kraków. A standard-gauge line from Polish-Ukrainian border to Lviv is planned.

== Other issues ==
While track gauge is the most important factor preventing through running between adjacent systems, other issues can also be a hindrance, including structure gauge, loading gauge, axleloads, couplings, brakes, electrification systems, signalling systems, multiple unit controls, rules and regulations, driver certification, righthand or lefthand running, repairs (how to make and pay for repairs while rolling stock is on other railway's territory) and language. The structure gauge, loading gauge and axleload problems are solved by simply using the smaller options for through running. The general solution is often to custom-build vehicles to fit all the standards to be encountered. Trains can be built to accept four voltages, to have dual signaling systems equipment, etc. All of these solutions, however, usually result in either more expensive trains or less comfort for passengers (e.g. through less room inside the train if it has a smaller loading gauge) or – in the case of freight railways – less room for cargo, making double stacking impossible or other negative effects.

== Examples ==
=== Europe ===
==== United Kingdom ====
- Gloucester was the earliest significant break of gauge between the 1,435 mm (4 ft 8 1/2 in) and 7 ft 1/4 in (2,140 mm) systems.
- 1864 – Yeovil

==== 5 foot and Russian gauge meeting standard gauge ====
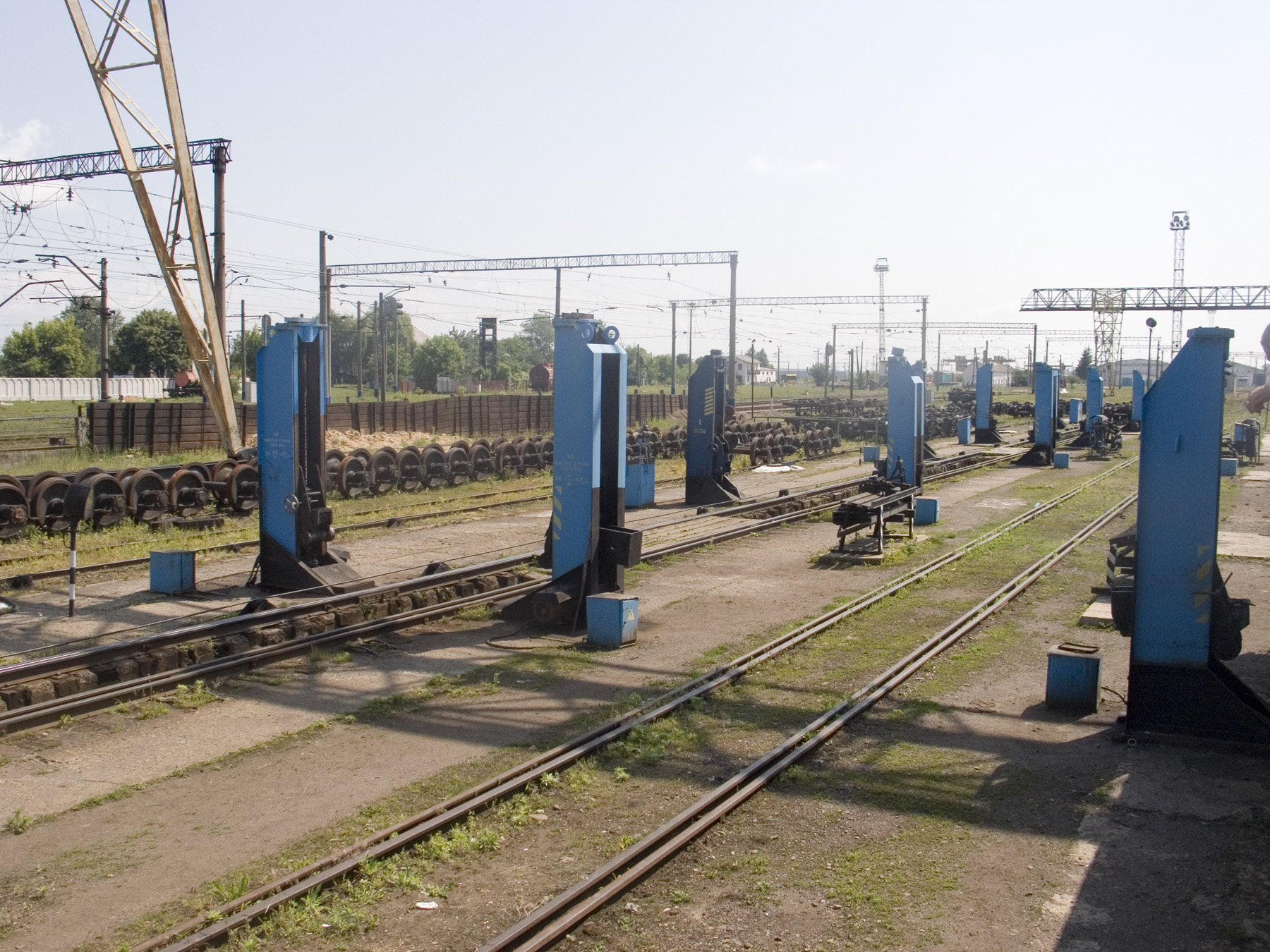
Bogie-exchange station in Ukraine

- Poland, Slovakia, Hungary and Romania (1,435 mm (4 ft 8 1/2 in)).

versus Former Soviet Union countries: Russia, Lithuania, Belarus, Ukraine, Moldova (1,520 mm (4 ft 11 27/32 in)). Night trains are common, and they are often bogie-exchanged.

- Finland (1,524 mm (5 ft)) and Sweden (1,435 mm (4 ft 8 1/2 in)), between Tornio and Haparanda via a short dual gauge bridge. Freight is generally transloaded. No passenger trains. There is also a SeaRail train ferry (with 1,435 mm (4 ft 8 1/2 in) on board) linking Turku, Finland with Stockholm, Sweden; the Turku terminal handles both gauges.
- Bulgaria (1,435 mm (4 ft 8 1/2 in)) railroad ferries to Ukraine, Russia and Georgia (1,520 mm (4 ft 11 27/32 in))
- Germany (1,435 mm (4 ft 8 1/2 in)) railroad ferries (from Sassnitz with 1,520 mm (4 ft 11 27/32 in) on board) to Russia and Baltic States and to Finland (also from Travemünde with 1,435 mm (4 ft 8 1/2 in) on board).
- Turkey and Iran versus Georgia, Armenia, Azerbaijan, Turkmenistan
- While breaks of gauge are generally located near borders, the Uzhhorod – Košice line carrying iron ore from Ukraine extends into Slovak territory to a steelworks near Košice and there are plans to extend the line further west, to Vienna. See also Rail gauge in Slovakia.
- The historically first break of gauge between Russian and standard gauge was built in 1861 as dual gauge between the border stations of Eydtkuhnen, East Prussia and part of the German Empire (now Chernyshevskoye, Kaliningrad Oblast, Russia), and Kybartai, then Russia, now Lithuania.
- The "1520 Strategic Partnership" was established to harmonise the gauges of Europe and Asia.

==== Iberian gauge meeting standard gauge ====
- France (1,435 mm or 4 ft 8 1/2 in) and Spain (1,668 mm or 5 ft 5 21/32 in), for example at Cerbère (FR) – Portbou (ES); Hendaye (FR) – Irun (ES) and Latour-de-Carol (FR) (Note: At Latour-de-Carol-Enveitg station three lines meet, each with a different gauge: Iberian gauge to Puigcerdà, Barcelona and L'Hospitalet de Llobregat, standard gauge with regional trains to Toulouse and night trains to Paris, and metre gauge on the Ligne de Cerdagne line to Villefranche-de-Conflent.) – Puigcerdà (ES). From 2010 the Spanish high-speed network (1,435 mm or 4 ft 8 1/2 in) was connected to the French railways without a break of gauge.

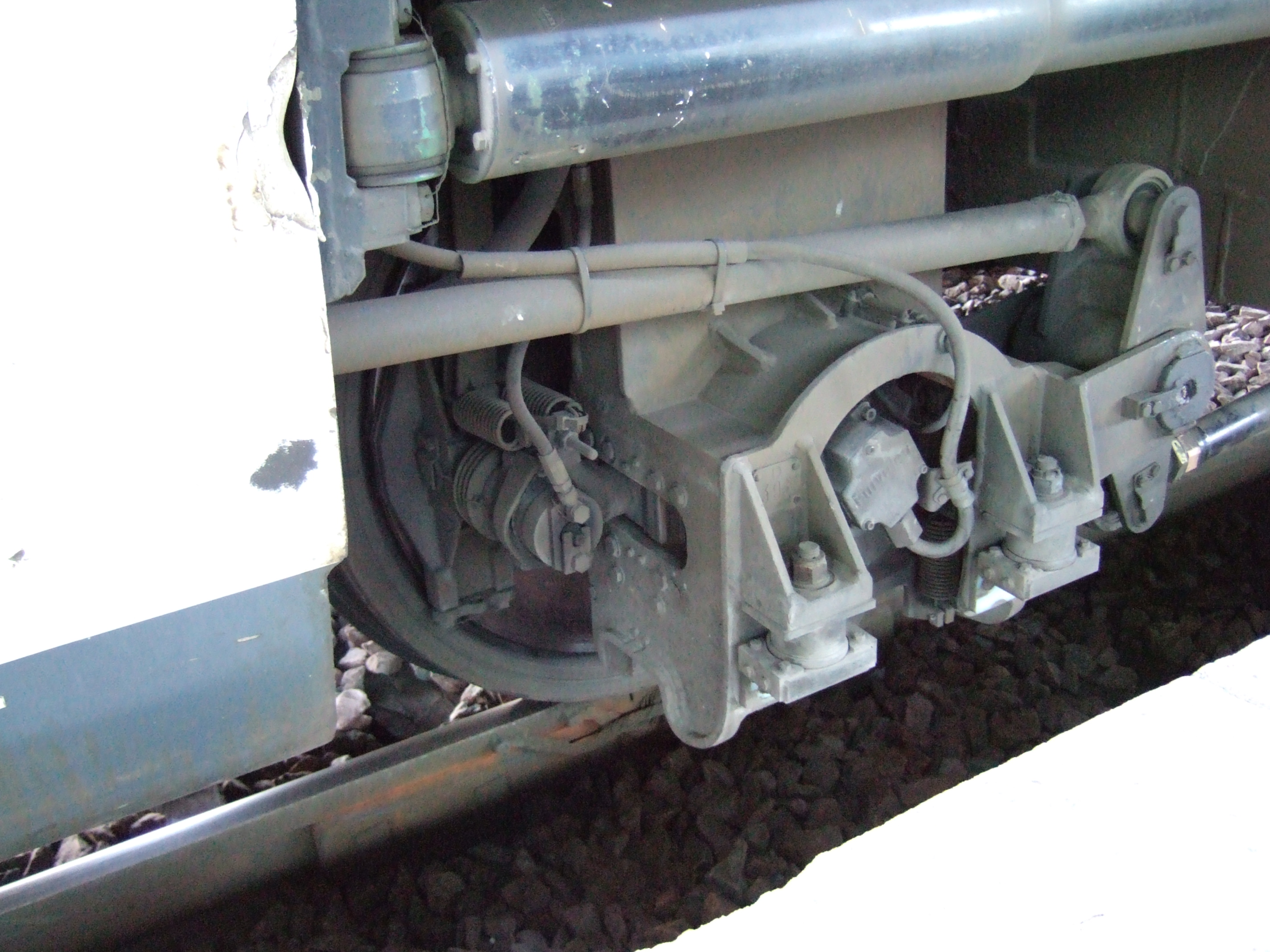
Variable gauge axles on a Spanish train designed for intercity travel to France

The earliest working example of the axle-changing system at the French-Spain border in 1948 had the axles being changed at the rate of 8 wagons or 32 axles per hour.

==== Local narrow-gauge lines meeting mainlines ====
- Switzerland, see "Minor breaks of gauge" section above.
- The Harzer Schmalspurbahn took over a standard-gauge line from Deutsche Bahn when the latter had no more use for it and regauged it to meter gauge to prevent the problems of break of gauge. Nonetheless, a break of gauge (and a change of train operator) still occurs at the point where that line connects to the rest of the DB network. DB itself has no break of gauge problems as the only non-standard-gauge railway it operates is on the island of Wangerooge without any train connection to the mainland.

=== North America ===
The United States of America had broad-, narrow-, and standard-gauge tracks in the 19th century, but is now almost entirely 1,435 mm (4 ft 8 1/2 in) standard gauge. Narrow-gauge operations are generally confined to isolated rail systems, with a few notable exceptions.

- A break of gauge, 3 ft (914 mm) to 4 ft 8 1/2 in (1,435 mm), between Guatemala and Mexico is currently closed.
- (United States) In Antonito, Colorado, there was a break between the standard-gauge Rio Grande Scenic Railroad and the narrow-gauge Cumbres and Toltec Scenic Railroad, billed as the Toltec Gorge Limited. The former Rio Grande Scenic Railroad operates now as the freight-only Colorado Pacific Rio Grande Railroad, which still has track to Antonito but no interaction with the Cumbres & Toltec.
- (United States) BART in the San Francisco Bay Area has a cross-platform interchange between the electrified 1,676 mm (5 ft 6 in) broad-gauge Yellow Line and non-electrified standard gauge eBART at a transfer platform east of Pittsburg/Bay Point station. The eBART system is designed to allow the new trackage to be electrified and regauged for BART mainline trains at a later date.
- (United States) 69th Street Transportation Center in Upper Darby Township, Pennsylvania is a break of gauge between the 5 ft 2 1/2 in (1,588 mm) Market–Frankford Line and Media–Sharon Hill Line, and the standard gauge Norristown High Speed Line.

=== South America ===
- Argentina and Chile both use 1,676 mm (5 ft 6 in) broad-gauge tracks, but the link railway uses 1,000 mm (3 ft 3 3/8 in) narrow gauge with rack railway sections. There are two break-of-gauge stations, one at Los Andes, Chile, and the other at Mendoza, Argentina.
- In 2022, Brazil has 22,539 km of lines in 1,000 mm (3 ft 3 3/8 in) metre-gauge; 7,432 km in 1,600 mm (5 ft 3 in) broad-gauge and 514 km in mixed gauge of both 1,000 mm and 1,600 mm.
- A break of gauge exists between Argentina and Brazil, 1,435 mm (4 ft 8 1/2 in) to 1,000 mm (3 ft 3 3/8 in).
- A break of gauge exists between Uruguay and Brazil, 1,435 mm (4 ft 8 1/2 in) to 1,000 mm (3 ft 3 3/8 in) at Santana do Livramento.

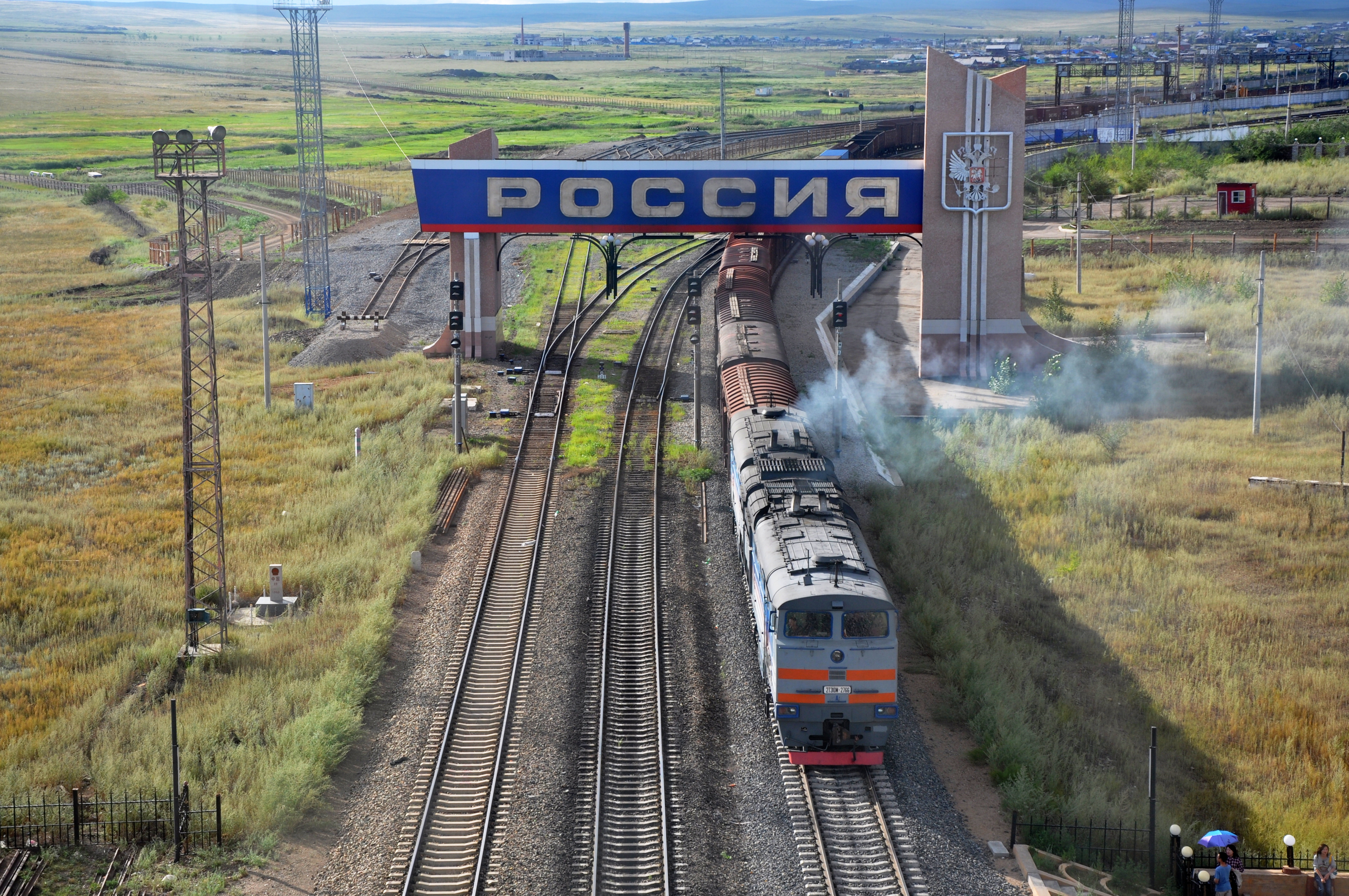
A train on 1435 mm standard-gauge track leaving Russia. It is bound for Manzhouli, China, having replaced its 1520 mm-gauge bogies with standard-gauge bogies at the bogie exchange yard in the distance.

- Bi-oceanic railway connecting Peru via Bolivia to Brazil has break of gauge issues:

Heavy rails are needed for heavy traffic,
South America uses these gauges: 914mm, 1000mm, 1067mm, 1435mm, 1600mm and 1676mm.
Peru (1435mm)
Bolivia (1000mm)
-
Brazil (1000mm and 1600mm)
Heavy duty locomotives are needed:

1435mm, 1600mm, 1676mm gauge - Co-Co looomotive have enough space between the wheels for traction motors;
1000mm gauge - Bo-Bo-Bo-Bo locomotives have insufficient space between the wheels;
In 2026 Chancay Port needs access from six gauges, namely 914mm, 1000mm, 1067mm, 1435mm, 1600mm, 1676mm and Highway access.

=== Asia ===
==== China ====
China has a standard-gauge network; neighbouring countries Mongolia, Russia and Kazakhstan use 1,520 mm (4 ft 11 27/32 in) gauge, and Vietnam mostly uses 1,000 mm (3 ft 3 3/8 in) (metre gauge), so there are some breaks of gauge. See the Trans-Manchurian Railway (gauge changing at Zabaikalsk on the Russian side of the border), the Trans-Mongolian Railway and the Lanxin railway. The Yunnan–Vietnam Railway is narrow gauge, and is connected to standard-gauge tracks both in Kunming and in Hekou. The Nanning-Hanoi line is dual gauge in Vietnam as far as Hanoi. There is currently a break of gauge at Dostyk on the Kazakh border. Kazakhstan was planning to build an additional line using standard gauge, between Dostyk and Aktogay but the scheme was abandoned.

==== Iran ====
Iran, with its standard-gauge rail system, has a break of gauge with 1,520 mm (4 ft 11 27/32 in) gauge at the borders with Azerbaijan and Turkmenistan, and also with Pakistan's 5 ft 6 in gauge railway at Zahedan. The break-of-gauge station at Zahedan was built outside the city, as the existing station was hemmed in by built-up areas.

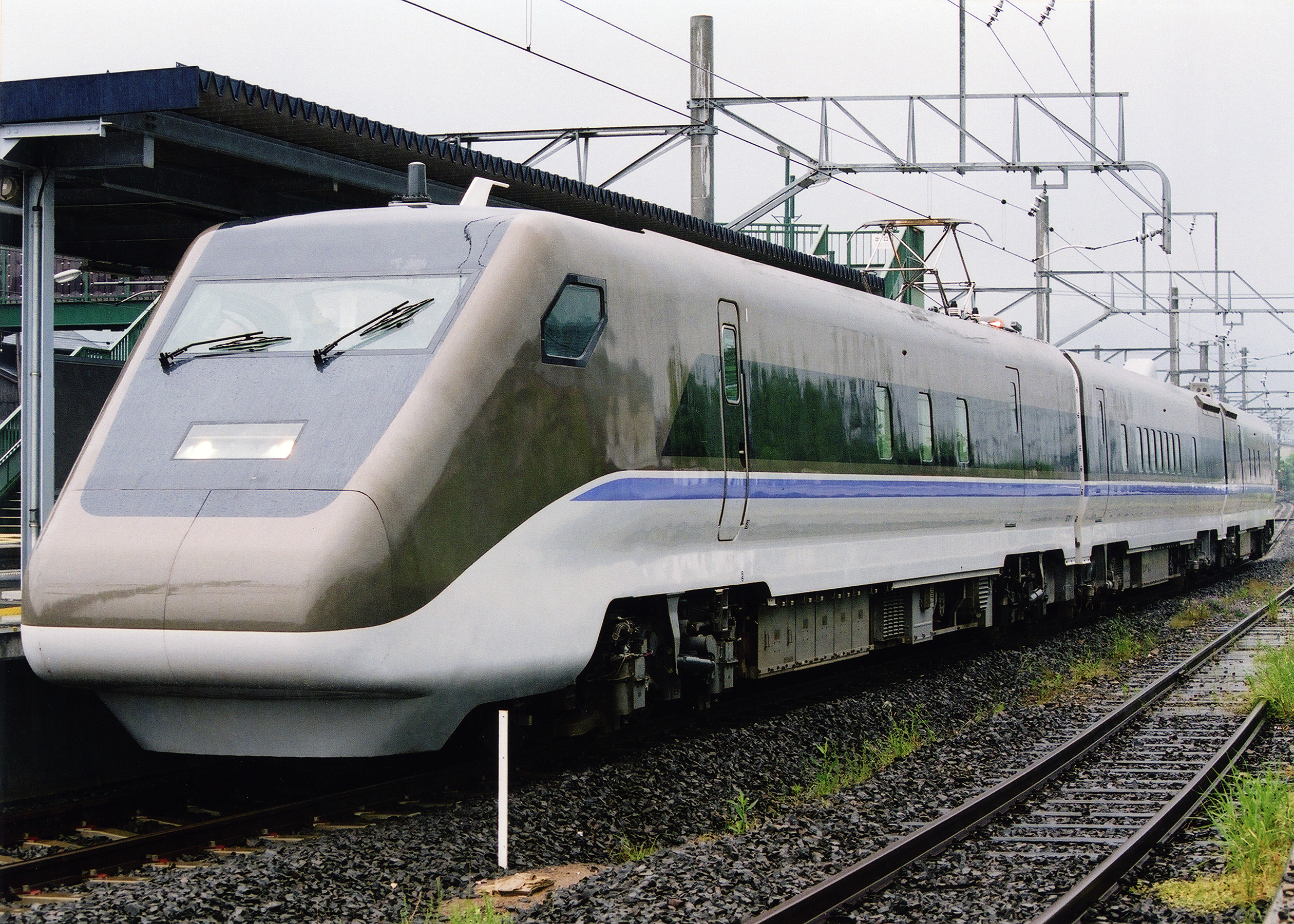
The first-generation, experimental Gauge Change Train as seen in 2003

==== Japan ====
All high-speed "Shinkansen" routes in Japan have been built as standard-gauge lines. A few routes, known as "Super Tokkyū", have been planned as narrow-gauge 3 ft 6 in (1,067 mm), and the conventional (non-high-speed) is mostly narrow-gauge 3 ft 6 in (1,067 mm), so there are some breaks of gauge and dual gauge is used in some places. Private railways often use other gauges.

While most of the Japanese urban rail/metro lines use 1,067 mm (3 ft 6 in) rail gauge, a considerable number of lines (including all lines of the Osaka Metro) are still using their own different gauges including 762 mm (2 ft 6 in), 1,372 mm (4 ft 6 in), and 1,435 mm (4 ft 8 1/2 in).

In 2010, Hokkaido Railway Company (JR Hokkaido) started working on a transporter train by trainload concept called "Train on Train" to carry narrow-gauge freight trains at faster speeds on standard-gauge flatcars. The Seikan Tunnel has been converted by JR Hokkaido to dual gauge to accommodate the Hokkaido Shinkansen.

An experimental program for a variable gauge "Gauge Change Train" started in 1998 as a means to allow through services from high-speed standard-gauge Shinkansen lines to narrow-gauge regional lines. Its first deployment was expected to be the Kyushu Shinkansen Nagasaki route. However, the program was cancelled in 2008.

==== North Korea ====
The North Korean rail system has some breaks of gauge. Several parts of the Paektusan Ch'ŏngnyŏn Line on the stretch between Wiyŏn and Hyesan Ch'ŏngnyŏn are dual gauged to allow connections to the Paektusan Rimch'ŏl Line and the Samjiyŏn Line. Also, the line connecting to the Trans-Siberian Railway from Rason to Tumangang and the Korea-Russia Friendship Bridge is dual gauged for standard gauge and Russian gauge. Originally the dual gauge may have reached as far as Khasan, but as of 2021 the standard gauge track has been taken up on the Russian side of the bridge.

==== Sakhalin ====
In the 20th century, railroads on the entire Sakhalin used the same 3 ft 6 in (1,067 mm) narrow gauge as Japan, as part of it was under Japan's control when railway construction began. One stretch of rail that used 600 mm (1 ft 11 5/8 in) narrow gauge was converted to match the 3 ft 6 in (1,067 mm) narrow gauge after Russia took control of it.

Starting from the 1970s, a train ferry service was provided to connect Sakhalin and the Russia mainland, requiring bogie exchange on wagons to allow operation on the Russian mainland 1,520 mm (4 ft 11 27/32 in) broad gauge.

In 2003, the Russian government started to convert the entire network to dual gauge with 3 ft 6 in (1,067 mm) and 1,520 mm (4 ft 11 27/32 in). Work is 70% done as of 2016, and is expected to be complete by 2018. The entire island's rolling stock is expected to be replaced by 1,520 mm (4 ft 11 27/32 in) rolling stock by 2020, thus eliminating the break of gauge between Sakhalin and the Russian mainland.

==== Taiwan ====
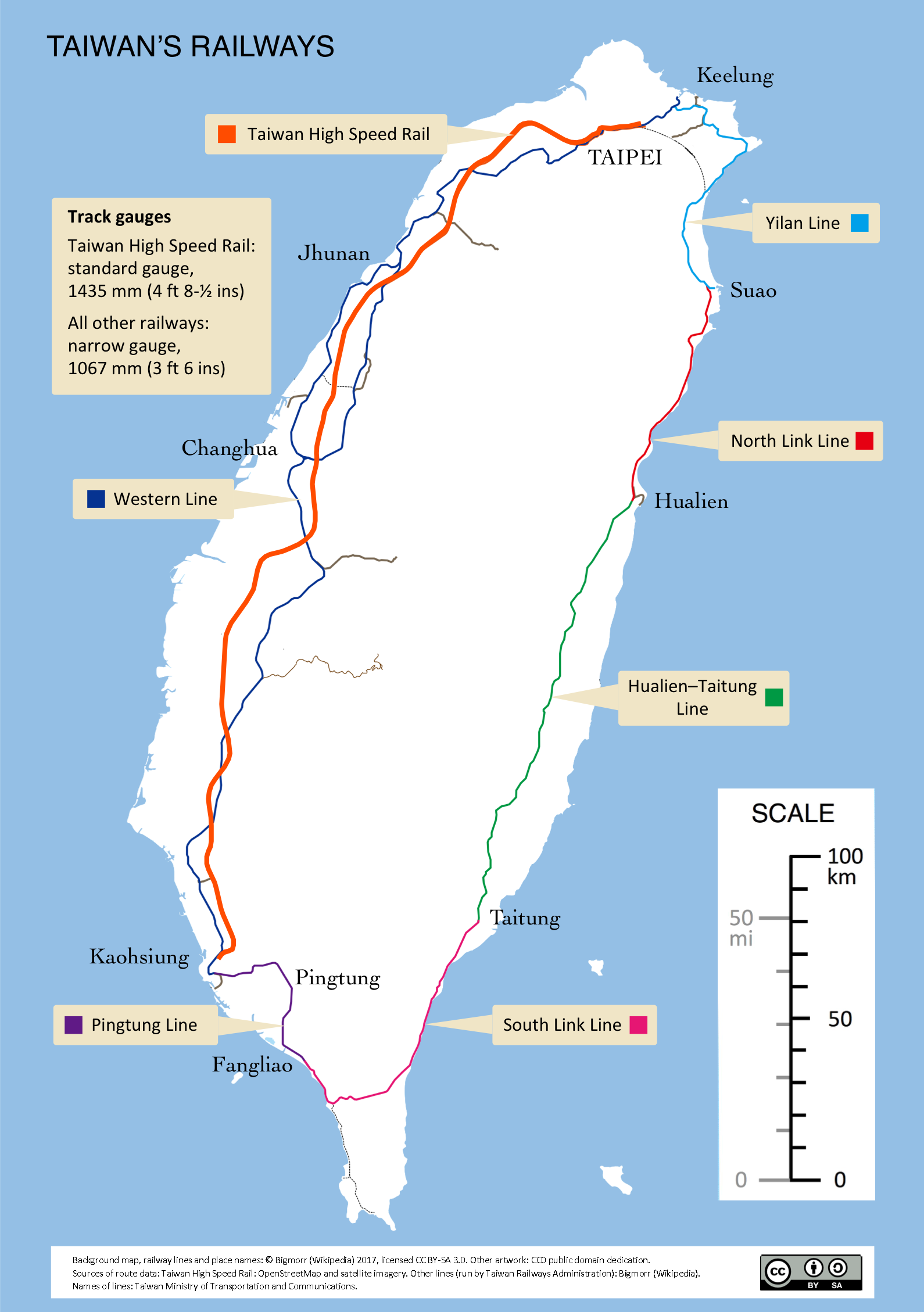
Taiwan's railways consist of 345 km (214 mi) of high-speed line (shown in orange) and 1,100 km (680 mi) of others. As in other countries, the high-speed line mainly conveys passengers and time-sensitive parcels, so very little transfer occurs between the two systems.

Like Japan, rail transport in Taiwan uses the 3 ft 6 in (1,067 mm) gauge for the majority of its railway network, but 1,435 mm (4 ft 8 1/2 in) standard gauge for its high-speed rail; however, gauge differences are less of a problem as Taiwan High Speed Rail generally uses separate rolling stock and its own separate railway, and at most locations runs on routes kilometres away from the conventional Taiwan Railways Administration railway network.

=== Africa ===
- Rail lines linked by ferries on convenient rivers or lakes.
- Dar es Salaam is one of the few places in Africa where different gauges actually meet.
- Kidatu in Tanzania has a container transshipment facility to move freight containers between TAZARA 1,067 mm (3 ft 6 in) and Tanzania Railways Corporation trains 1,000 mm (3 ft 3 3/8 in)
- D. R. Congo originally had both 1,000 mm (3 ft 3 3/8 in) and 3 ft 6 in (1,067 mm) lines, but when these lines met in the 1950s, the 1,000 mm (3 ft 3 3/8 in) line was converted to 3 ft 6 in (1,067 mm).
- In the rest of Africa, railways of different gauges in adjacent countries often do not actually meet, so there is no actual break of gauge.

=== Australia ===
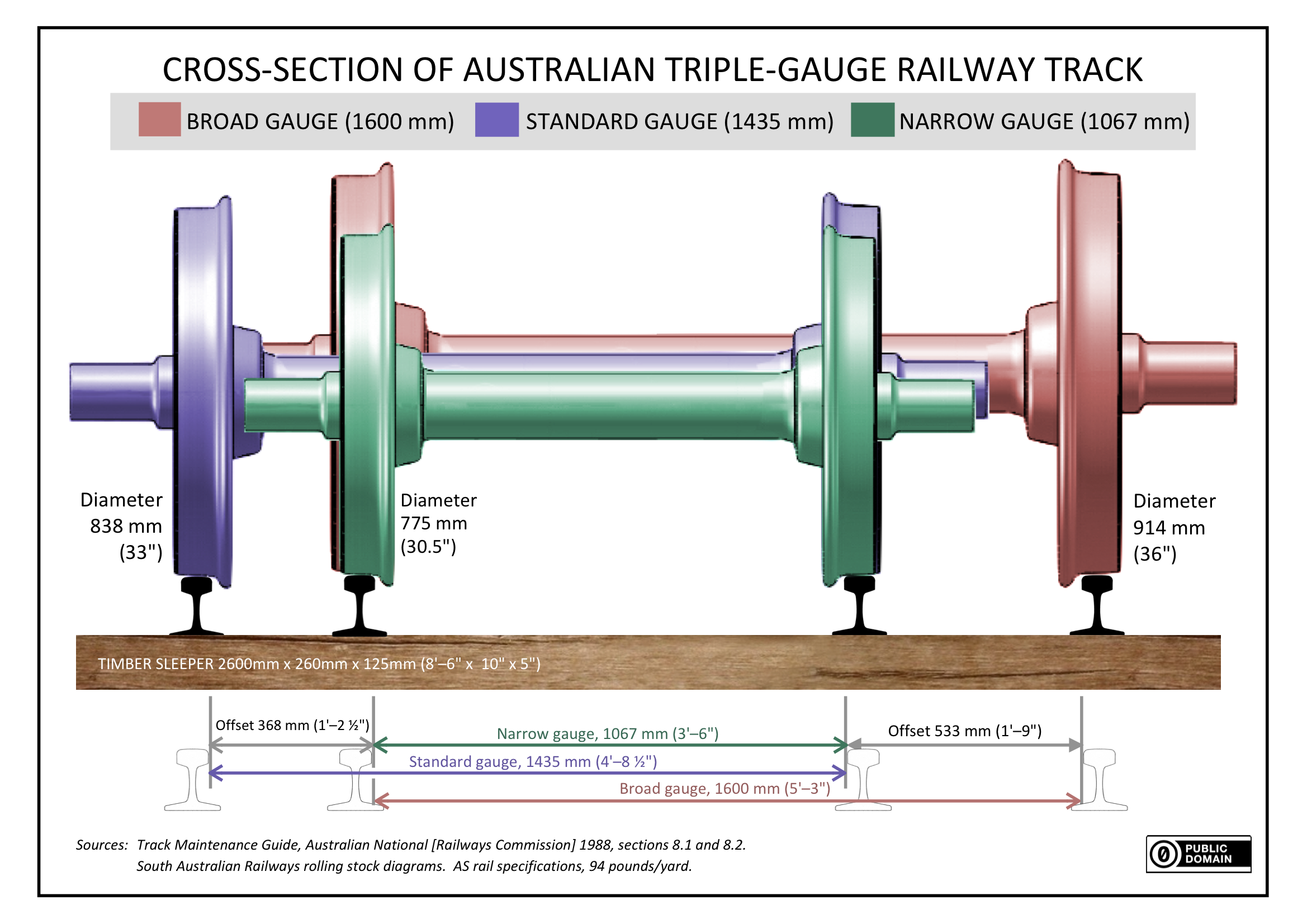
Placement of rails when it is necessary for track to be triple-gauge – in this case, 1,600 mm (5 ft 3 in), 1,435 mm (4 ft 8 1/2 in) and 1,067 mm (3 ft 6 in), as at Gladstone and Peterborough in South Australia

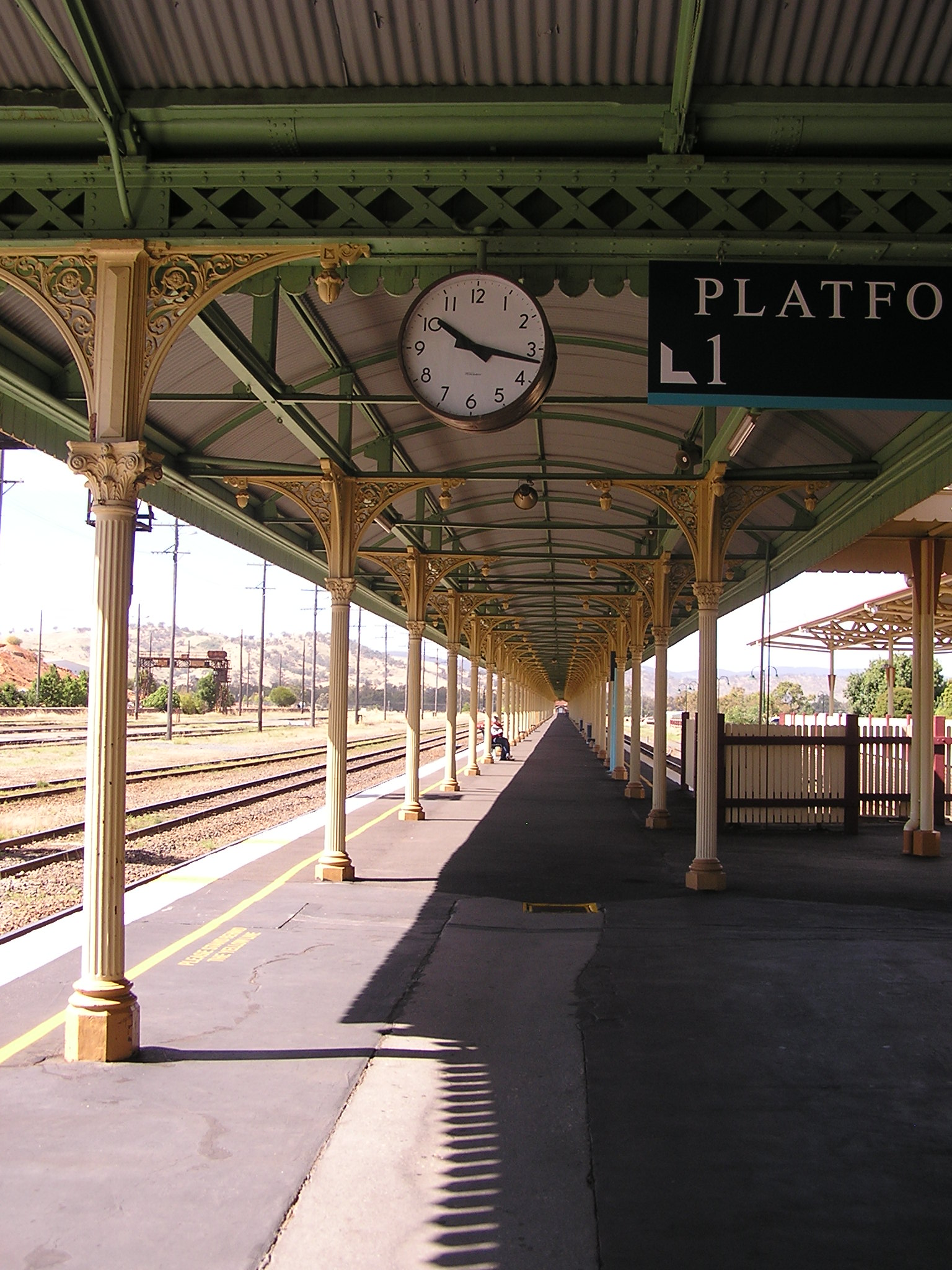
The former break-of-gauge platform for on the Sydney–Melbourne mainline at Albury station: standard gauge on the left; broad gauge on the right. It was here that Mark Twain changed trains in the middle of the night and formed his pungent view of "the paralysis of intellect that gave that idea birth".

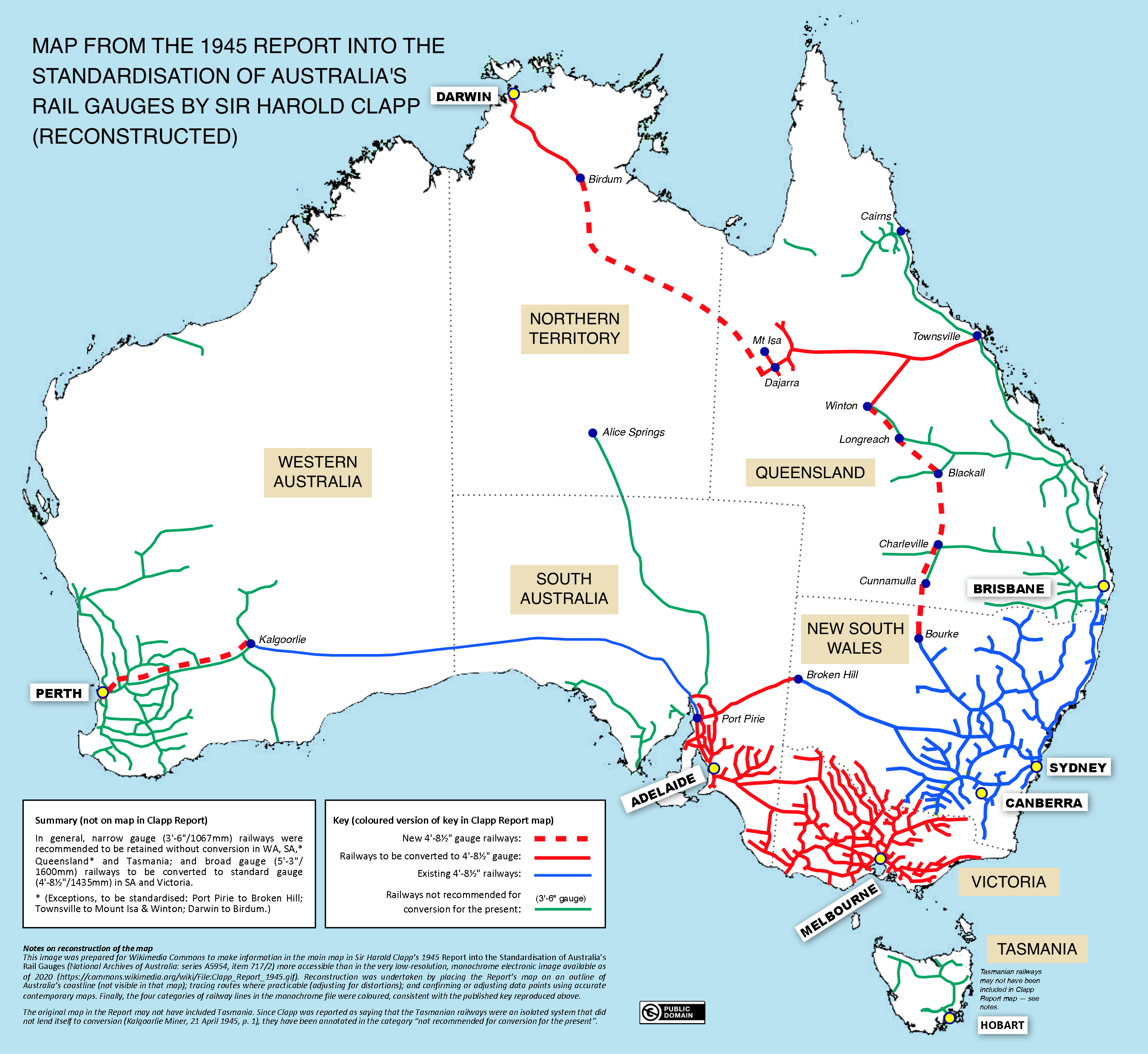
Harold Clapp's 1945 proposals for standardisation of Australia's three main railway gauges. Standardisation of the 4,352 km (2,704 mi) east–west route was achieved only in 1970; linking of all mainland capital cities in 1995; and completion of a 2,975 km (1,849 mi) north–south route in 2004. (Click to enlarge.)

==== Origins of Australia's multi-gauge muddle ====
In 1845, the South Australian newspaper mentioned the convening of a Royal Commission in Britain "inquiring whether, in future private acts of parliament for the construction of railways, provision ought to be made for securing a uniform gauge, and whether ... to bring the railways already constructed, or in progress ... into uniformity". It continued, "Since the colonists are now moving the question of railroads, we direct their special attention to the following. A uniform gauge will be of the utmost importance to the internal traffic of the province; (Note: That is, South Australia.) and the time to determine the proper and most convenient width of the rail, is at the commencement".

South Australia and New South Wales (Note: Victoria had not yet become a separate colony from New South Wales; the colonies would not federate until 1901.) then agreed to adopt the 4 ft 8 1/2 in (1,435 mm) gauge: South Australia in 1847 and New South Wales in 1848.

However, in 1850, New South Wales decided to change to 5 ft 3 in (1,600 mm), or Irish gauge. The change was approved by the British government, and South Australia agreed to follow suit. However, in 1853, New South Wales unilaterally reverted to the 4 ft 8 1/2 in (1,435 mm) gauge. South Australia and Victoria, the latter now separated from New South Wales, protested about the broken agreement, to no avail. Because they had already invested in broad-gauge track, locomotives and rolling stock, they continued construction.

There followed decades of nationally uncoordinated railway construction designed to serve the needs of the railways' parent colonies. They made their gauge choices in accordance with their perception of their own economic and geographical circumstances and to buttress, if not promote, their individual identities as colonies.

It was to be 90 years before a national investigation of standardisation of gauges was undertaken, in 1945. Progress after that was still very slow, largely confined to linking all mainland capital cities with standard-gauge lines – achieved only in 1982.

The American writer, Mark Twain, in 1879 summed up his experience of changing trains at Albury on a journey to Melbourne:

Now comes a singular thing: the oddest thing, the strangest thing, the most baffling and unaccountable marvel that Australasia can show. At the frontier between New South Wales and Victoria our multitude of passengers were routed out of their snug beds by lantern-light in the morning in the biting-cold of a high altitude to change cars on a road that has no break in it from Sydney to Melbourne! Think of the paralysis of intellect that gave that idea birth; imagine the boulder it emerged from on some petrified legislator's shoulders.

The greatest number of break-of-gauge stations was in South Australia. There, 5 ft 3 in (1,600 mm) and 3 ft 6 in (1,067 mm) lines met, both at the time of their introduction and – at different places – of their gradual transition to standardisation, first to broad gauge and then to standard gauge. At various times these stations were:

- Hamley Bridge
- Terowie
- Peterborough
- Gladstone
- three stations at various times at Port Pirie
- Port Augusta
- Marree
- Wolseley
- Mount Gambier.

==== Snapshot of Australian gauges, 2021 ====
In broad terms, (Note: Ignoring preserved railways and tramways, the most notable being Victoria's Puffing Billy Railway (762 mm (2 ft 6 in)) and South Australia's Pichi Richi Railway (1,067 mm (3 ft 6 in)) and SteamRanger (1,600 mm (5 ft 3 in)).) Australia's railway gauges were as follows in 2020:

State & primary gauge	Other gauge(s)	Notes
Queensland; 1,067 mm (3 ft 6 in)	1,435 mm (4 ft 8 1/2 in)	Brisbane to the New South Wales border
Queensland; 1,067 mm (3 ft 6 in)	610 mm (2 ft)	several thousand kilometres of lightweight trackage for transport of sugar cane
New South Wales; 1,435 mm (4 ft 8 1/2 in)	1,600 mm (5 ft 3 in)	the Deniliquin, Tocumwal, and the disused Moulamein lines, which run from Victoria into the state
Victoria; 1,600 mm (5 ft 3 in)	1,435 mm (4 ft 8 1/2 in)	from Melbourne to the New South Wales border and from Melbourne to the South Australia border, and branch lines to Yelta, Portland, Hopetoun, plus several others
South Australia	1,600 mm (5 ft 3 in)	in the Adelaide suburban area
South Australia	1,435 mm (4 ft 8 1/2 in)	lines to Western Australia, Victoria, New South Wales and the Northern Territory
South Australia	1,067 mm (3 ft 6 in)	one line carrying gypsum in the far west, and others carrying iron ore to Whyalla
Western Australia; 1,067 mm (3 ft 6 in)	1,435 mm (4 ft 8 1/2 in)	from Perth to the South Australian border and, branching from it at Kalgoorlie, south to Esperance and north to Leonora; heavy rail lines in the north (Pilbara) transporting iron ore to port
Tasmania; 1,067 mm (3 ft 6 in)	originally 1,600 mm (5 ft 3 in)	

=== New Zealand ===
New Zealand originally had small lengths of lines of 3 ft 6 in (1,067 mm), 4 ft 8 1/2 in (1,435 mm) and 5 ft 3 in (1,600 mm), but quickly converted all to 3 ft 6 in (1,067 mm), which better suited the sparsely populated and mountainous country.

== Bibliography ==
- Rolt, L. T. C. (1989) [1957]. Isambard Kingdom Brunel. Prentice Hall Press. ISBN 978-0-582-10744-1.
- Wilson, John (2024). Break-of-gauge, a social history. Sarlines Railway Books. ISBN 978-0-6456219-3-8.

== See also ==
- Erie Gauge War
- Eurasian Land Bridge
- Gauntlet track
- Janes World Railways has maps that generally show breaks-of-gauge.
- Piggyback (transportation)
- Ramsey car-transfer apparatus
- Track gauge conversion
- Variable gauge axles
  - INTERGAUGE a form of VGA
  - SUW 2000 a form of VGA
