= Voix de fait =

Studio album by Manu Militari
- Released: February 28, 2006
- Genre: Rap
- Length: 51:11
- Language: French
- Label: HLM (Canada); HLM2-2150 (CD)

Manu Militari chronology
Voix de fait (2006)	Crime d'honneur (2009)

Singles from Voix de fait
- 1. "Voix de fait" 2. "L'empreinte"; 3. "La traversée du lac Nasser"

Professional ratings
Review scores
Source	Rating
HHQC	4/5 stars
Voir	4/5 stars

Voix de fait is Manu Militari's debut album released on February 28, 2006. The album was a nominee for the Author or compositor of the year and Hip hop album of the year categories at the Félix Awards in 2006.

== Track listing ==
1. "Voix de fait"
2. "Quatre saisons"
3. "Le meilleur des mondes"
4. "L'empreinte" https://www.youtube.com/watch?v=w9P7LFWEAqY
5. "Ganstérisme" (featuring 4Say & Ott)
6. "L'an 40"
7. "Mon inspiration"
8. "La piaule"
9. "Au parloir"
10. "La traversée du lac Nasser"
11. "Marche funèbre"
12. "Conclusion" (featuring Rime Organisé)
13. "Bonus Track"
