= Manu Militari =

Canadian rapper

- Also known as: M-A-N-U
- Born: May 21, 1979 (age 46)
- Origin: Quebec, Quebec, Canada
- Genres: Rap, French Rap
- Years active: 2002-present
- Labels: HLM

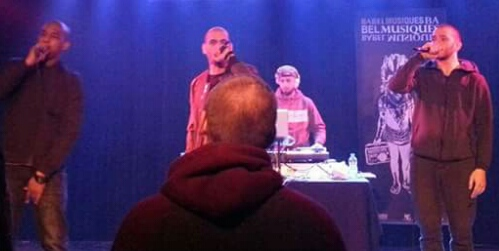
Manu Militari photographed in Montreal, Quebec, Canada at the Ahuntsic/Cartierville cultural centre.

Manu Militari (born May 21, 1979) is a francophone rapper from Quebec, Quebec, Canada. His stage name is taken from the Latin phrase meaning "By the force of arms".

After a tour that included India, Greece, and the Middle East, he released his first EP in 2002 entitled Manu Drastic. He also founded the group Rime Organisé with whom he released the EP Règlements de comptes. In 2006, he released his second solo album Voix de fait that was nominated for "Best Author Compositor" and "Best Hip Hop Album" in Canada's Félix Awards. His 2009 album, Crime d'honneur, sold around 8,000 copies.

His 2012 single and music video for "L'Attente" created controversy with allegations it showed attacks by Afghans on Canadian troops in Afghanistan, telling the story from an Afghan fighter's perspective. The protests alleged this was a glorification of the Taliban and pinpointed to the fact that Manu Militari had received $110,000 in four years from MusicAction, a government-funded body. Manu Military withdrew the music video in question on 29 June 2012, days after the controversy.

== Discography ==
=== Albums ===
- 2006: Voix de fait
- 2009: Crime d'honneur (release date, December 1, 2009)
- 2012: Marée Humaine (release date September 11, 2012)
- 2015: Ocean (release date November 20, 2015)
- 2021: Nouvelle Vague (release date December 3, 2021)

=== EPs ===
- 2002: Manu Drastic (EP)

as Rime Organisé

- 2004: Règlements de comptes (EP)

== See also ==
- Rime Organisé
