= Crime d'honneur =

2009 album by Québécois rapper Manu Militari

Studio album by Manu Militari
- Released: December 1, 2009
- Genre: Rap
- Length: 53:48
- Language: French
- Labels: HLM; HOTBOX Productions
- Producer: Manu Militari

Manu Militari chronology
Voix de fait (2006)	Crime d'honneur (2009)	Marée Humaine (2012)

Singles from Crime d'honneur
- 1. ""Le Premier""

Professional ratings
Review scores
Source	Rating
Sputnikmusic	4.1/5 stars

Crime d'honneur is the second album of Québécois rapper Manu Militari and was released on December 1, 2009. The album won the Félix Award in 2010.

== Track listing ==
No.	Title	Length
1.	"Crime d'Honneur" (featuring J. "Lonik" Hovington)	3:42
2.	"Le Premier"	4:05
3.	"Le Bureau"	3:14
4.	"La Tête Dans Les Étoiles" (featuring J. "Lonik" Hovington)	4:12
5.	"Révolte" (featuring Youssef Nait Bach)	4:23
6.	"Montréalistan" (featuring J. "Lonik" Hovington)	4:30
7.	"Les Âmes Perdues"	3:22
8.	"Le Secret Des Dieux"	4:50
9.	"La Barre Des Trente" (featuring Hantz "Vice" Felix)	4:26
10.	"Ryan" (featuring J. "Lonik" Hovington)	5:00
11.	"Pour Chaque Goutte De Pétrole"	3:56
12.	"Ménage À Trois" (featuring J. "Lonik" Hovington)	4:28
13.	"[Untitled]"	3:32

== Personnel ==
- Manu Militari - primary artist
- Youssef Nait Bach - composer
- Hantz "Vice" Felix - composer
- J. "Lonik" Hovington - composer
- Cheb Nino - composer, guest artist
