= Maree Smith =

Australian pharmacist and researcher

Professor Maree Smith AC FAHMS

Personal details
- Born: Maree Therese Smith
- Occupation: Medical researcher

Maree Therese Smith is an Australian researcher, inventor and innovator based at the University of Queensland and an Emeritus Professor. She is executive director of the Centre for Integrated Preclinical Drug Development, and TetraQ (a drug testing facility), head of the Pain Research Group in the UQ School of Pharmacy, and the inventor and developer of a potential novel treatment for chronic pain, EMA401.

Smith received a 2012 Life Sciences Queensland Industry Award for Excellence, the 2015 Johnson & Johnson Innovation Industry Excellence Award for biotech industry leadership, and the 2016 Australian Academy of Technological Sciences and Engineering Clunies Ross Award for contributions to the application of technology for the benefit of Australia. She was elected a Fellow of the Australian Academy of Health and Medical Sciences in 2015. She was the President of the Australian Pain Relief Association between 2014 and 2016.

== Selected publications ==
- Angiotensin II type 2 receptor signalling as a pain target: Bench, bedside and back-translation, Current Opinion in Pharmacology, 2023.
- In Vitro Assessment of the Metabolic Stability of Two Novel Endomorphin-2 Analogs, CYX-5 and CYX-6, in Rat Liver Microsomes, European Journal of Drug Metabolism and Pharmacokinetics, 2023.
- Nonopioid analgesics discovery and the Valley of Death: EMA401 from concept to clinical trial, Pain, 2022.
- Prostate cancer induced bone pain: pathobiology, current treatments and pain responses from recent clinical trials, Discover Oncology, 2022.
- Bioerodable Ketamine-Loaded Microparticles Fabricated Using Dissolvable Hydrogel Template Technology, Journal of Pharmaceutical Sciences, 2019.
