= EMA401 =

Chemical compound

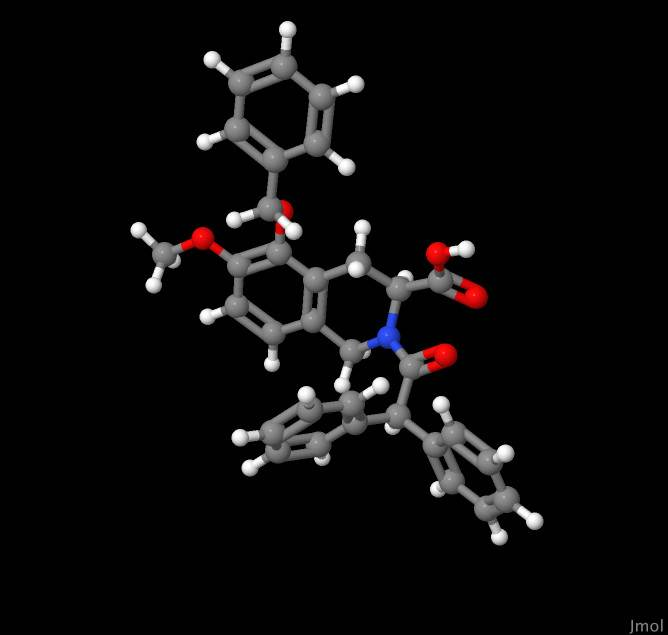

Clinical data
- Routes of administration: Oral

Legal status
- Legal status: Phase II Clinical Trials

Pharmacokinetic data
- Bioavailability: 33%
- Protein binding: Angiotensin II Subtype 2 Receptor
- Elimination half-life: 6-12 hr

Identifiers
- IUPAC name: (S)-2-(Diphenylacetyl)-1,2,3,4-tetrahydro-6-methoxy-5-(phenylmethoxy)-3-isoquinolinecarboxylic acid
- CAS Number: 1316755-17-5
- PubChem CID: 9937291
- ChemSpider: 8068121
- UNII: P9EW7EP34P
- ChEBI: CHEBI:150942
- ChEMBL: ChEMBL34124
- CompTox Dashboard (EPA): DTXSID101031601

Chemical and physical data
- Formula: C_{32}H_{29}NO_{5}
- Molar mass: 507.586 g·mol^{−1}
- 3D model (JSmol): Interactive image
- Specific rotation: +
- Density: 1.256±0.06 g/cm^{3}
- Boiling point: 745.3 ± 60.0 °C (1,373.5 ± 108.0 °F)
- Solubility in water: 14 mg/mL (20 °C)
- SMILES: COC1=C(C2=C(CN(C(C2)C(=O)O)C(=O)C(C3=CC=CC=C3)C4=CC=CC=C4)C=C1)OCC5=CC=CC=C5
- InChI: InChI=1S/C32H29NO5/c1-37-28-18-17-25-20-33(31(34)29(23-13-7-3-8-14-23)24-15-9-4-10-16-24)27(32(35)36)19-26(25)30(28)38-21-22-11-5-2-6-12-22/h2-18,27,29H,19-21H2,1H3,(H,35,36); Key:GHBCIXGRCZIPNQ-UHFFFAOYSA-N

EMA401 is a drug under development for the treatment of peripheral neuropathic pain. Trials were discontinued in 2015, with new trials scheduled to begin March, 2018. It was initially established as a potential drug option for patients suffering pain caused by postherpetic neuralgia. It may also be useful for treating various types of chronic neuropathic pain EMA401 has shown efficacy in preclinical models of shingles, diabetes, osteoarthritis, HIV and chemotherapy. EMA401 is a competitive antagonist of angiotensin II type 2 receptor (AT_{2}R) being developed by the Australian biotechnology company Spinifex Pharmaceuticals. EMA401 target angiotensin II type 2 receptors, which may have importance for painful sensitisation.

== History of drug development ==
Angiotensin II is an octapeptide hormone central to the renin-angiotensin system. It regulates blood pressure control, water fluid homeostasis, and neuronal excitability. Receptor agonists and antagonist of angiotensin II receptors that target various parts of the complicated renin-angiotensin system were developed to increase knowledge of the renin-angiotensin system and aid the development of antihypertensive drug candidates. These investigations led to the discovery of two subtypes of membrane bound G protein-coupled angiotensin receptors within the renin-angiotensin system with vastly different functions: angiotensin II type 1 receptors (AT_{1}R) and angiotensin II type 2 receptors (AT_{2}R). AT_{1}R is the receptor subtype that was found to be mainly responsible for blood pressure, water fluid regulation, and other classical known physiological actions of angiotensin II on the renin-angiotensin system.

Phase I clinical trial have indicated that doses of EMA401 up to 400 mg are safe in humans. Spinifex Pharmaceuticals reported the results of a phase 2 randomised placebo controlled - clinical trial results in which 183 patients with postherpetic neuralgia received either oral EMA401 or placebo for 28 days. Those assigned to EMA401 reported significantly less pain associated with post-herpetic neuralgia although the improvement was modest (6.9% better than placebo on a ten point pain scale). There was no evidence of any serious side effects caused by EMA401. Novartis licensed EMA401 from Spinifex Pharmaceuticals and initiated two phase 2b clinical trials. However, both trials were terminated prematurely after liver toxicity in chronic preclinical studies. Following this finding, development of EMA401 has been suspended.

== Mechanism of action ==
Angiotensin II (AngII) is an octapeptide that regulates blood pressure, controls water fluid balance, and pain perception. It activates two G protein-coupled receptors: angiotensin II type 1 receptors (AT_{1}R) and angiotensin II type 2 receptors (AT_{2}R). AngII co-localized in neurons that express substance P and calcitonin gene-related peptide suggesting its presence in nociceptors (noxious-stimuli sensing neurons). EMA401 may alleviate pain and provides relief by blocking the AngII induced potentiation which is thought to be coupled to protein kinase A.

== Pharmacokinetics ==
EMA401 is the sodium-salt form of (S)-2-(diphenylacetyl)-l,2,3,4-tetrahydro-6-methoxy-5-(phenylmethoxy)- 3-isoquinoline carboxylic acid. EMA401 dose of up to 400 mg was tested in healthy male adults without any major adverse effects.. EMA401 has been administered orally at a standardized dose of 100 mg twice daily. EMA401 reaches a maximum plasma concentration of 1000 ug/L one-hour after administration of 100 mg of EMA401 in both men and women, as observed in a phase II trial. EMA401 has an elimination half-life of 6 hours on day 1 of drug intake increasing to 12 hours by day seven of drug intake. Total plasma concentration of EMA401 is consistent over 28 days. A steady state of minimum drug plasma concentration is reached by the 8th day of being on the drug. EMA401 does not accumulate in the blood at presently administered doses. EMA401 does not cross the blood-brain barrier, therefore has little effect on the central nervous system.

== Adverse effects ==
No serious adverse effects have been observed with EMA401 in early clinical trials but there is limited evidence Slightly higher frequency of complaints such as pharyngitis, headaches and allergic dermatitis are reported by individuals taking EMA401. Headache frequency was higher in patients receiving EMA401 over placebo in both phase 1 and phase 2 clinical trials for EMA401.
