= Marée Noire =

Marée Noire (French for "Black Tide" or "oil spill") may refer to:

- Marée Noire, 2010 album by Beneath the Massacre
- Marée noire, 2004 comic in the Inspector Canardo series

== See also ==
- Oil spill
- Black Tide
