= Super Tokkyū =

Concept of high speed rail on narrow gauge lines in Japan

Super Tokkyū (スーパー特急) is the name given to the concept of building new high-speed narrow gauge (1,067 mm (3 ft 6 in)) railway lines in Japan to extend the Shinkansen network of high-speed lines.

No Super Tokkyū routes have actually been built.

== Concept ==
The Super Tokkyū concept involves building new narrow-gauge lines along the routes of planned Shinkansen lines. All infrastructure would be built to high-speed Shinkansen standards, including its wider loading gauge, 4,000 m (13,000 ft) minimum curve radius, and total grade separation, with the ability to convert the lines to 1,435 mm (4 ft 8 1/2 in) standard gauge in the future. Although they would be slower than regular Shinkansen trains, they would have a speed of more than 200 km/h (125 mph), enabling some reductions in journey times to be achieved, and total construction expenditure could be spread over a longer period, with travel times gradually reduced as more sections are completed.

The ultimate goal is eventual conversion to standard-gauge Shinkansen track once the entire line is completed, but with gauge change trains (GCTs), it may be possible in the future to upgrade these sections to full Shinkansen specifications even while inter-operation with conventional lines remains in place.

== Proposals ==
In 1991, the Super Tokkyū concept was formally planned to be used as part of the following three Shinkansen extensions:

- Kyushu Shinkansen southern section between Yatsushiro and Nishi-Kagoshima
- Tohoku Shinkansen extension between Morioka and Hakodate through the Seikan Tunnel
- Hokuriku Shinkansen extension beyond Nagano

These schemes were subsequently constructed to full Shinkansen specification lines.

The West Kyushu Shinkansen route to Nagasaki was also initially proposed as a Super Tokkyū line from Takeo-Onsen. However, after construction commenced the proposal changed to incorporate GCTs, resulting in the Takeo Onsen to Nagasaki section (subsequently opened in March 2023) being constructed as standard gauge lines. The service is proposed by GCTs using the Hakata to Shin-Tosu section of the Kyushu Shinkansen, then the narrow gauge line to Takeo Onsen, then the new West Kyushu Shinkansen line for the final section of the trip.

== See also ==
- Gauge Change Train, an experimental train designed to operate on both narrow-gauge and standard-gauge routes
- Mini-shinkansen, the concept of converting narrow-gauge lines to standard gauge for use by Shinkansen trains
- Tilt Train (Queensland)
- KTM ETS
