= Marree =

Marree may refer to the following :

- Marree, South Australia, a town and locality
- Marree Aboriginal School - refer List of schools in South Australia
- Marree Airport - refer List of airports by IATA code: R
- Marree Man, a geoglyph near Marree, South Australia
- Marree Mosque, a mosque in Marree, South Australia
- Marree railway line
- Marree railway station, a closed railway station
- Marree Subgroup, a geological formation
