= Marée Humaine =

2012 album by Québécois rapper Manu Militari

Studio album by Manu Militari
- Released: September 11, 2012
- Genre: Rap
- Length: 48:31
- Language: French
- Label: 7ième Ciel

Manu Militari chronology
Crime d'honneur (2009)	Marée Humaine (2012)	Ocean (2015)

Marée Humaine is Manu Militari's third album, released on September 11, 2012. Prior to the album's release, a music video for the song "Waiting", which shows an Afghan struggling for freedom from war, became available. The video was met with expected pushback; however, the video was taken down and the song was removed from the album.

== Track listing ==
CD
No.	Title	Length
1.	"Grande Plume"	3:53
2.	"Marche vitale"	3:41
3.	"Parole d'homme" (feat. Stan)	4:45
4.	"Changement de décor"	5:26
5.	"La Poule"	3:41
6.	"Roi de la jungle" (feat. Fafadi)	4:02
7.	"Esclave en fuite"	3:15
8.	"Un ours mal léché"	3:47
9.	"Marée humaine"	3:23
10.	"Sultan Hotel"	4:15
11.	"Rime Organisé"	3:58
12.	"Je me souviens"	4:15
