= William Maree =

American politician

William Maree was a state legislator in South Carolina. He represented Colleton County in the South Carolina House of Representatives from 1876 to 1880 52nd and 53rd General Assemblies.

He had a son William C. Maree and four daughters, three became teachers and the fourth operated the family's tourist lodging.

He was an African American.

== See also ==
- African American officeholders from the end of the Civil War until before 1900
