= Gauge Change Train =

Experimental Japanese train class

The Gauge Change Train (GCT) (Japanese: フリーゲージトレイン; lit. 'Free Gauge Train') was a Japanese research and development project launched in 1994 to create a high-speed train equipped with variable-gauge axles, enabling through operation between the 1,435 mm (4 ft 8 1/2 in) standard gauge Shinkansen network and the 1,067 mm (3 ft 6 in) narrow-gauge conventional rail network.

Three prototype electric multiple unit (EMU) trains—two three-car sets and one four-car set—were constructed for testing. The first operated from 1998 to 2006, the second from 2006 to 2014, and a third-generation train began testing in 2014; however, testing was later suspended due to technical issues with the bogies.

The GCT was originally planned for use on the Nishi Kyushu Shinkansen upon its opening in 2022 to provide through service between Hakata and Takeo-Onsen, bridging a gap in the line until it could be extended. However, in June 2017 JR Kyushu announced that it had abandoned plans to deploy the technology. Following this decision, JR West announced in August 2018 that it had also abandoned its proposed GCT deployment between Tsuruga and Osaka.

As of the late 2010s, there are no active development programs or proposals for the use of the Gauge Change Train.

== First-generation train (1998–2006) ==
Gauge Change Train (1st gen.)
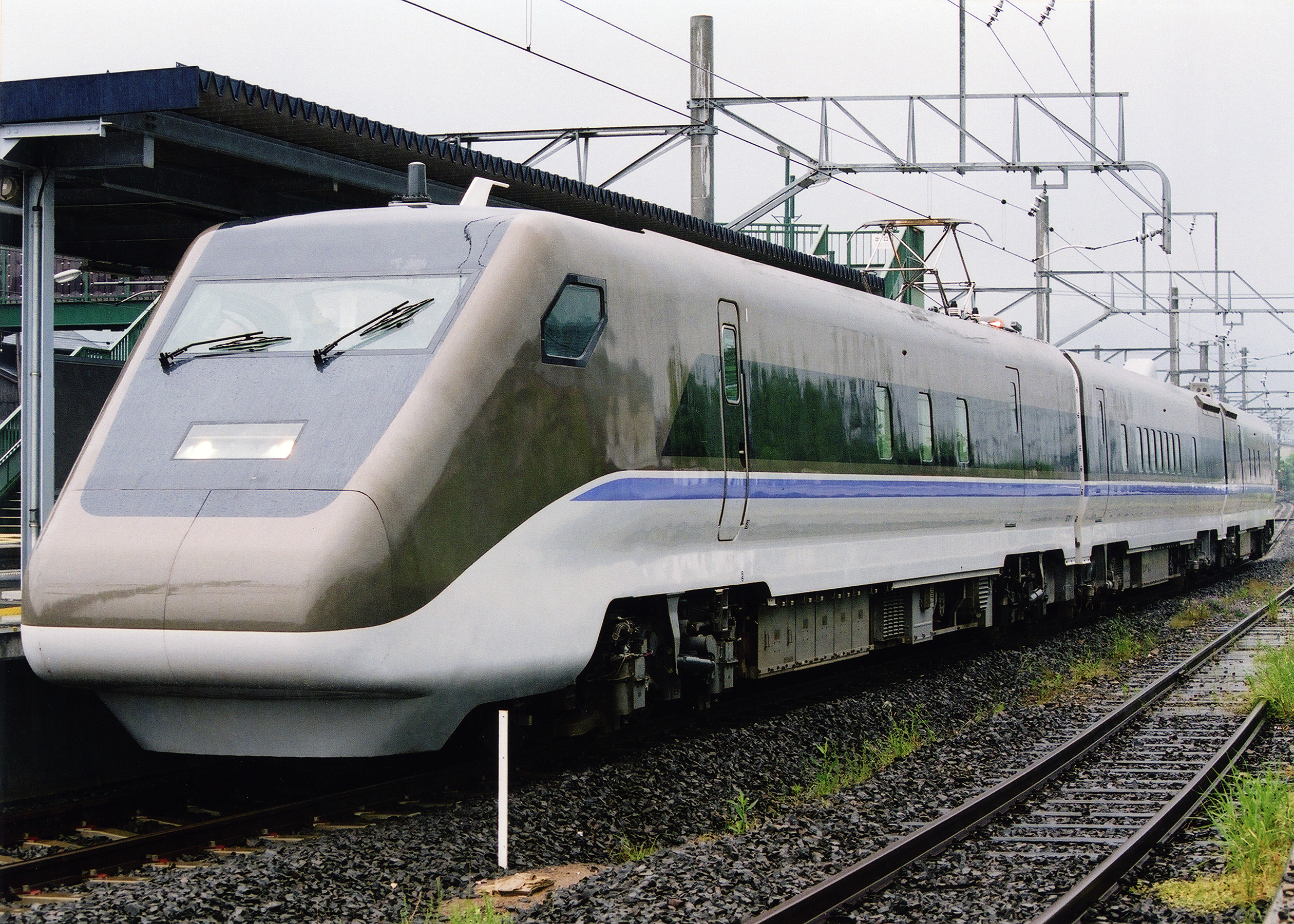
- The first-generation train on the Yosan Line in May 2003
- Manufacturers: Kawasaki Heavy Industries; Kinki Sharyo; Tokyu Car Corporation
- Constructed: 1998
- Number built: 3 vehicles
- Number preserved: 1 vehicle
- Number scrapped: 2 vehicles
- Formation: 3-car set

Specifications
- Car length: End cars: 23.075 m (75 ft 8.5 in); Intermediate car: 20.5 m (67 ft 3 in)
- Width: 2.945 m (9 ft 7.9 in)
- Maximum speed: On Shinkansen lines: 300 km/h (190 mph); On narrow gauge lines: 130 km/h (81 mph)
- Traction system: 2 × RMT17 motors per axle
- Power output: 190 kW (250 hp) per axle on 25 kV AC
- Electric systems: Overhead line: 25 kV 50 Hz AC; 25 kV 60 Hz AC; 20 kV 50 Hz AC; 20 kV 60 Hz AC; 1,500 V DC
- Current collection: Pantograph
- Track gauge: 1,067 mm (3 ft 6 in); 1,435 mm (4 ft 8 1/2 in)

The first GCT train was completed in October 1998. It was designed to be able to run at a maximum speed of over 300 km/h (186 mph) on Shinkansen lines, and at over 130 km/h (81 mph) on conventional narrow-gauge lines under a catenary voltage of 25 kV AC (50/60 Hz), 20 kV AC (50/60 Hz), or 1,500 V DC.

=== Formation ===
The train was formed as shown below, with all three cars motored.

Car No.	1	2	3
Designation	M'c1	M1	M'c2
Numbering	GCT01-1	GCT01-2	GCT01-3

Car 1 was built by Kawasaki Heavy Industries, car 2 was built by Kinki Sharyo, and car 3 was built by Tokyu Car Corporation.

=== History ===
After preparation at the Railway Technical Research Institute (RTRI) in Kokubunji, Tokyo, the train was moved to JR West tracks in January 1999 for testing on the Sanin Line at speeds of up to 100 km/h (62 mph). From April 1999, the train was shipped to the Transportation Technology Center in Pueblo, Colorado, United States for an extended period of high-speed endurance running until January 2001. Here, it recorded a maximum speed of 246 km/h (153 mph) and ran a total distance of approximately 600,000 km (372,823 mi), with approximately 2,000 axle gauge changing cycles.

In November 2002, the train recorded a maximum speed of 130 km/h (81 mph) on the Nippo Main Line in Kyushu.

From May to June 2003, the train was tested for the first time in Shikoku, running late at night on the Yosan Line between Sakaide Station and Matsuyama Station.

Testing on the Sanyo Shinkansen commenced on 23 August 2004 between Shin-Yamaguchi and Shin-Shimonoseki stations, delayed from the initial plan for testing to start during fiscal 2002. A series of 15 return test runs were conducted late at night between 23 August and 27 October 2004, starting at a maximum speed of 70 km/h (45 mph) on the first day. The maximum speed was increased to 100 km/h (62 mph) on the second day, eventually raised to 210 km/h (130 mph) on the final day.

=== Withdrawal and preservation ===
Testing ended in 2006, after which the train was stored at JR Kyushu's Kokura Works. In April 2007, the train was moved to storage at JR Shikoku's Tadotsu Works. The Tokyu end car and Kinki Sharyo intermediate car were scrapped on-site, but the Kawasaki end car, number GCT01-1, was moved to Kawasaki Heavy Industries' Kobe factory in February 2014.

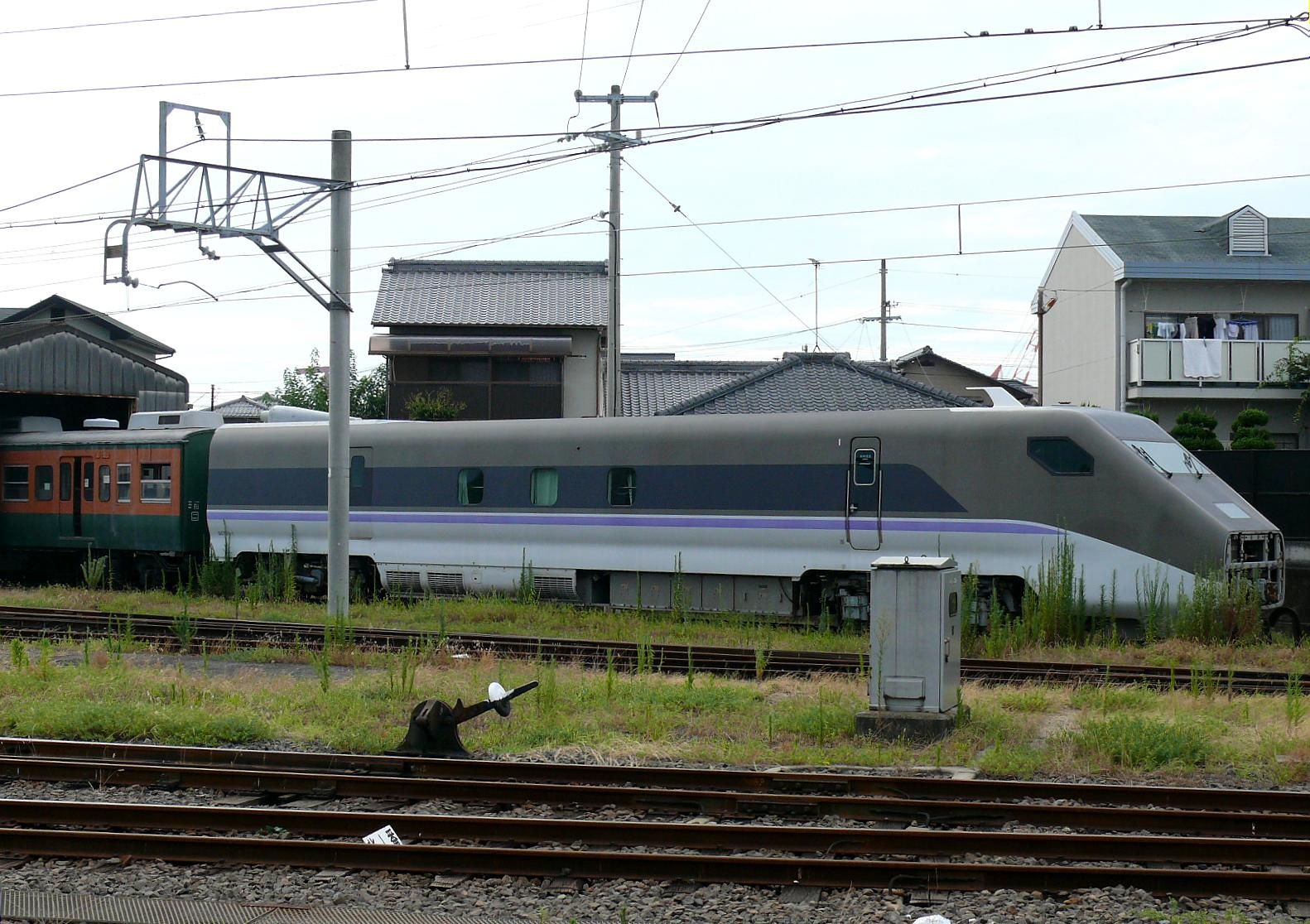
One car of the first-generation set stored at Tadotsu Works in July 2008

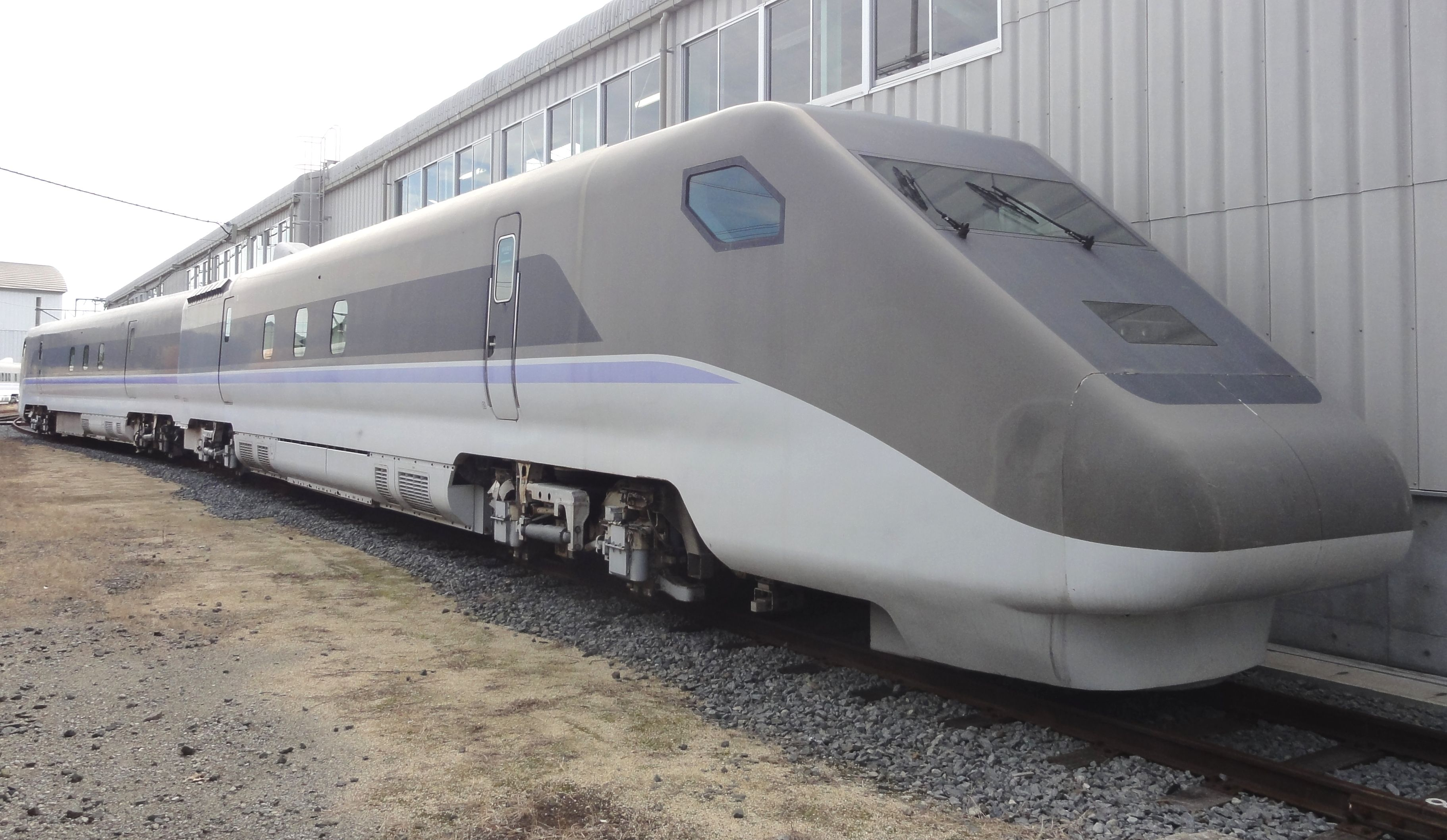
Two cars of the first-generation set stored at Tadotsu Works in October 2012

== Second-generation train (2006–2013) ==
Gauge Change Train (2nd gen.)
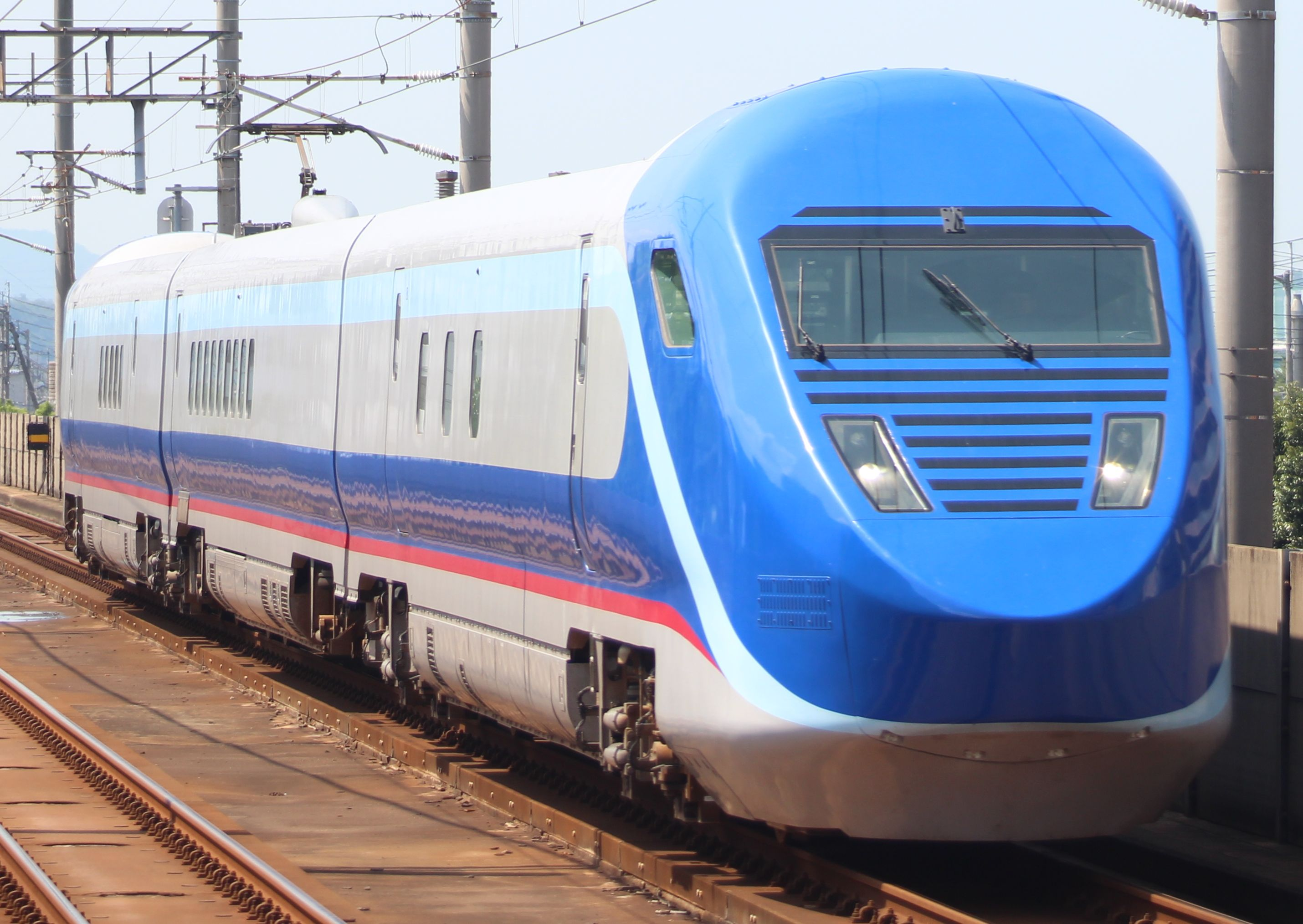
- The second-generation set undergoing testing on the Yosan Line in Shikoku in September 2012
- Constructed: 2006
- Scrapped: 2014
- Number built: 3 vehicles
- Number preserved: 1 vehicle
- Number scrapped: 2 vehicles
- Formation: 3-car set
- Capacity: 36

Specifications
- Car length: End cars: 23.075 m (75 ft 8.5 in); Intermediate car: 20.5 m (67 ft 3 in)
- Width: 2.945 m (9 ft 7.9 in)
- Height: 4.03 m (13 ft 3 in)
- Maximum speed: On Shinkansen lines: 270 km/h (170 mph); On narrow gauge lines: 130 km/h (81 mph)
- Axle load: max 12.5 t (27,558 lb)
- Electric systems: Overhead line: 25 kV 60 Hz AC; 20 kV 60 Hz AC; 1,500 V DC
- Current collection: Pantograph
- Track gauge: 1,067 mm (3 ft 6 in); 1,435 mm (4 ft 8 1/2 in)

Initially scheduled to be completed in 2004, the second train was delivered in 2006, starting test running based at JR Shikoku's Tadotsu Works. In March 2007, the train was shipped from the RTRI in Kokubunji to Kokura Works, where it was shown off to the press in May 2007.

Unlike the first train which was of an original design, this train was based on the E3 Series Shinkansen, and included passenger seating in the intermediate car. Maximum speed was 270 km/h (168 mph) on Shinkansen lines operating under 25 kV AC (60 Hz), and 130 km/h (81 mph) on conventional lines operating under 20 kV AC (60 Hz) or 1,500 V DC. It is not known if it could operate under 50 Hz power at either AC voltage.

=== Formation ===
The train was formed as shown below, with all cars motored.

Car No.	1	2	3
Designation	Mc3	M2	Mc4
Numbering	GCT01-201	GCT01-202	GCT01-203

- Car 2 was fitted with 36 seats, tilting mechanism, and a pantograph.
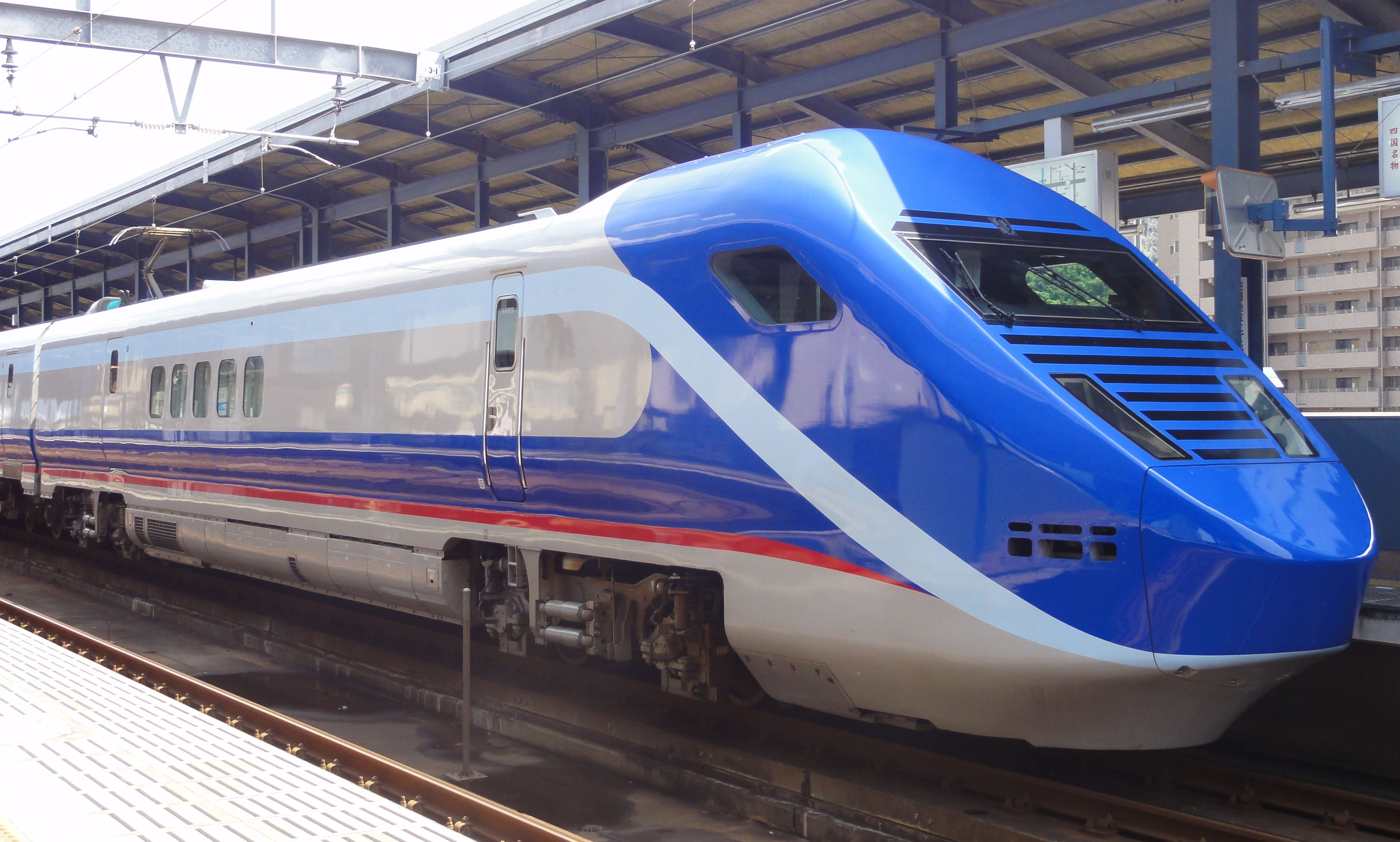
GCT01-201 in September 2012

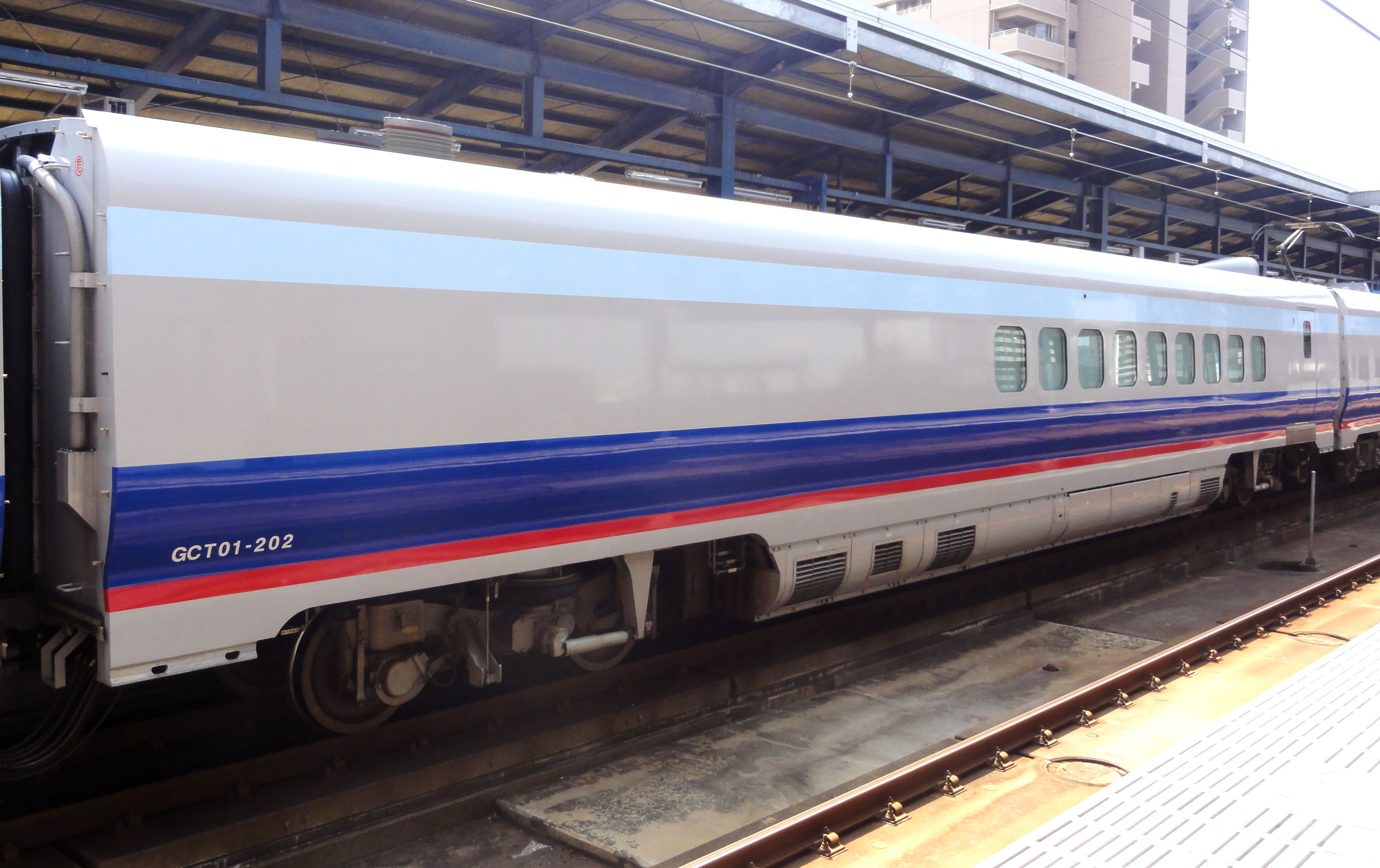
GCT01-202 in September 2012

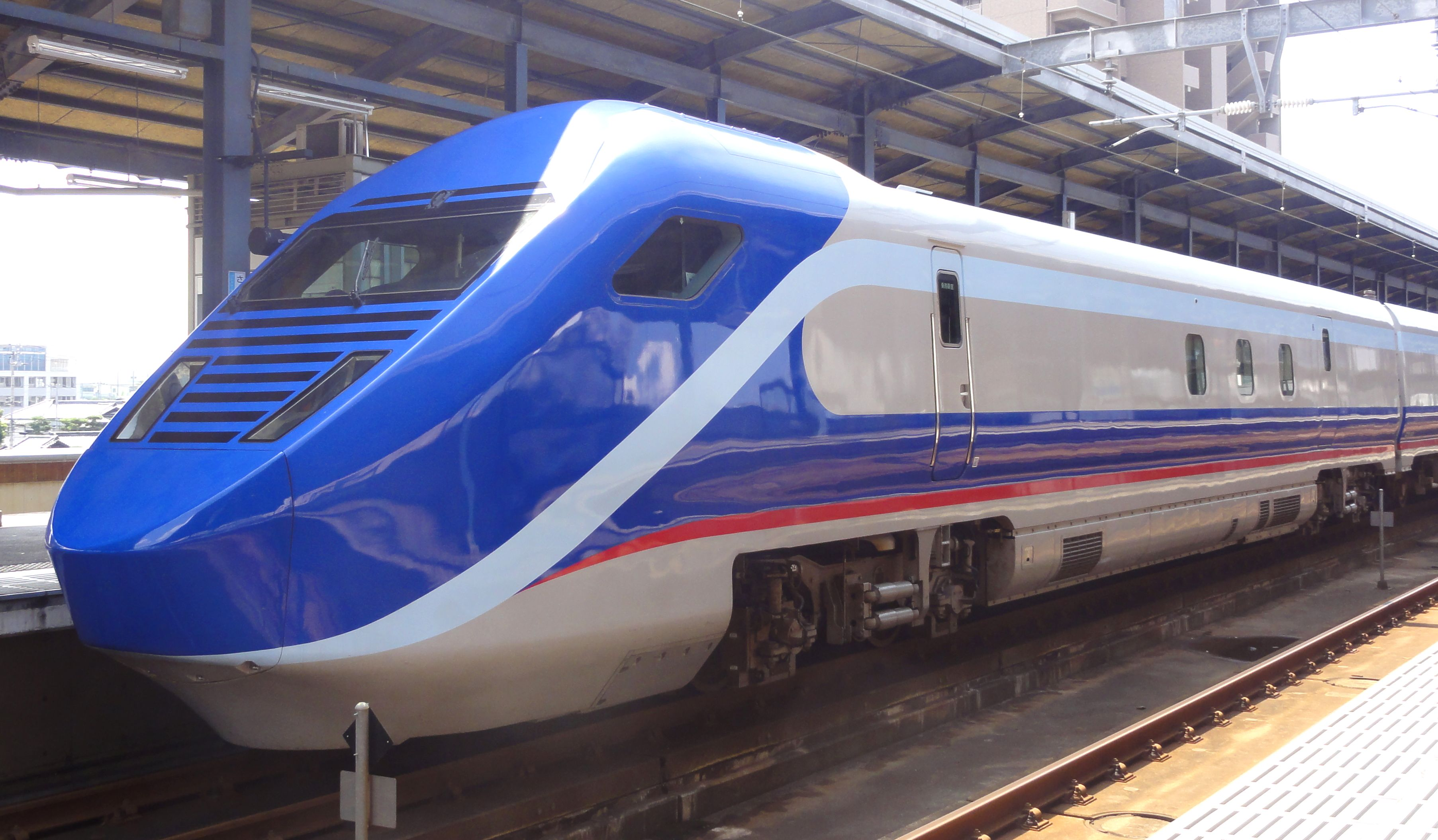
GCT01-203 in September 2012

The end cars were 23,075 mm (75 ft 8.5 in) long, and the intermediate car was 20,500 mm (67 ft 3 in) long.

=== History ===
From December 2007, test-running commenced on conventional tracks between Kokura Works and Nishi-Kokura Station.

From June 2009, the train underwent test-running between the Kyushu Shinkansen and conventional narrow gauge tracks, operating at speeds of up to 270 km/h (168 mph) on shinkansen tracks.

In 2011, the train was fitted with new lighter weight "E" bogies to improve stability and ride comfort when negotiating curves or points with radii of less than 600 m (1,969 ft). These replaced the previous "D" bogie design. Late night test running took place at speeds of up to 130 km/h (81 mph) on the Yosan Line from August 2011, with the train based at Tadotsu. Endurance testing was then undertaken from December 2011 until September 2013 on the Yosan Line between Tadotsu and Matsuyama, during which time it covered a distance of approximately 70,000 km (43,496 mi).

=== Withdrawal and preservation ===
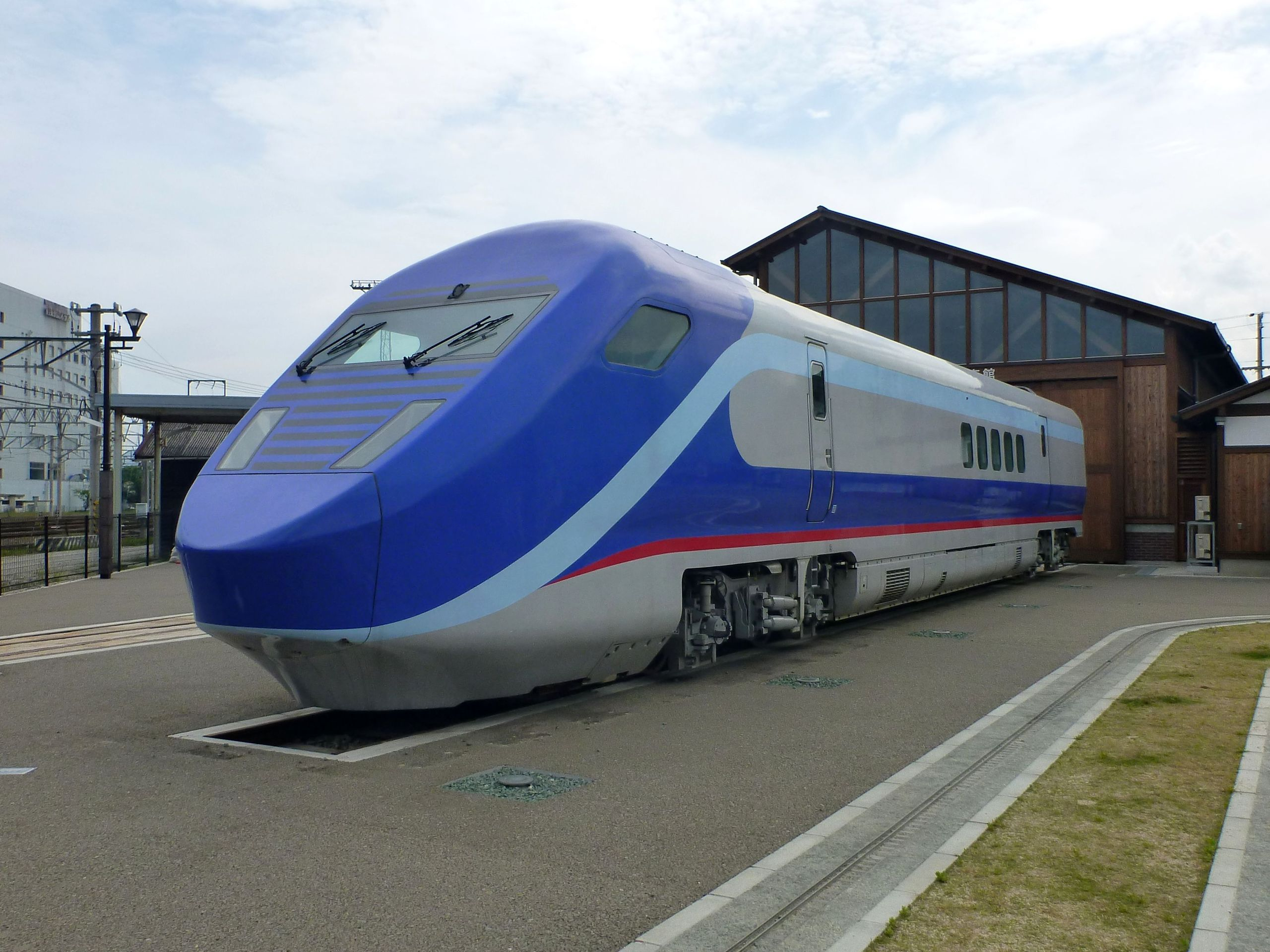
Preserved car GCT01-201 at the Shikoku Railway Heritage Museum in May 2015

Following withdrawal of the set, one end car, GCT01-201, was moved from Tadotsu to Iyo-Saijo in July 2014 for display at the Shikoku Railway Heritage Museum in Saijō, Ehime. The two other cars, GCT01-202 and GCT01-203, were cut up at JR Shikoku's Tadotsu Works in August 2014.

== Third-generation train (2014) ==
Gauge Change Train (3rd gen.)
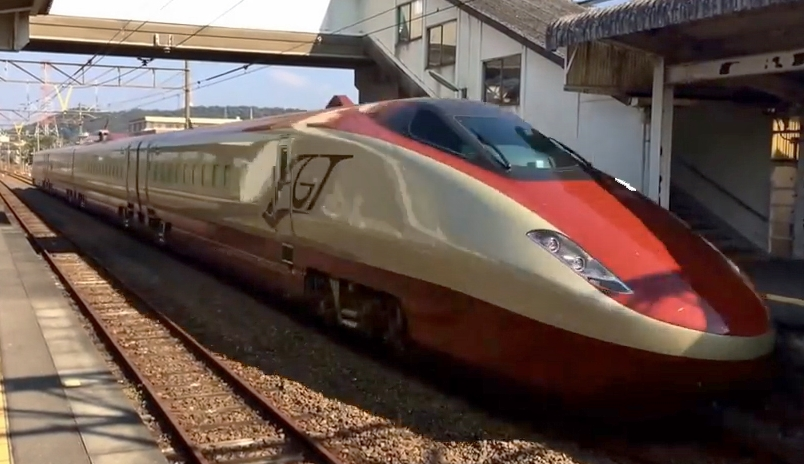
- The third-generation train, FGT-9000, on test in November 2014
- Constructed: 2014
- Number built: 4 vehicles
- Formation: 4-car set

Specifications
- Car length: End cars: 23.075 m (75 ft 8.5 in); Intermediate car: 20.5 m (67 ft 3 in)
- Width: 2.945 m (9 ft 7.9 in)
- Height: 3.65 m (12 ft 0 in)
- Maximum speed: On Shinkansen lines: 270 km/h (170 mph); On narrow gauge lines: 130 km/h (81 mph)
- Electric systems: Overhead line: 25 kV 60 Hz AC; 20 kV 60 Hz AC; 1,500 V DC
- Current collection: Pantograph
- Track gauge: 1,067 mm (3 ft 6 in); 1,435 mm (4 ft 8 1/2 in)

A third-generation, four-car, train was delivered to Kumamoto Depot in Kyushu in late March 2014, and "three-mode" (standard-gauge - gauge-changing - narrow gauge) endurance testing using a new facility built near Shin-Yatsushiro Station commenced in October 2014. Endurance testing was scheduled to continue until March 2017, accumulating a total distance of 600,000 km (372,823 mi). Testing was suspended in December 2014 after accumulating approximating 33,000 km (20,505 mi), following the discovery of defective thrust bearing oil seals on the bogies.

=== Formation ===
The train is formed as shown below, with all cars motored.

Car No.	1	2	3	4
Numbering	FGT-9001	FGT-9002	FGT-9003	FGT-9004

Cars 1, 3, and 4 were built by Kawasaki Heavy Industries in Kobe, and car 2 was built by Hitachi in Kudamatsu, Yamaguchi. Car 2 is equipped with a single-arm current collector. Seating accommodation is provided in car 2, arranged in eleven rows 2+2 abreast.

In June 2017, JR Kyushu revealed that it had abandoned plans to use the GCT on the Nagasaki Shinkansen (opened in 2022) citing reasons of cost and safety.

== JR West plans ==
In 2012, the Ministry of Land, Infrastructure, Transport and Tourism settled on a plan to introduce GCTs on the Hokuriku Shinkansen so that services could run through at Tsuruga Station onto conventional lines to Ōsaka. Two years later, JR West built a 180 meter long variable gauge test track within the yards of Tsuruga Station, on which an experimental variable-gauge bogie could be moved on trial runs through gauge-change equipment by a locomotive. The company also announced the intention to design and start building a new six-car variable-gauge trainset starting in fiscal 2014, which was scheduled to be tested from fiscal 2016 on the standard gauge Hokuriku Shinkansen and narrow-gauge Hokuriku Main Line and Kosei Line. However, as a result of the abandonment of the proposed use of a GCT on the West Kyushu Shinkansen to Nagasaki by JR Kyushu, in August 2018 JR West announced that the proposed GCT between Tsuruga and Osaka had been abandoned.

== See also ==
- Bradford Corporation Tramways
- Mini-shinkansen, the concept of converting narrow-gauge lines to standard gauge or dual gauge for use by Shinkansen trains
- Super Tokkyū, the concept of building narrow-gauge lines to Shinkansen standards
- Train on Train, an experimental concept for conveying narrow-gauge container wagons on Shinkansen tracks
