= Rime Organisé =

Canadian French rap group from Quebec

- Origin: Montreal, Quebec, Canada
- Genres: Rap
- Years active: 2000–present
- Members: Manu Militari; Charif; Mafieu (alias Drastic / Le Chat); Stan (aka le Patron); Nabo (producer)
- Website: www.tadros.com

Rime Organisé is a Canadian francophone rap group from Montreal. It was established in 2000 and is composed of Manu Militari, Charif, Mafieu (alias Drastic / Le Chat), and Stan (aka le Patron). Nabo of "Productions Hot-Box" is the producer of the group.

== History ==
Rime Organisé was established in 2000. That year the group took part in Les FrancoFolies de Montréal They won two prizes during the "Festival International Hip Hop 4 Ever" in 2003. The prize allowed the group to release their EP Règlement de compte recorded in Studio Picollo in 2003 and released in 2004. They also toured in Quebec and France to promote the album.

== Discography ==
- Règlement de compte (EP) (2004)
