= High Life Music =

Record label

- Founded: 2002
- Founder: Da Vincy
- Status: Active
- Genre: Canadian Hip Hop, rap, urban music
- Country of origin: Canada
- Location: Montreal, Quebec
- Official website: highlifemusic.ca

High Life Music (full name Les Disques HLM High Life Music) is a Montreal based independent record label created in 2002 by Da Vincy of Vice Verset, specialising in urban music. Its artists have been nominated by Association québécoise de líndustrie du disque (ADISQ) in 2006 and 2007 for the Quebec hip-hop album of the year. Some of the music has also been reviewed on CBC Radio.

This label is listed as a cultural business by the Quebec provincial agency SODEC.

== Artists ==
- 01 Étranjj
- Ale Dee
- Billy Nova
- Boogat
- Le Cerveau
- Izzo
- Limoilou Starz
- Manu Militari
- Mauvaise Frékentation
- Sir Pathétik
- Vice Verset
