= Cambridge Ring =

The term Cambridge Ring could refer to:

- The Cambridge Ring (computer network) technology developed at the university of Cambridge, England
- The Cambridge Five espionage ring.
- The inner ring-road of Cambridge, England. Made up of A1134, Gonville Place, and East Road.
