= David Farrell (judge) =

British judge

David Anthony Farrell (born May 1956) is a current UK circuit judge who holds the position of "Resident Judge" at Cambridge Crown Court. Farrell was appointed to the South Eastern Circuit on 18 July 2011.

Farrell is due take on the ceremonial position of Honorary Recorder of Cambridge, a civic position revived in 2013. Farell's predecessor Gareth Hawkesworth was appointed to the position following a unanimous vote of Cambridge City Councillors.

== Career ==
Farrell was called to the Bar (became a barrister) in 1978 and became a Queen's Counsel in 2000. He was appointed as an assistant recorder in 1996 and as a recorder in 2000.

Farrell was the first Queen's Counsel in the UK to achieve accreditation under a new Scheme for High Cost Criminal Cases introduced in 2010.

Farrell served as a director of 36 Bedford Row Limited from 15 June 1995 until 2 December 2000.

== Channer/Monteiro Case ==
In 2011 Farrell presided over a case of the rape of an 11-year-old girl in Luton. Two men, Roshane Channer and Ruben Monteiro, both 21, pleaded guilty. Following the sentencing Attorney General Dominic Grieve made a submission to the Court of Appeal stating that "the judge over-emphasised the apparent age of the complainant and failed to place sufficient weight upon the obligation upon the offenders to make enquiries as to the age of the child." Also, he was said to have given "too much weight to the 'willingness' of the complainant." The appeal court replaced Farrell's with sentences of seven years' detention in a young offender institution.
