= East Road =

East Road may refer to:

- East Road, Cambridge, England
- East Road, London, England
- East Road, a road mentioned in J. R. R. Tolkien's stories of Middle-earth
