= David Farrell =

David Farrell may refer to:

- David Farrell (footballer, born 1969), Scottish-born football defender for Hibernian and Partick Thistle
- David Farrell (footballer, born 1971), English-born football midfielder for Peterborough United
- David Farrell (Gaelic footballer)
- David Farrell (judge) (born 1956), British judge
- David Farrell (political scientist) (born 1960)
- David Farrell (politician) (1891–1953), member of the Queensland Legislative Assembly
- Dave Farrell (born 1977), bassist of American rock band Linkin Park
