= Ipswich Transport Museum =

Transport museum in Ipswich, England

Coordinates: 52.040492°N 1.196544°E

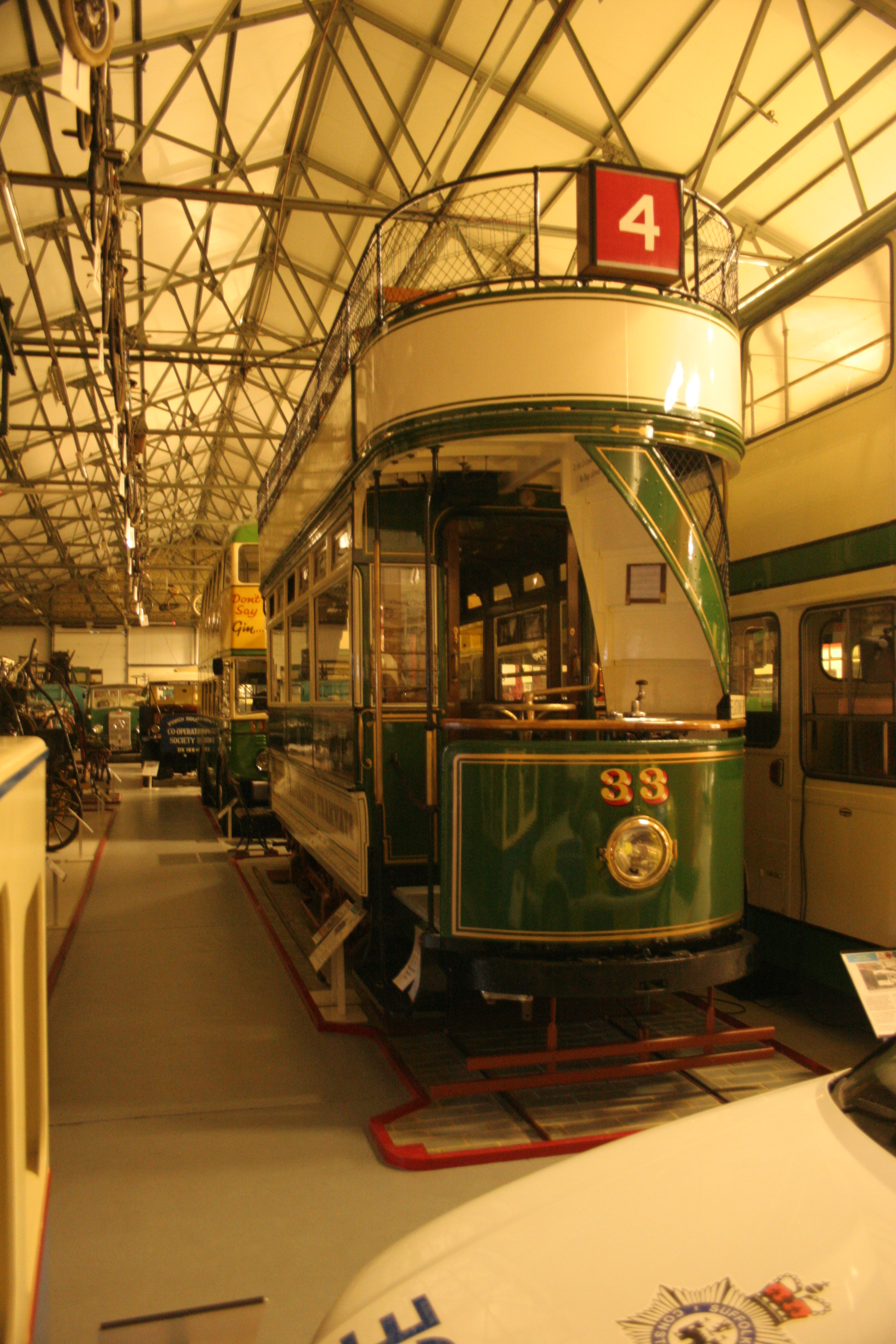
Tramcar 33 (1904) stands next to Ipswich Borough Transport Roe bodied Leyland Atlantean AN68 1/R number 6, view towards back of the museum

The Ipswich Transport Museum is a museum in Ipswich, Suffolk, England, devoted principally to the history of transport and engineering objects made or used in its local area.

The museum collection was started by the Ipswich Transport Preservation Group in 1965. In 1988 it obtained use of its present premises, the old Priory Heath trolleybus depot in Cobham Road, and has been opened to the public since 1995.

Its collection of more than 100 large objects includes buses trams, trolley- and motor-buses from Ipswich Corporation Transport, the Eastern Counties Omnibus Company and other local operators; commercial vehicles; fire apparatus; mobile cranes; bicycles; biers; horse-drawn vehicles; prams; and wheelchairs. There is a good representation of the Ipswich manufacturers Ransomes, Sims & Jefferies and Ransomes & Rapier and of electric vehicles.

Local rail and waterway transport and aviation are represented mainly by photographic collections and smaller exhibits. The Museum also houses an archive and library together with costume and ticket collections.

The Museum is a registered charity, and is normally open to visitors on Sundays (11am to 4pm) from April to November; and on weekday afternoons during school holidays (1pm to 4pm). It also organises occasional events including the annual Ipswich to Felixstowe Run for vintage vehicles on the first Sunday in May, from Christchurch Park, Ipswich to the Promenade in Felixstowe.

== Collection ==
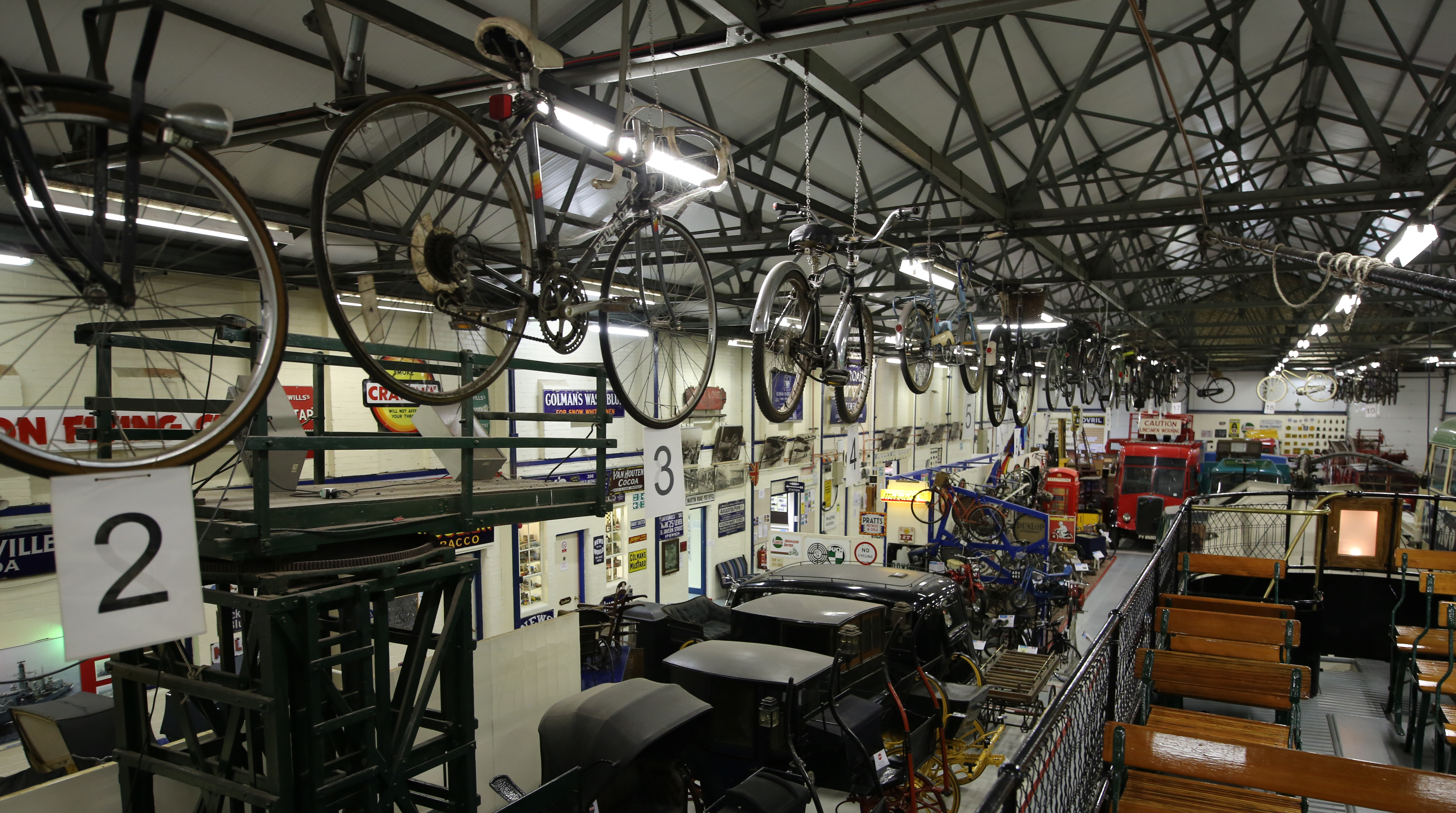
View over part of the main gallery

The collection started 50 years ago with just one bus (an Eastern Counties Dennis Ace), and has grown into a most comprehensive selection of objects. Exhibits include trams, trolleybuses, motorbuses, lorries, fire engines, horse-drawn vehicles, bicycles, prams, ambulances, a police car, and even a funeral hearse. The collection is supported by a variety of small exhibits, display material and ephemera.

The museum also houses the Ipswich Engineering Collection, which includes many items from well known companies including Ransomes, Sims and Jefferies, Ransomes and Rapier, Cranes, Reavell and Cocksedge. The display includes cranes, fork lift trucks, lawnmowers and agricultural equipment.

Restoration of a Co-op horse drawn bread van was completed around 2018, and other ongoing projects at that time included a Dennis Ace bus from 1939 and a Scammell Scarab mechanical horse dating from 1965. The restoration team then turned their attention to a Co-op battery-electric coal truck manufactured by Morrison-Electricar, on which some work had been carried out from 2006. They managed to secure a grant of £7,000 from the Association of Industrial Archaeology in 2018, which would enable them to restore it to working order by refurbishing the motor and control equipment, and purchasing new batteries.

Restoration of a Cambridge horse tram previously with Bath Tramways and then Bradford and Shelf Tramways, was completed in 2019. The car was built in 1880 for the 4 ft (1,219 mm)-gauge Bath Tramways. That system was taken over by the Patent Cable Tramways Corporation in 1884, and was sold again to become part of the standard gauge Bath Electric Tramways in 1902. Car No.6 was sold back to Starbucks, and then to the Bradford and Shelf Tramway around 1886, where it was hauled by steam tram locomotives, until that system closed in 1903 to be replaced by electric trams. At some point the vehicle moved to the Cambridge Street Tramways, probably in 1894, when a Starbuck vehicle became their No.7, and when that system closed in 1914, all eight of the trams were sold at an auction. It became a shed, and was rediscovered in 1988, when the lower deck was being used as a cobbler's workshop in Ely. Faced with the possibility that it might be demolished, it was obtained by the museum, and a seven-year restoration began in 2012. Rubbing down of the bodywork revealed its former life in Bradford, while removal of the opening toplight windows revealed handwriting confirming that it had originally been built for Bath. Restoration was assisted by a grant of £49,000 from the Heritage Lottery Fund. The tram was built with a single deck, with an upper deck added at Bradford in the 1880s, but as few details survived, recreating the upper deck was particularly challenging. The vehicle has been restored in the paintwork of Cambridge Street Tramways No. 7.

=== Early vehicles ===
- Starbuck horse tram - Cambridge Street Tramways - built in 1880.
- Brush tramcar - Ipswich Corporation Tramways No. 33 with open top double deck body - built in 1904.
- Ransomes 3 ton 4.5 cwt electric dustcart - DX 1664 - that was originally hired by Birmingham city council in 1915 for testing purposes. It was returned to Ramsones in December 1919 where it was used as a work vehicle into the 1960s before being loaned to the museum.
- Railless trolleybus - Ipswich Corporation No. 2 with English Electric equipment and 30-seat Short single deck body - DX 3988 - built in 1923. It was withdrawn in 1934 and moved to Flatford, where it was used as a caravan. The museum obtained it in 1977 and it was cosmetically restored by 1981. Around 2007 it was fitted with an Estler trolleybase, where the two trolleypoles are mounted one above the other on a central pivot.
- Ransomes, Sims & Jefferies type D trolleybus - Ipswich Corporation No. 9 with English Electric/RS&J equipment and 31-seat single deck body - DX 5610 - built in 1926. It originally has a front entrance and rear exit with 30 seats, but was rebuilt in the 1930s with rear access only. Withdrawn in October 1949, it then served as part of a house at Theberton until it was acquired in July 1972. In 2007 it was exhibited in "as found" condition.
- Ransomes, Sims & Jefferies type D trolleybus - Ipswich Corporation No. 16 - part of the same batch as No. 9 - DX 5617 - built in 1926. It was upgraded with pneumatic tyres in the 1930s, and withdrawn from service in June 1950. Only the chassis survives.
- Richard Garrett & Sons type O trolleybus - Ipswich Corporation No. 26 with Strachans & Brown 31-seat single deck body - DX 5629 - built in 1926. It was used as a summerhouse at Pin Mill following withdrawal in 1945, and was obtained for preservation by the Long Shop Museum at Leiston, but was loaded to the museum in 1995 and subsequently donated in 2004.
- Tilling-Stevens B9B bus - Eastern Counties Roadcar Company No 78 - DX 6591 - built in 1927.

=== 1930s vehicles ===
- Chevrolet LQ coach - VF 8157 - built in 1930.
- Bedford WLB bus - WV 1209 - built in 1932.
- Ransomes, Sims & Jefferies trolleybus - Ipswich Corporation No. 46 with English Electric equipment and H24/24R double deck body - PV 817 - built in 1933. It was shown at the Commercial Vehicle Show in 1933, and was one of the first batch of four double deck vehicles obtained by the corporation. After withdrawal from service in August 1951, it was used as a caravan at Needham Market before being acquired for preservation in 1971. All of the electrical equipment needed to restore the vehicle had been amassed by 2007, but there were no immediate plans to start restoration.
- Dennis Ace bus - Eastern Counties - CAH 923 - built in 1938.
- Leyland Cub Fire Engine - PV 4974 - built in 1938.
- Bristol L5G bus - Eastern Counties - CVF 874 - built in 1939.
- Dennis New World Fire Engine - EBJ 732 - built in 1939.

=== 1940s vehicles ===
- Ransomes MG Crawler tractor - built in 1947.
- AEC Monarch tower wagon - Ipswich Corporation - PV 8580 - built in 1948.
- Karrier W trolleybus - Ipswich Corporation No. 105 with Metropolitan-Vickers equipment and Park Royal Vehicles H30/26R double deck body - PV 8270 - built in 1948. After withdrawal, it was used as a mobile Civil Defence showroom and then as a canteen, until it was obtained by the museum in 1971. An 11-year restoration project started in 2003, and the vehicle was returned to operational status in 2014, at a cost of some £25,000.
- Smith Electric Vehicles / Northern Coach Builders electric milk float - Ipswich Co-op E56D - PV 8337 - built in 1948. This was one of a batch of electric vehicles obtained in 1948 to replace the last horse-drawn delivery services operated by the Co-op. It was presented to the museum in 1975, following withdrawal.
- Bedford OB - PV 9371 - built in 1949.
- Bristol K6B bus - Eastern Counties - KNG 374 - built in 1949.
- Bristol L4G bus - Eastern Counties - KAH 407 - built in 1949.
- Land Rover fire engine - build in 1949.

=== 1950s vehicles ===
- AEC Regent III bus - Ipswich Corporation Transport No 1 - ADX 1 - built in 1950.
- Bristol LS bus - Eastern Counties - MAH 744 - built in 1950.
- Commer Avenger Fire Appliance - KRT 920 - built in 1950.
- Sunbeam F4 trolleybus - Ipswich Corporation No. 126 with Metrovick equipment and Park Royal H30/25R double deck body - ADX 196 - built in 1950. It was sold to the Walsall system in 1962 for further use, and was obtained by the museum in 1970 when that system closed. It was stored at the Sandtoft Trolleybus Museum for a time, where it ran occasionally, but subsequently moved to the Ipswich site.
- Atkinson 8-wheel lorry - built in 1950.
- Morrison-Electrical coal lorry - Ipswich Co-op E92C - APV 94 - built in 1951. This was one of a pair of vehicles bought for coal delivery, which worked out of the coal yard on Derby Road, to the east of the town. It was withdrawn in 1983, when the Co-op ceased to deliver coal, and remained in the open until November 1989, when the museum acquired it. Some restoration was carried out in 2006.
- AEC Regal IV bus - Ipswich Corporation Transport No 9 - BPV 9 - built in 1953.
- AEC Regent III bus - Ipswich Corporation Transport No 16 - CDX 516 - built in 1954.
- Ford E83W pickup - build in 1954.
- Mercury Truck and Tractor Co timber tractor unit - CDX 894 - built in 1954. This was bought new by William Browns of Ipswich, and used for hauling timber in the dock area. It was obtained by the museum in 1974, and the bodywork had been completely rebuilt using authentic materials by 2007.
- Dennis F12 P/E fire engine - built in 1954.

=== 1960s vehicles ===
- Bristol HA6G articulated lorry - built in 1962.
- Bedford J emergency vehicle - built in 1962.
- AEC Regent V bus - Ipswich Corporation Transport No 63 - ADX 63B - built in 1964.
- Bristol MW bus - Eastern Counties - APW 829B - built in 1964.
- Bristol LFS bus - Eastern Counties - GNG 125C - built in 1965.
- Scammell Scarab 3-wheel tractor unit - built in 1965.
- Smith electric vegetable cart - Ipswich Co-op - FDX 346D - built in 1965. This was used for door-to-door deliveries of green groceries. Ipswich Co-op once had over 40 vehicles engaged in this activity, and this was one of the final three before the service was withdrawn in the summer of 2001. All three vehicles were donated to the museum, the other two carrying registration numbers of EPV 228D and FDX 621D.
- AEC Regent V bus - Ipswich Corporation Transport No 68 - DPV 68D - built in 1966.
- Brush Pony electric van - UPV 982 - built in 1967. This was built for St Helens Hospital, Ipswich, in 1967, but was not registered for use on roads until 1970. It was used as a laundry van, and subsequently worked at Heath Road Hospital. It was presented to the museum in October 1990.

=== Later vehicles ===
- Commer Maxiload TS3 lorry - built in 1970.
- AEC Swift bus - Ipswich Corporation Transport No 82 - JRT 82K - built in 1971.
- Karrier Bantam lorry - built in 1974.
- Scania Super 110 lorry - built in 1974.
- Leyland Atlantean AN68 bus - Ipswich Corporation Transport No 6 - MRT 6P - built in 1976.
- Leyland National bus - Eastern Counties - XNG 770S - built in 1978.
- Ford Transit Ambulance - B287 XFL - built in 1984.
- Leyland Sherpa K2-250 electric van - Ipswich Buses - B974 PDX - built in 1985. This was part of an experimental batch of Freight Rover Sherpa vans converted to use battery electric power. The battery voltage was 230V, and it was designed to run at speeds compatible with normal traffic. Ipswich Buses ran it for four years as a general runabout, until the electronic controller failed in 1989. The museum bought it in February 1990, and have since replaced the controller.
- Land Rover fire tender - Ipswich Borough Council - Q913 EGV - built in the 1980s. This was once a standard 4-wheel drive Land Rover, but a third axle and a Rover V8 engine were fitted, as were a water tank and pump, to allow it to act as a fire tender at Ipswich Airport. The airport closed in 1987, and the vehicle was donated to the museum, complete with most of its fire-fighting equipment. Only the ladder is missing.
- Optare Spectra bodied DAF DB250 bus - built 2000 for Ipswich Buses - X153 LBJ, donated by Lynx
- Vauxhall Omega police car - X428 LGV - built in 2000.
- Renault Master ambulance - built in 2000.

== See also ==
- Trolleybuses in Ipswich

== Bibliography ==
- Ipswich Transport Museum (2005). Museum Guide.
- "The Ipswich Transport Museum". Vintage Roadscene. 99: 57–8. January–February 2008.
- BBC (11 April 2014). "Ipswich restored trolleybus ready for passengers". Archived from the original on 14 April 2014.
- BBC (2 November 2019). "Cambridge tramcar restored by Ipswich Transport Museum". Archived from the original on 2 November 2019.
- De Boer, Roger F (1990). Birmingham's Electric Dustcarts. Birmingham & Midland Motor Omnibus Trust. ISBN 978-0-905586-07-6.
- Joyce, J; King, J S; Newman, A G (1986). British Trolleybus Systems. London: Ian Allan Publishing. ISBN 978-0-7110-1647-7.
- Prior, Gareth (6 October 2013). "Second hand Cambridge horse tram is third hand!". British Trams Online. Archived from the original on 4 May 2014.
- Prior, Gareth (27 May 2019). "Cambridge Horse tram 7 almost complete". British Trams Online. Archived from the original on 7 June 2019.
- Staff Writer (2020). "What's here". Ipswich Transport Museum.
- Turner, Keith (1996). The Directory of British Tramways. Patrick Stephens. ISBN 978-1-85260-549-0.
- Zebedee, John (2007). "Ipswich Transport Museum". British Trolleybus Society. Archived from the original on 9 January 2017.
