= Cambridge Street Tramways =

Cambridge horse-drawn tramway service

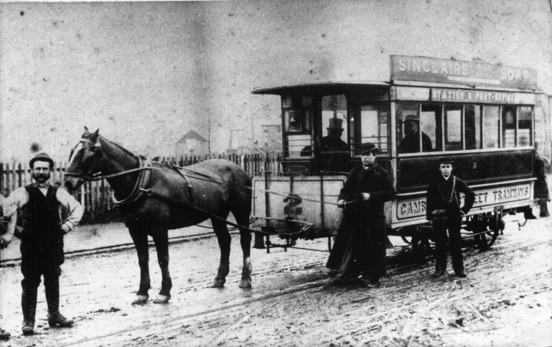
- Horse-drawn tram, c. 1880 to c. 1890

Operation
- Locale: Cambridge, England
- Open: 28 October 1880
- Close: 18 February 1914
- Status: Closed

Infrastructure
- Track gauge: 4 ft (1,219 mm)
- Propulsion system: Horse
- Depot(s): Junction of East Road and Dover Street

Statistics
- Route length: 2.67 miles (4.30 km)
Overview

Cambridge Street Tramways operated a horse-drawn tramway service in Cambridge, England, between 1880 and 1914.

== History ==
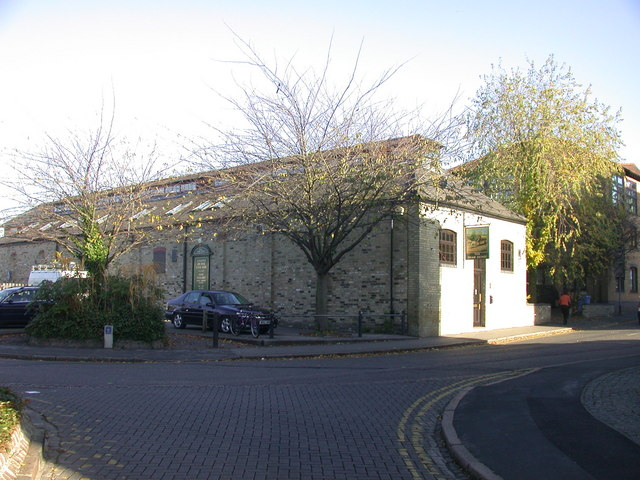
Back of the tram depot from Dover Street

When railways reached Cambridge in the 1840s, the main station was built around 1 mile (1.6 km) from the city centre, as a result of sustained opposition from the university authorities. A means was, therefore, necessary to transport passengers from the station to the city, and two rival schemes for a horse tramway were proposed. Of these, it was the Cambridge Street Tramways Company which was authorised to proceed.

The tramways were built with a rail gauge of 4 ft (1,219 mm), and the first section to open linked Cambridge railway station to Cambridge Post Office, then located next to St Andrew the Great's Church in Sidney Street, running along Station Road, Hills Road, and Regent Street. The tramway was inspected by Major General Charles Scrope Hutchinson from the Board of Trade and opened for public use on 28 October 1880. A branch from Market Hill to the junction of Hills Road and Regent Street, running along Trumpington Street and Lensfield Road, followed in November 1880, and shortly afterwards, this was extended along Gonville Place to East Road. The routes crossed at Hyde Park Corner, next to the church of Our Lady and the English Martyrs, but were always worked as two separate lines. The system was mainly single track, with a short section of double track in Hills Road.

Other lines proposed along Newmarket Road, Maid’s Causeway, and Emmanuel Road were not constructed. The depot, at the junction of East Road and Dover Street, is now a pub named "The Tram Depot".

== Closure ==
In the early 1910s, British Electric Traction, a private company that owned several tramway systems, took an interest in the Cambridge system but were unable to suggest an acceptable solution for electrifying them. Since 1908, the trams had suffered from competition as a result of the formation of the Ortona Bus Service. British Electric Traction took the decision in early 1914 to abandon the trams and invest in the Ortona Motor Company. The tramway system closed on 18 February 1914, and the company was wound up in that month after the corporation sued for failing to pay their rates. The assets of the company were put up for sale and included 24 active draught horses, 6 double-deck tramcars and 2 single-deck cars and equipment and machinery from the stables.

The tramway operated a fleet of eight cars. When it first opened, there were two double-deck vehicles, numbered 1 and 4, and two single-deck vehicles numbered 2 and 3. The latter two both had an upper deck added at some point. Two more single-deck cars had been obtained by 1892, which were numbered 5 and 6, while in 1894 number 7, a double-deck car manufactured by Starbuck, joined the fleet. The final vehicle was car number 8, a double-deck car obtained in 1909. When the system closed, all eight vehicles were sold by auction and found various uses. Tram number 7 became a workshop extension to a bungalow in Ely. It survived long enough to be acquired for preservation by the Ipswich Transport Museum in 2003 and has been restored aided by a grant from the Heritage Lottery Fund. Restoration revealed that it had been built by the Starbuck Car and Wagon Company of Birkenhead around 1880, initially for the Bath Tramways Company, where it operated until around 1884. It was then purchased by the Bradford and Shelf Tramway Company, where it was probably used as a trailer to a steam tram, although details are sketchy, before moving to the Cambridge system in 1894.

== Bibliography ==
- Klapper, Charles (1974). The Golden Age of Tramways (2nd ed.). David & Charles. ISBN 978-0-7153-6458-1.
- Prior, Gareth (27 May 2019). "Cambridge Horse tram 7 almost complete". British Trams Online. Archived from the original on 7 June 2019.
- Turner, Keith (1996). The Directory of British Tramways. Patrick Stephens. ISBN 978-1-85260-549-0.
