= Bath Tramways =

Tram system in Bath, Somerset, England

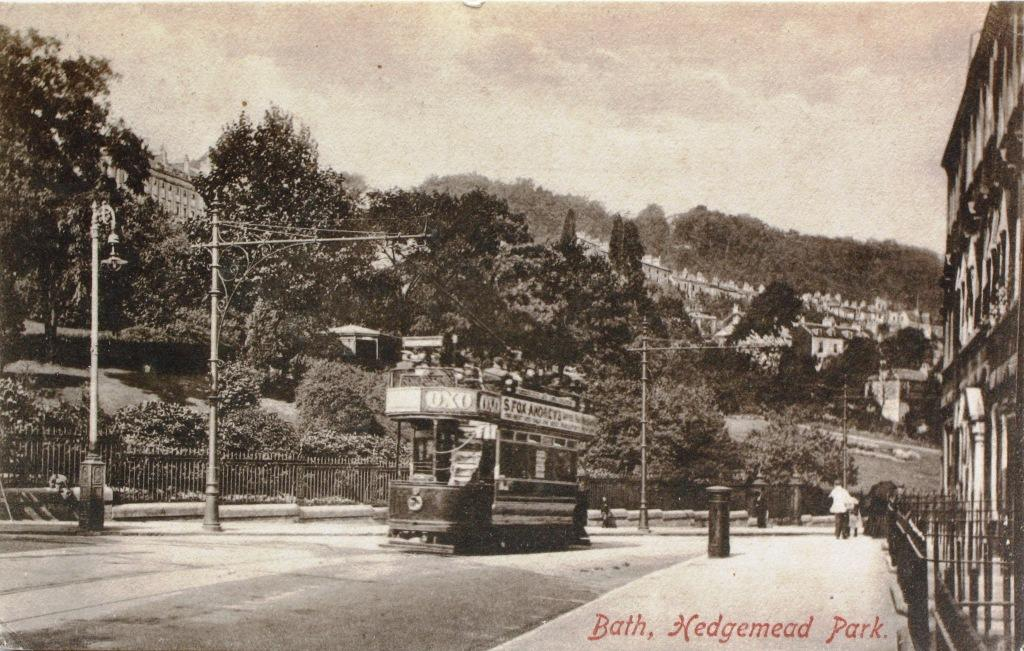
- A tram heading towards Bathford

Operation
- Locale: Bath

Statistics
Bath Tramways Company era: 1880–1902
- Routes: Bath Spa railway station via Southgate Street, High Street and Walcot to Grosvenor College
- Track gauge: 4 ft (1,219 mm)
- Propulsion system: Horse
- Depots: South side of London Road, near junction with Brunswick Street
- Route length: 1.71 miles (2.75 km)
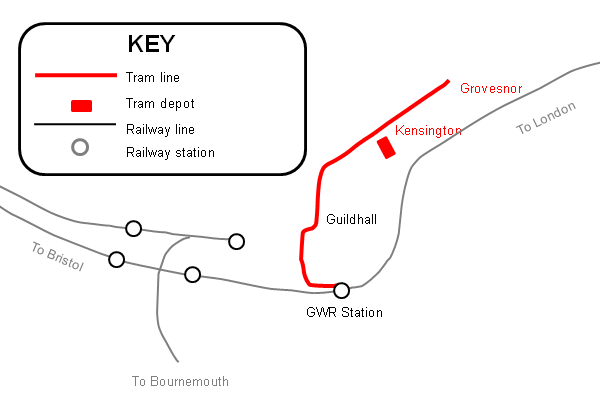
Bath Electric Tramways era: 1902–1939
- Routes: Bathford, Combe Down Weston, Oldfield Park and Newton St Loe
- Owner: British Electric Traction
- Operator: Bath Electric Tramways Company
- Track gauge: 4 ft 8 1/2 in (1,435 mm)
- Propulsion system: Electric
- Depot: Beehive Yard off Walcot Street
- Route length: 14.78 miles (23.79 km)
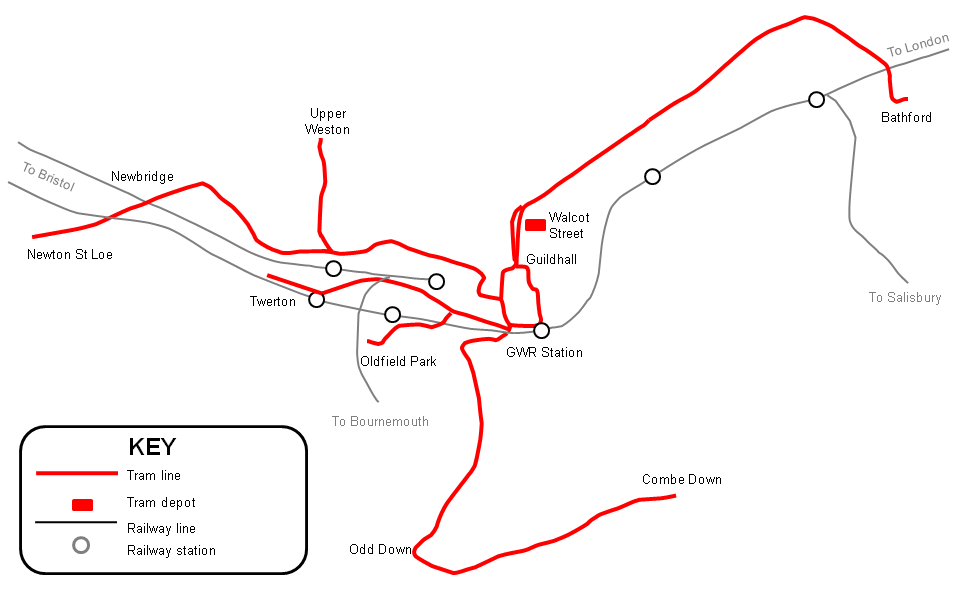

Bath Tramways Company and its successors operated a 4 ft (1,219 mm) horse-drawn tramway service in Bath between 1880 and 1902. From 1903 until its closure in 1939 an expanded route carried electric trams operated by Bath Electric Tramways Company.

== History ==
The first service ran on 24 December 1880. The initial 4 ft (1,219 mm) line was from the Bath Spa railway station via Southgate Street, High Street and Walcot to Grosvenor College. It used six horse drawn cars built by George Starbuck of Birkenhead, with a stable and depot in Kensington.

The service was not profitable and on 26 May 1884 the company was taken over by the Patent Cable Tramways Corporation. Seven further 12-seater cars were purchased. It entered liquidation and was taken over by Dick, Kerr & Co. on 11 August 1888. This was taken over by the Bath Road Car and Tramways Company, who already ran the buses in the area, on 1 April 1889. The horse drawn service continued until 1902 when the company was taken over by Bath Corporation and modernised and electrified by the Bath Electric Tramways Company, a subsidiary of British Electric Traction.

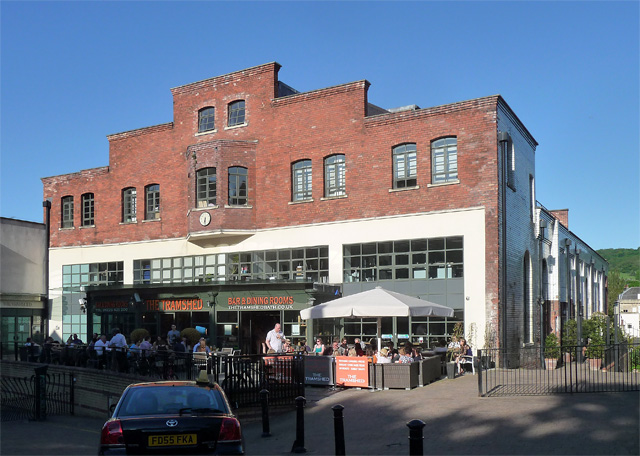
The former Bath Electric Tramways depot, Walcot Street

The 4 ft (1,219 mm) tracks were taken up and replaced by a 4 ft 8 1/2 in (1,435 mm) track. Six electric cars were brought in December 1903 and on 2 January 1904 the new service opened. Additional lines to Bathford, Combe Down, Weston and Oldfield Park were constructed. The company fleet was blue and yellow. There were 18 55-seat tramcars all purchased in 1903 and 1904 from G. F. Milnes & Co. which operated from a new depot in Beehive Yard off Walcot Street. In 1905 an additional line to Newton St Loe opened and proposals were drawn up to connect this with Bristol Tramways although this was never built. To operate this line the fleet was joined by four single-decked 30-seat cars known as 'whippets'. Bath Tramways Motor Co was set up in 1920, to operate motor buses as a subsidiary of Bath Electric Tramways Co. On 3 July 1933, a tram ran away backwards on Wells Road and crashed into another tram. A passenger was killed and fifteen were injured.

In 1936 Bath Electric Tramways Co and its subsidiary Bath Tramways Motor Co were both taken over by the Bristol Tramways and Carriage Company (BTCC) who began to replace the trams with their buses. The Newton St Loe line closed in 1938 with the rest closing in May the following year. The two Bath companies continued to exist as bus-owning subsidiaries of the BTCC, and some buses bought or ordered by the BTCC were placed in the ownership of one or the other of the two Bath companies. This arrangement continued until December 1969, when the two Bath companies were fully absorbed by the Bristol Omnibus Company (Note: The Bristol Tramways and Carriage Company was renamed the Bristol Omnibus Company in 1957) (BOC), but the Bath fleetname continued to be used on some Bath-based BOC buses for another ten years.

One of the original horse-drawn tramcars has been preserved, and is now at the Ipswich Transport Museum. It was built by Starbuck Car and Wagon Company of Birkenhead as a single deck vehicle around 1880, and operated in Bath until around 1884. It was then purchased by the Bradford and Shelf Tramway Company, where it was probably used as a trailer to a steam tram, although details are sketchy. By 1894 an upper deck had been added, and the tram was sold again to Cambridge Street Tramways, becoming their number 7. The Cambridge system closed in 1914, and the vehicles were sold at auction. Tram number 7 became a workshop extension to a bungalow in Ely, where it remained until it was rescued in 2003 by the museum. The vehicle was renovated between 2012 and 2019, assisted by a grant from the Heritage Lottery Fund, and its previous history became apparent as the layers of paint were stripped away.

== Proposal to re-introduce ==
In 2006 a private group Trams for Bath proposed their re-introduction. In 2015 a further initiative was under discussion by a new group Bath Trams.

In 2017 Bath and North East Somerset council announced it was to carry out a feasibility study of a light rail system. The study was produced by Atkins, and in January 2018, Bath Council identified four routes which could have tram routes and identified that the proposals would need further consideration.

== Bibliography ==
- Baber, Andrew (16 January 2018). "Bath tram study identifies four corridors where 'there is a case for further consideration'". Bath Chronicle. Archived from the original on 19 January 2018.
- Klapper, Charles F. (1974). The Golden Age of Tramways (2 ed.). David & Charles. ISBN 978-0-7153-6458-1.
- Oppitz, Leslie (1990). Tramways Remembered-West & South West England. Countryside Books. ISBN 978-1-85306-095-3.
- Prior, Gareth (6 October 2013). "Second hand Cambridge horse tram is third hand!". British Trams Online. Archived from the original on 4 May 2014.
- Prior, Gareth (27 May 2019). "Cambridge Horse tram 7 almost complete". British Trams Online. Archived from the original on 7 June 2019.
