= Bradford Corporation Tramways =

Former Tramway Network in Bradford, England

Bradford Corporation Tramways were a tramway network in the city of Bradford, West Riding of Yorkshire, England which operated trams from 1882 until 1950 and trolleybuses from 1911 until 1972. The track gauge of the tramways was 4 ft (1,219 mm).

== History ==
=== Origins ===
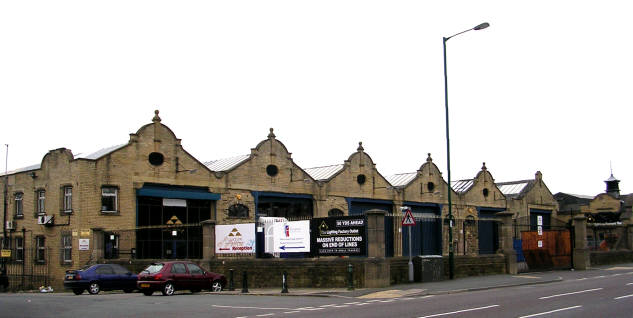
Former tram sheds in Thornbury

Bradford Corporation had gained parliamentary approval under the Bradford Corporation Tramways Order 1880 to construct a tramway system in the city. Construction of the first section of single-line track tram line on Manningham Lane started in September 1881. The finished line ran from Rawson Square in the city centre to Lister Park Gates. Since at that time local councils were not allowed to operate their own tramway system, the line was leased to the Bradford Tramways Company (later the Bradford Tramways and Omnibus Company). The line was opened to the public after a Board of Trade inspection took place on 31 January 1882. The first service ran at 8 am on 2 February 1882. The first additional line opened on 8 August 1882 along Leeds Road to Stanningley and was operated using steam traction because of the gradients involved. A further other radial line, also steam operated, was built to Tong Cemetery, Allerton via Four Lane Ends, and the horse-drawn line was extended from Manningley to Undercliffe. Another new line was constructed in 1884 from the Town Hall Square to Shelf, together with a branch line from Odsal to Wyke. Although the Bradford Tramways and Omnibus Company was offered the operating lease, it did not show sufficient interest. The corporation therefore invited offers and leased the new line to the newly formed Bradford and Shelf Tramways Company for 19 years. This lease expired on the same date (31 January 1903) as those of the Bradford Tramways and Omnibus Company.

When the Light Railways Act 1896 (59 & 60 Vict. c. 48) removed the prohibition on local authorities operating their own tramways, Bradford Council constructed and operated its own electric tramway. On 30 July 1898 an electrified line to Bolton Junction opened, and a line to Great Horton on 27 August 1898.

=== Consolidation and extension ===
An expansion of the tramway network was prepared by laying more tracks. A comprehensive system could, however, not be developed until the leases of the Bradford Tramways and Omnibus Company and of the Bradford and Shelf Tramway Company expired. The corporation obtained therefore statutory powers to terminate the companies' leases before their expiry date, and purchased them on 1 February 1902, after which date both tramway companies went into liquidation. Some of the steam engines and cars from the former tramway companies were hired until the electric system was fully operational. The horse trams on the Manningham Lane line were retired on 31 January 1902. In 1903 steam services on the former Bradford and Shelf Tramway lines ceased, and the Bradford tramway system became fully electrified.

By 1905, there were demands from the public for trams to run between Bradford and Leeds, despite the fact that Bradford used a gauge of 4 ft (1,219 mm) and the Leeds system used the 4 ft 8 1/2 in (1,435 mm) standard gauge. Christopher John Spencer was the general manager at the time, and with his engineer J. W. Dawson, designed wheel sets where the wheels were mounted on a splined axle, allowing the wheels to move outwards when heading for Leeds, and to move inwards when heading for Bradford. A special length of transition trackwork was laid in Town Street, Stanningley, and staff from both systems met on the night of 22 January 1907 to test the system, by travelling from Thornbury to Bradford, and then back to Armley. Further trials took place, fares were agreed, and a batch of new variable gauge tramcars were built. The through service began on 7 June 1909, and ran until the middle of the First World War, when maintenance issues resulted in through running being withdrawn.

The Mid-Yorkshire Tramway Company of Shipley was purchased in 1904 and incorporated into the Bradford system. The last extension from Bingley Post Office to Crossflatts was opened in 1914.

=== Introduction of trolleybuses ===
Where the population of an area was too small to warrant a tramway service, bus services were established. Bradford had given preference to the trolleybus over the motor bus, and after inspection of several European systems, a first trolleybus service was opened between Laisterdyke and Dudley Hill on 20 June 1911. Although R. Wilkinson, the transport department manager around 1920, favoured the trolleybus as a replacement for the tramway, the Transport Committee decided to retain the tramway system. Nevertheless, the trolleybus fleet was increased and modernised over the years, and further trolleybus lines were opened, such as services to Odsal to Oakenshaw (1914), Bolton Woods and Frizinghall (1915), Clayton (1926), Allerton (1929), Saltaire via Thackley (1930), Greengates via Idle (1931), Duckworth Lane (1935), Tong Cemetery (1938), Saltaire, Bingley and Crossflatts (1939), Bradford Moor (1949), Wibsey (1955), Buttershaw (1956) and Holme Wood (1960).

=== Motor bus services ===
After short-lived trials of motor bus services in 1897 and from 1900 to 1902, licenses to operate private motorbuses on 14 services in Bradford were granted on 17 May 1926. The corporation had obtained similar powers through the Bradford Corporation Act 1925, but the use of their buses was initially restricted to the city. The first scheduled bus service of the corporation started from Lister Park to Bankfoot on 13 May 1926 in deliberate competition with a local operator who ran buses in competition with the tramways.

In 1926 bus services started to Bierley and Fagley, in 1927 to Little Horton from Duckworth Lane, to Horton Bank Top from Bankfoot, and to Tong, and after the Bradford Corporation Act 1928 had authorised the operation of Bradford buses outside the city limits, in 1928 to Greengates, Leeds and Tyersal. Motor buses were first used as replacement for tramway services on 16 April 1928 between Undercliffe and Greengates, and by 1935 more tramway routes had been replaced by buses.

=== Decline of the tramway system ===
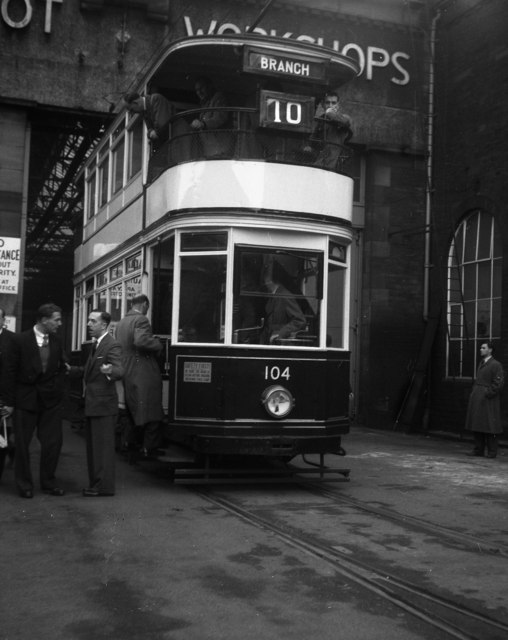
Last Bradford tramcar in Thornbury depot

While investment in the tramway continued in the 1920s, a strike by tramways staff in 1926 had allowed private bus operators into the city and highlighted the shortcomings of the tramway system. When worn tramway tracks were due for repair in 1928, a replacement of the tram by trolleybuses was suggested, which was to cost only one quarter of the cost of completely renewing the track. Although the official policy still provided for all three forms of transport in Bradford, plans were already made to replace the tramcars. The Allerton tram line was replaced by trolleybuses in 1919, causing some older tramcars to be withdrawn. In 1930 the trams on the Thackley and Saltaire route were replaced by trolleybuses, and by 1931 construction of tramcars had ceased. Much of the tram system had closed in 1939, and the remainder was to be abandoned in the following years. The onset of World War II delayed the plans. Motor bus services were affected by restrictions in fuel, while the tram and trolleybus services continued normally. After the war, the remaining tram lines were closed, and the last Bradford tramcar (No. 104) returned to Bankfoot depot for the final time on 6 May 1950.

=== From trolleybuses to motor buses ===
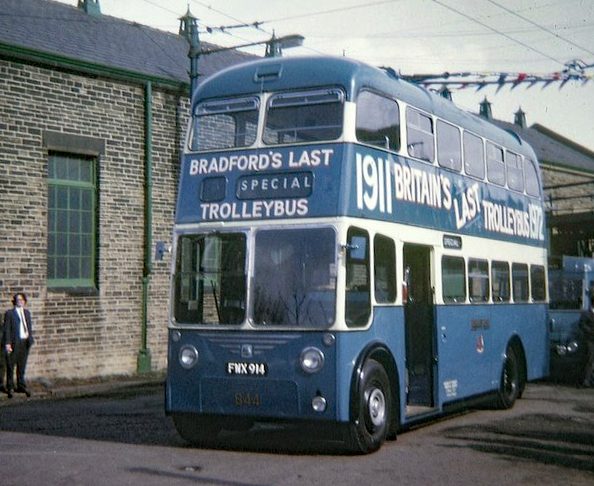
Last Bradford trolleybus in Thornbury depot

The undertaking changed its name to Bradford City Transport in 1952. The Bradford trolleybus system covered 47 route miles and operated 200 vehicles at its peak. An increased diesel fuel duty in 1952, coupled with a decrease in electricity costs, meant that trolleybuses were more economical to operate than motor buses. By 1962 the position had been reversed, so that the Transport Committee voted to replace the trolleybuses by the more flexible motor bus. In March 1961 the trolleybuses on the City to Bradford Moor route were withdrawn, followed by those on the Eccleshill to St. Enoch's Road route in November 1962. In 1967 less than 100 trolleybuses remained in service, and No. 844, the last trolleybus to carry fare paying passengers in Bradford, and also the last in Britain, returned to Thornbury depot on Sunday, 26 March 1972, for the last time. Bradford City Transport was absorbed into West Yorkshire Passenger Transport Executive on 31 March 1974.

== Fleet details ==
=== Bradford Tramways and Omnibus Company ===
The first cars of Bradford Corporation Tramways were six horse-drawn open-top 38-seat double-deckers numbered 1 to 6. These were built by Ashbury of Manchester to Eades' reversible patent. The steam engines of the line to Stanningley were built by Kitson of Leeds, and the first trailer cars were converted from the Ashbury-built horse cars. G. F. Milnes & Co. supplied new trailer cars.

=== Bradford and Shelf Tramways Company ===
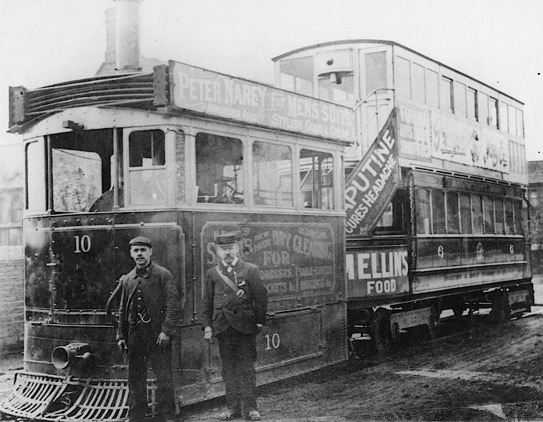
Steam locomotive N° 10 of Bradford and Shelf Tramways Company built by Thomas Green & Son Ltd (ex Smithfield Ironworks) based on William Wilkinson's patent (registered in 1881) with numbers corresponding to the orders from 1 to 12

The first five steam engines of the Bradford and Shelf Tramways Company were built by Thomas Green & Son of Leeds and supplemented by six Starbuck-built 58-seat double-deck trailers.

=== Bradford Corporation Tramways ===
Sixteen Brush-bodied open-top double-deck cars (nos. 1–16) were taken into service in 1898, eight similar tramcars (nos. 17–24) and four trailer cars (nos. 25–28) were delivered in 1899.

The first two trolleybuses were built upon Railless single-deck chassis with Hurst Nelson B28R bodies and numbered 240 and 241.

Bradford Corporation eventually decided to have its own vehicles (both tramcars and trolleybuses) built. The first Bradford Corporation tram (No. 210) built on Brush 21E bogies entered service in 1912, and during the next few years over 150 cars were built at the corporation's Thornbury Works. Between 1913 and 1918, an improved series of single-deck trolleybuses was also built there for the corporation, and Britain's first top-covered double-deck trolleybus underwent trials in 1920.

=== Preservation ===
At least one of the tramway cars built by Starbuck Car and Wagon Company survives. A single deck vehicle was built by Starbuck in 1880 for the Bath Tramways, and bought by Bradford in 1884, presumably for use as a trailer car. An upper deck was fitted, but in 1894, the vehicle was sold again to Cambridge Street Tramways, where it worked as horse tram number 7 until the demise of that system in 1914. It was sold at auction when the system closed, and became a workshop extension to a bungalow in Ely, where it remained until it was bought for preservation by Ipswich Transport Museum. Work began on restoring it in 2012, partly funded by a Heritage Lottery Fund grant, and its previous history became apparent as the paintwork was stripped away.

== See also ==
- Gauge Change Train
- Variable gauge

== Bibliography ==
- Croft, D J (1976). Bradford Tramways. Oakwood Press. ISBN 978-0-85361-181-3.
- King, J S (1995). Bradford Corporation Motorbuses. Venture Publications. ISBN 978-1-898432-51-7.
- King, J S (1999). Bradford Corporation Tramways. Venture Publications. ISBN 978-1-898432-80-7.
- King, J S (1994). Bradford Corporation Trolley Buses. Venture Publications. ISBN 978-1-898432-03-6.
- Klapper, Charles (1974). The Golden Age of Tramways. David & Charles. ISBN 978-0-7153-6458-1.
- Prior, Gareth (27 May 2019). "Cambridge Horse tram 7 almost complete". British Trams Online. Archived from the original on 7 June 2019.
