= Ipswich to Felixstowe Run =

Vehicle parade in Suffolk, England

The Ipswich to Felixstowe Run is an annual event in the English county of Suffolk. Up to 500 vehicles can participate in the event, starting in Christchurch Park, Ipswich. The vehicles make a 10-mile (16 km) journey to the promenade of Felixstowe, where they line up and remain there for a large part of the day. From 2015, a vehicle must be over 31 years old to participate. This event attracts many people to view the spectacle. The event is held on the first Sunday of May. It is organised by Ipswich Transport Museum, all helping are volunteers from the museum.

The vehicles can be seen at Christchurch Park from 0930 until 1130 and will start to arrive in Felixstowe at 1300 and will leave in the late afternoon.

The event was cancelled in both 2020 and 2021 due to the COVID-19 pandemic. It returned in 2022 for its 50th anniversary, with 600 participating vehicles.
