= Cambridge Crown Court =

Judicial building in Cambridge, England

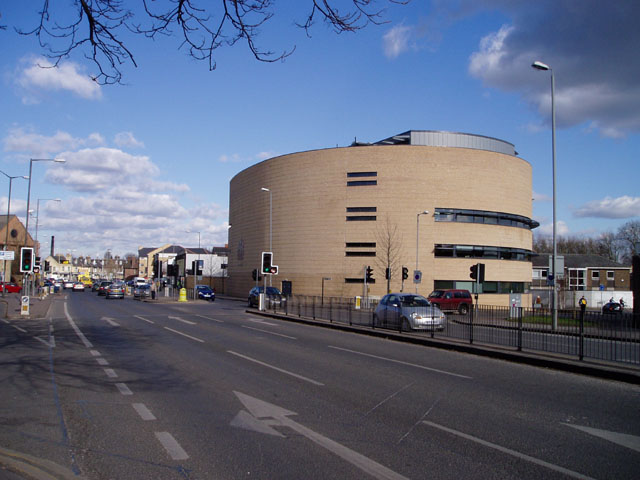
- Cambridge Crown Court

- Shown in Cambridgeshire
- 52.2069°N 0.1368°E
- Location: East Road, Cambridge

History
- Built: 2004

Site notes
- Architect: Austin-Smith:Lord
- Architectural style: Modern style

Cambridge Crown Court is a Crown Court venue which deals with criminal cases at East Road, Cambridge, England. It was completed in 2004.

== History ==
Until the early 21st century, crown court hearings were held in the Cambridge Guildhall. After the judicial facilities in the guildhall were deemed to be inadequate, the Lord Chancellor's Department decided to commission a new courthouse: the site chosen had originally accommodated a row of shops as well as a public house known as the "Wheelwright's Arms", which closed in 1960, and later accommodated Mackay's Garden Centre.

The new building was procured under a Private finance initiative contract in 2001. It was designed by Austin-Smith:Lord in the modern style, built by Mowlem and was opened on 7 June 2004. It was commissioned as a Tier 1 court centre, used for trial of serious offences including murder, with three courtrooms. The design involved a drum-shaped structure built in rusticated brick. There was a prominent Royal coat of arms mounted on the brick work on the west side and narrow bands of glazing on the east side. Internally, the building was laid out to accommodate three courtrooms.

Gareth Hawkesworth became resident judge in summer 2009. Jonathan Haworth is diversity and community relations judge for the court, and was formerly resident judge.

== Notable cases ==
Notable cases heard at the court include:

- September 2009 - Rekha Kumari-Baker was sentenced to life imprisonment with a minimum tariff of 33 years, for the murder of her two daughters. They were killed as they slept, Kumari-Baker stabbing them 69 times in total.
- November 2015 - Mark Mosley was sentenced to life imprisonment with a minimum tariff of 30 years, for the murder of fellow traveller Jessie Smith with a sawn-off shotgun after a New Year's Eve dispute. He was also convicted of attempted murder of another traveller, Paul 'Rambo' Smith.
- January 2018 - Korim 'Abdul' Ali & Abdul Salam 'Minnie' Ali, of Darwin Drive, Arbury, Cambridge, were sentenced at Cambridge Crown Court on 12 January 2018. Korim 'Abdul' was handed a life sentence and must serve a minimum of 23 years before he will be eligible for release from the parole panel after being found guilty of the murder of James Cromwell. He also received an 8 months sentence to serve concurrently for using a mobile phone in custody. Abdul Salam 'Minnie' Ali was handed a 3-year sentence for intimidating a witness and a concurrent sentence of 8 months for being party to illegal communications on a mobile phone. K & S Ali's mother, Nazna Begum, who said her son had been in the family home at the time he is alleged to have killed James Cromwell was not charged nor was K Ali's girlfriend, Korell Holley for supporting this false statement.
