= Gonville Place =

Street in Cambridge, England

Coordinates: 52.2007°N 0.12923°E

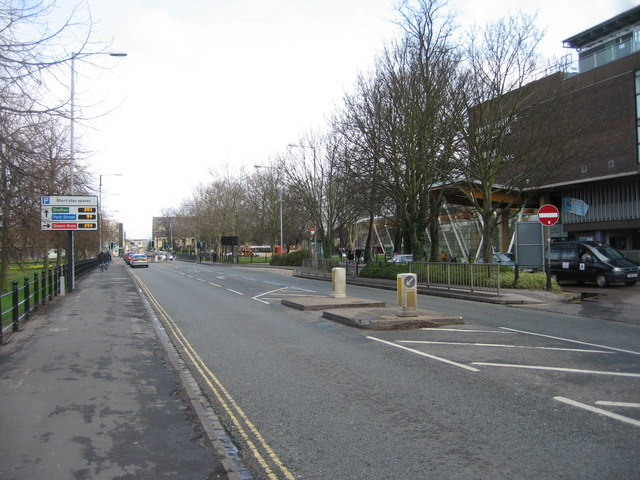
View along Gonville Place.

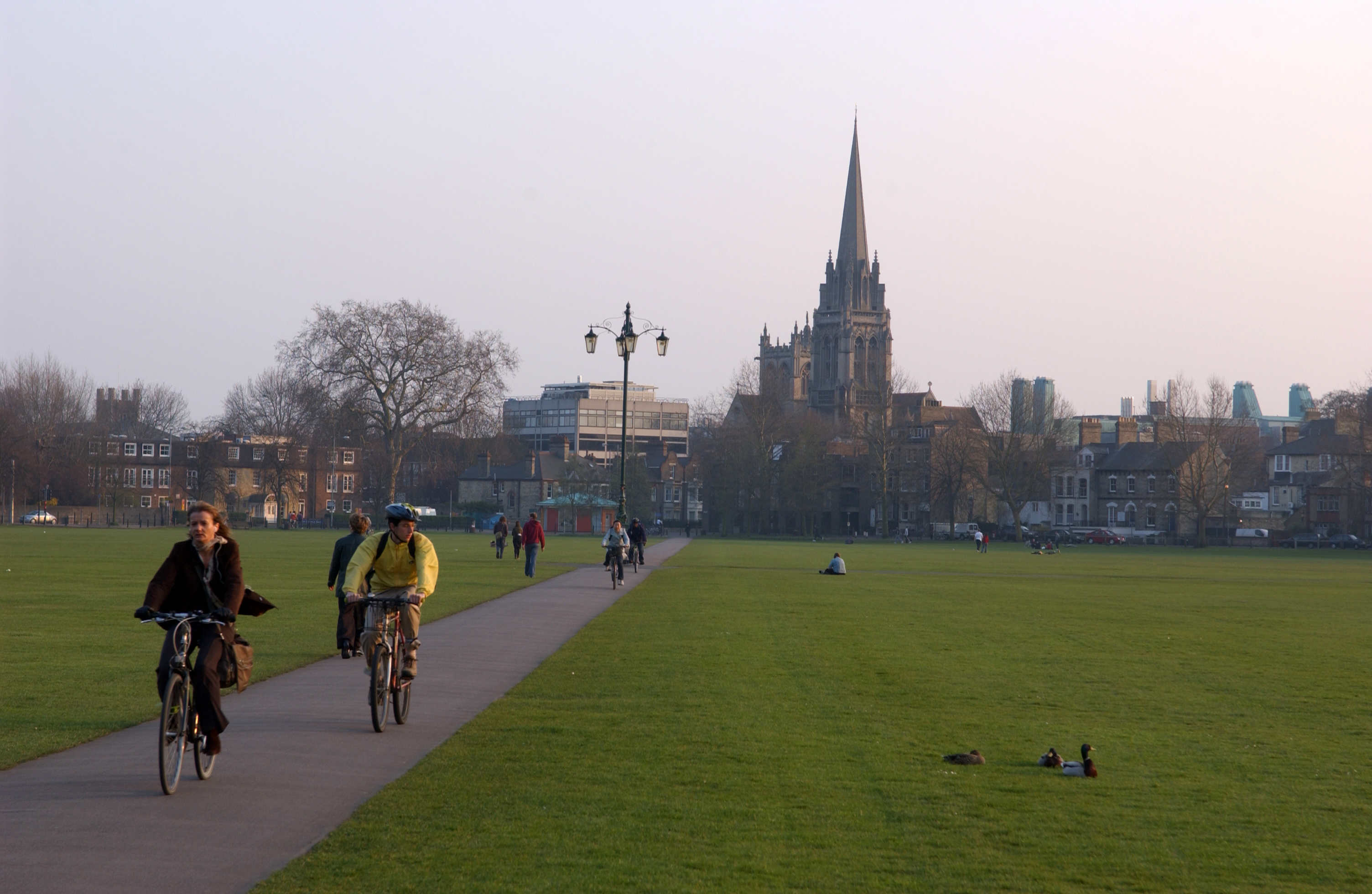
A view on Parker's Piece looking towards Our Lady and the English Martyrs Church, located on the opposite side of the junction of Hills Road with Gonville Place.

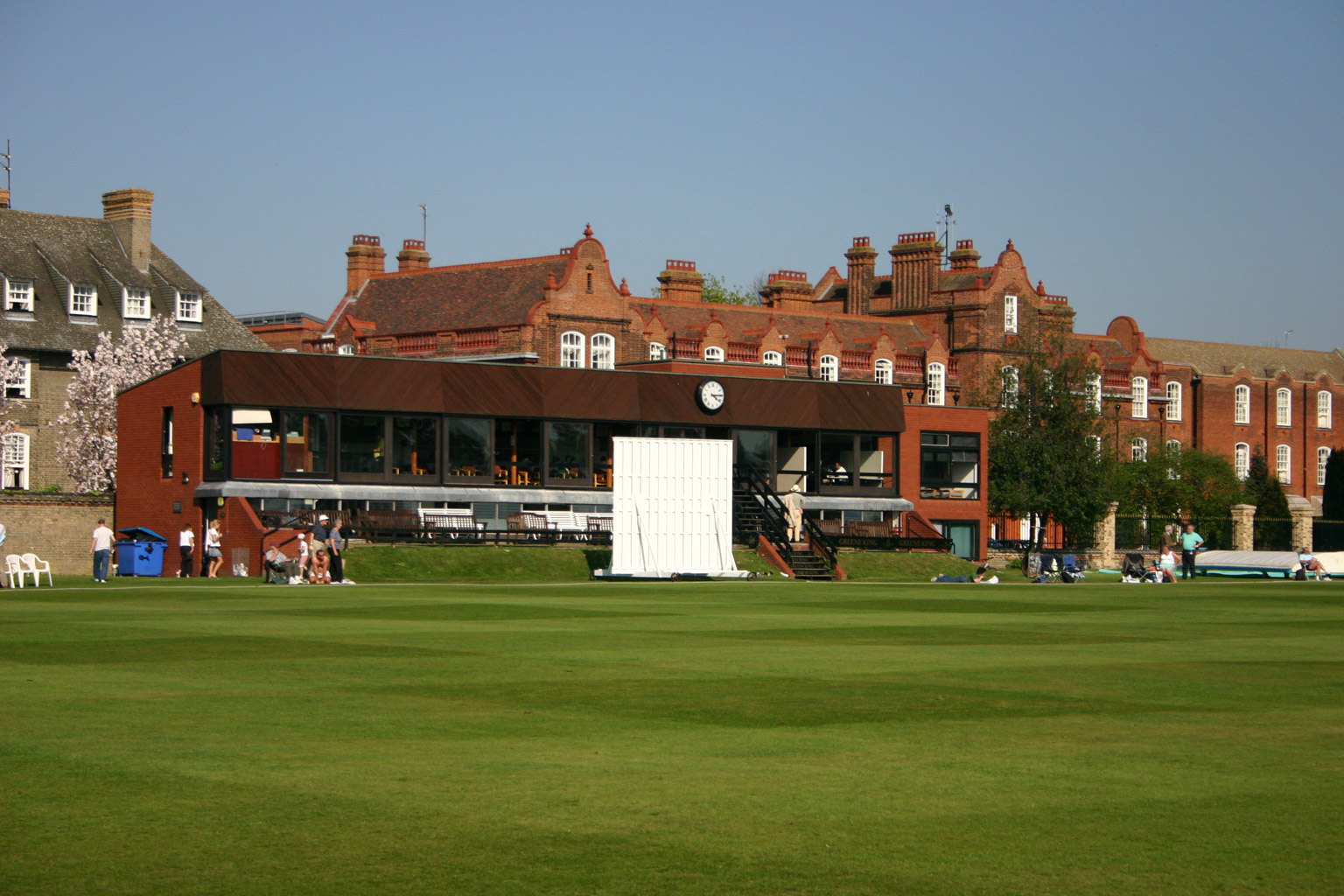
Fenner's, the University of Cambridge cricket ground, southeast of Gonville Place.

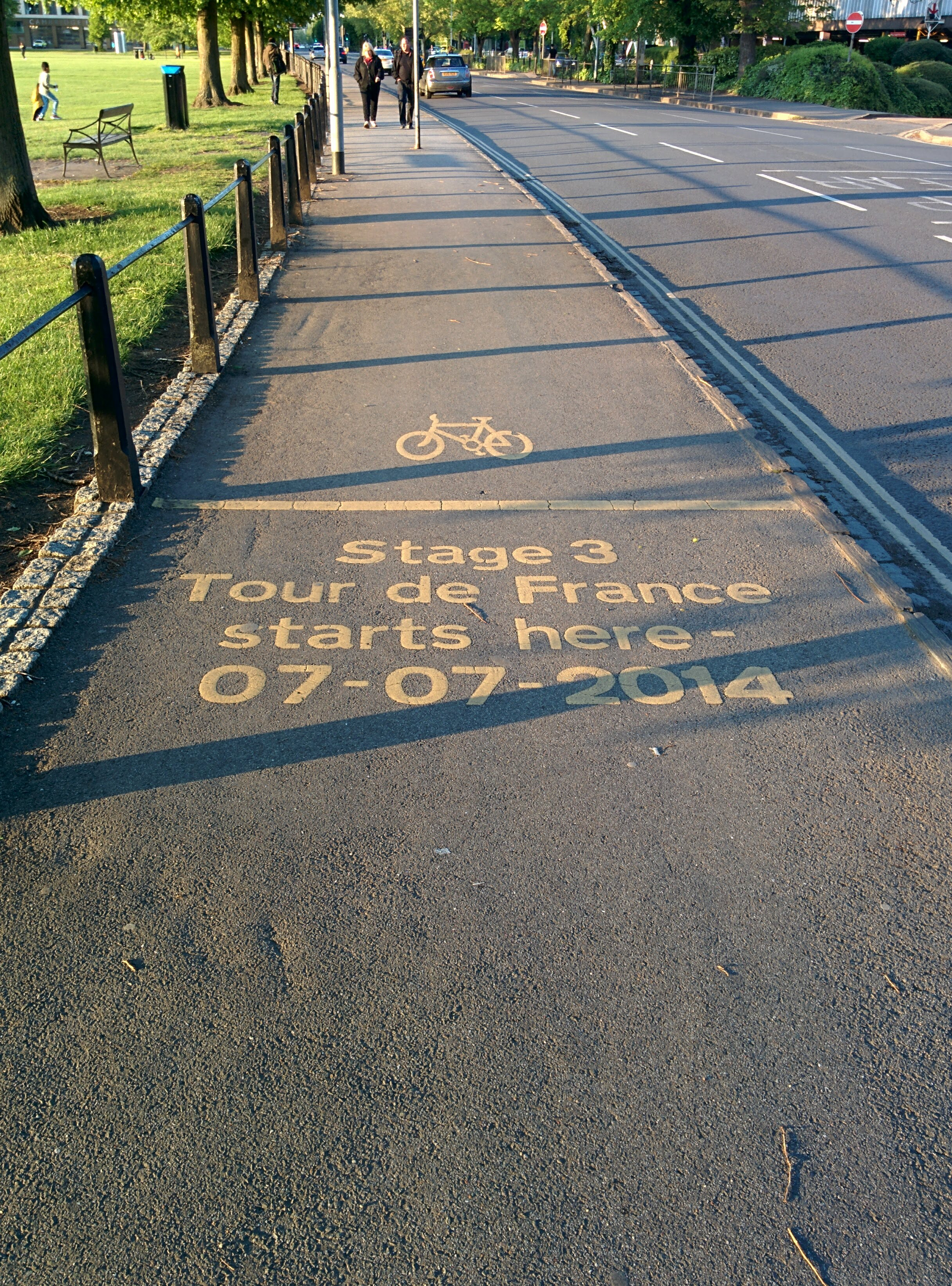
Pavement text in Gonville Place permanently marking the start of the Tour de France, 2014, Stage 3 (photographed in 2019)

Gonville Place is a road (part of the A603) in southeast central Cambridge, England. It forms part of the city's inner ring road. At the southwest end is the junction of Regent Street and Hills Road, where the road continues as Lensfield Road. At the northeast end is the junction of Parkside and Mill Road, where the road continues as East Road, a dual carriageway.

To the northwest is Parker's Piece, a large grassed area with footpaths. There are panoramic views of Parker's Piece from Gonville Place. The distinctive Parkside Pools indoor swimming pool building with a wavy roof was built 1998–99, with support from the United Kingdom National Lottery.

There is a YMCA on the southeast side of the road opposite Parker's Piece. Behind the YMCA is Fenner's, the cricket ground of the University of Cambridge, which has hosted first-class cricket since 1848. The Best Western Gonville Hotel is also located on the southeast side of Gonville Place, near the south corner of Parker's Piece.

There was little development around Gonville Place until the 19th century. The most important building along it in the early 19th century was the Cambridge Town Gaol. However, by the late 19th century, the construction of large houses with landscaped gardens meant that the street became a fashionable residential area. Some of these houses were replaced during the 1960s and 1970s. The street now forms part of the busy ring road, with the associated traffic problems that brings, especially for the many cyclists in the city.

A stage of the 2014 Tour de France started from Gonville Place.
