= Christchurch Park =

Public park in Ipswich, England

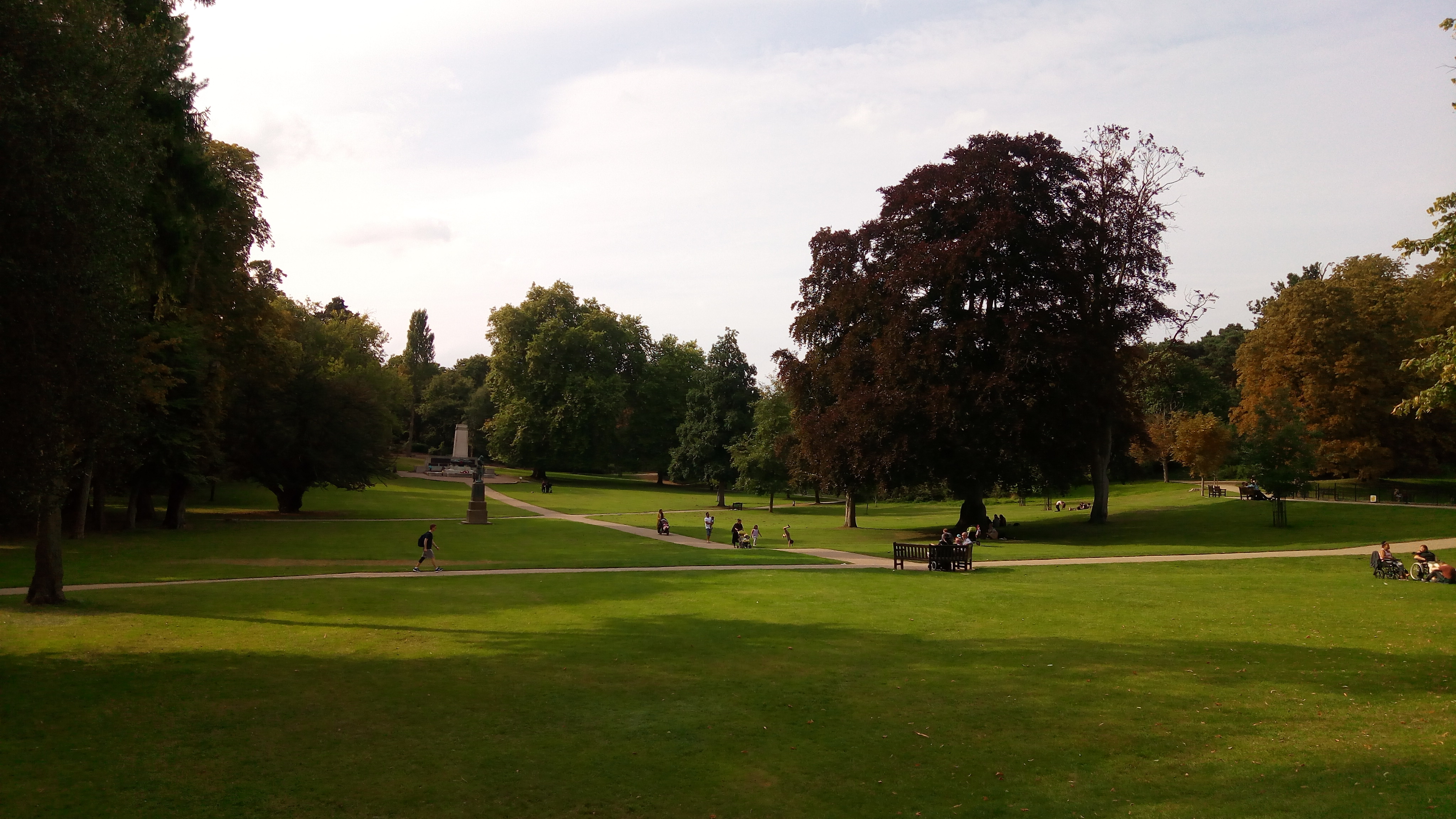
- Rolling lawns of Christchurch Park
- Interactive map of Christchurch Park
- Type: Public park
- Location: Ipswich; Suffolk; United Kingdom
- Coordinates: 52°03′48″N 1°09′22″E
- Area: 82 acres (33 ha)
- Operator: Ipswich Borough Council
- Status: Open year round
- Website: www.ipswich.gov.uk/services/christchurch-park

Christchurch Park is a historical area of rolling lawns, wooded areas, and delicately created arboreta close to the town centre in Ipswich, Suffolk. The park hosts various facilities such as a children's play area, tennis courts, table tennis, bowling greens and outdoor gym equipment. The distinguished Tudor house, Christchurch Mansion, is located at the parks southern entrance and holds a public museum and art gallery. The park belonged to various noble families as private land throughout its history but was purchased by the Ipswich Borough Council in 1894 and opened as the town's first public park in 1895.

== History ==
From the 12th century the park was the site of the Augustinian Priory of the Holy Trinity, Ipswich. In 1536 the Priory's estates were seized by the crown during Henry VIII's Dissolution of the Monasteries. The land was purchased by a London merchant, Paul Withypoll in 1545, and between 1548 and 1550 his son Edmund Withypoll had the priory demolished and built Christchurch Mansion in its place. The Mansion remains the impressive Tudor centrepiece of the park and contains a museum, art gallery and tea room.

During the 1560s there was an ongoing dispute with the Ipswich Corporation in relation to various alterations carried out and public access to the annual fair. In 1567 Edmund Withypoll constructed a new pond, now known as the 'Wilderness Pond'. Queen Elizabeth I stayed at the mansion for six days during August 1561. She returned to the town for four days in 1575.

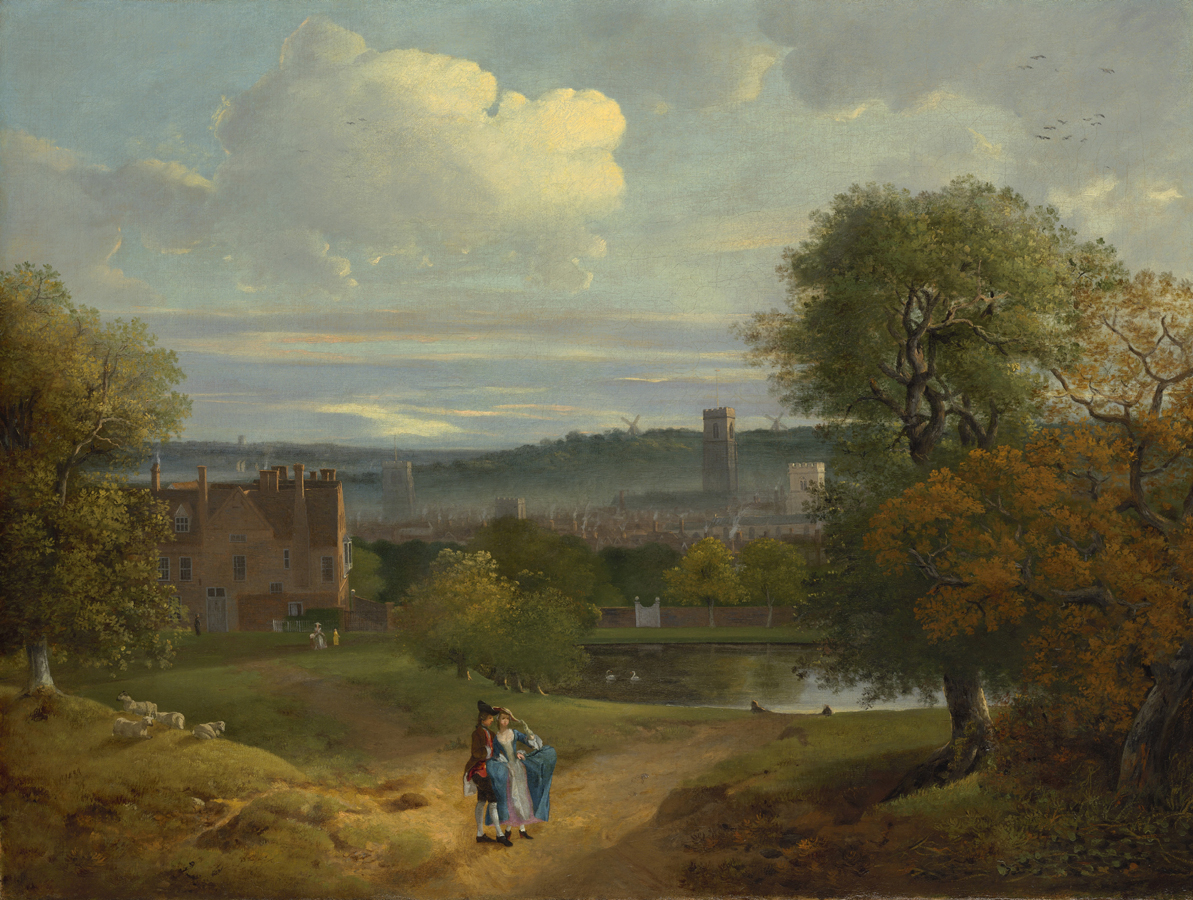
View of Ipswich from Christchurch Park by Thomas Gainsborough c. 1746–9

Edmund's granddaughter Elizabeth Withipoll married Leicester Devereux, 6th Viscount Hereford and the mansion passed to the Devereux family, who rebuilt the upper floors after a fire in about 1670, when the main porch was also added. Claude Fonnereau bought the Christchurch estate in 1734 which at the time totaled more than 114 acres (46 ha) of land (today's park covers about 82 acres (33 ha)). By 1772 the public were granted some access to the park and tried to introduce keys for those who would sign an agreement with conditions of entry.

Following efforts by the Ipswich Corporation to find land for a public park in 1848 W.C. Fonnereau leased 13 acres (53,000 m^{2}) to the corporation from 1851 who developed the arboretum in the same year that the park was visited by Prince Albert. By 1895 the mansion was owned by Felix Cobbold who offered to give it to the corporation on condition that the corporation purchased the rest of the grounds. A deal was concluded and the park opened to the public on 11 April 1895.

The park contains memorials to the Ipswich Martyrs which was installed in 1903. The war memorial to servicemen lost during the Boer War, World War I was moved to the park from cornhill in 1924. The corporation acquire the upper arboretum in 1928.

In 2004, the park received a £4.2 million grant from the Heritage Lottery Fund for a programme of extensive renovation and restoration of its facilities and historical features. This renovation included the 2006 draining of both the 'round' and 'wilderness' ponds in order to remove the five feet of silt that had collected over the previous 80 years.

== The park today ==
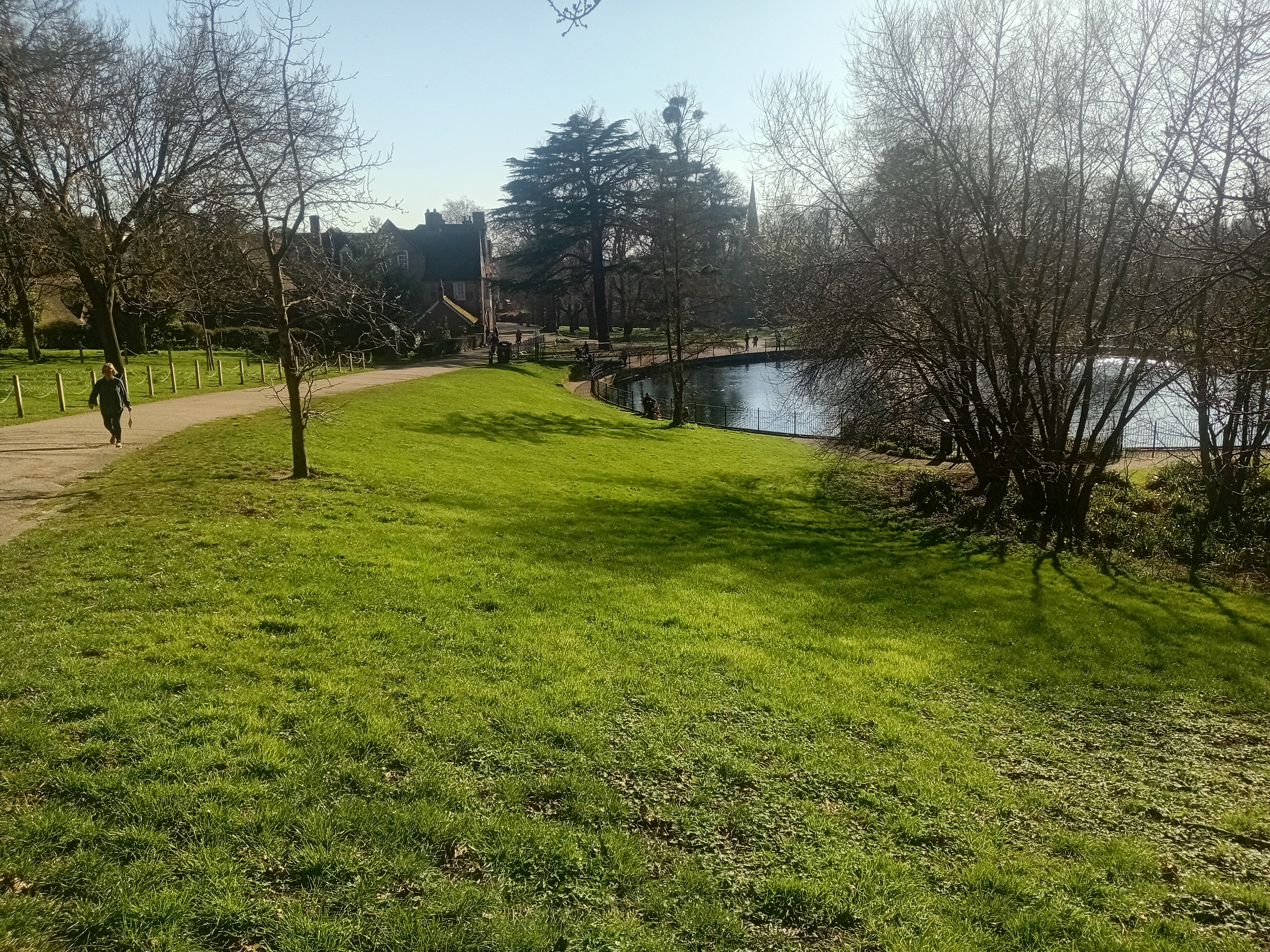
A 2026 recreation of "View of ipswich from christchurch park" by Thomas Gainsborough 1746

=== Arboreta ===
The Upper and Lower Arboreta within Christchurch Park are the horticultural gem of Ipswich providing inspiration to gardeners and a tranquil setting for relaxation and reflection. Just a few minutes from the town centre the formal gardens are planted with seasonal bedding displays, rose and shrub beds, an island herbaceous bed, formal carpet bedding and a large rockery. Paths gently weave through the gardens past tennis courts, croquet lawns and a band stand. Visitors will find ample seating and a large grass area for picnics.

==== The Upper Arboretum ====
The Upper Arboretum was opened as the first public park in Ipswich in 1853. It was envisaged as providing "healthful and harmonious recreation" by James Allen Ransome, a Councillor with Ipswich Municipal Council.

=== Wildlife and ornithology ===
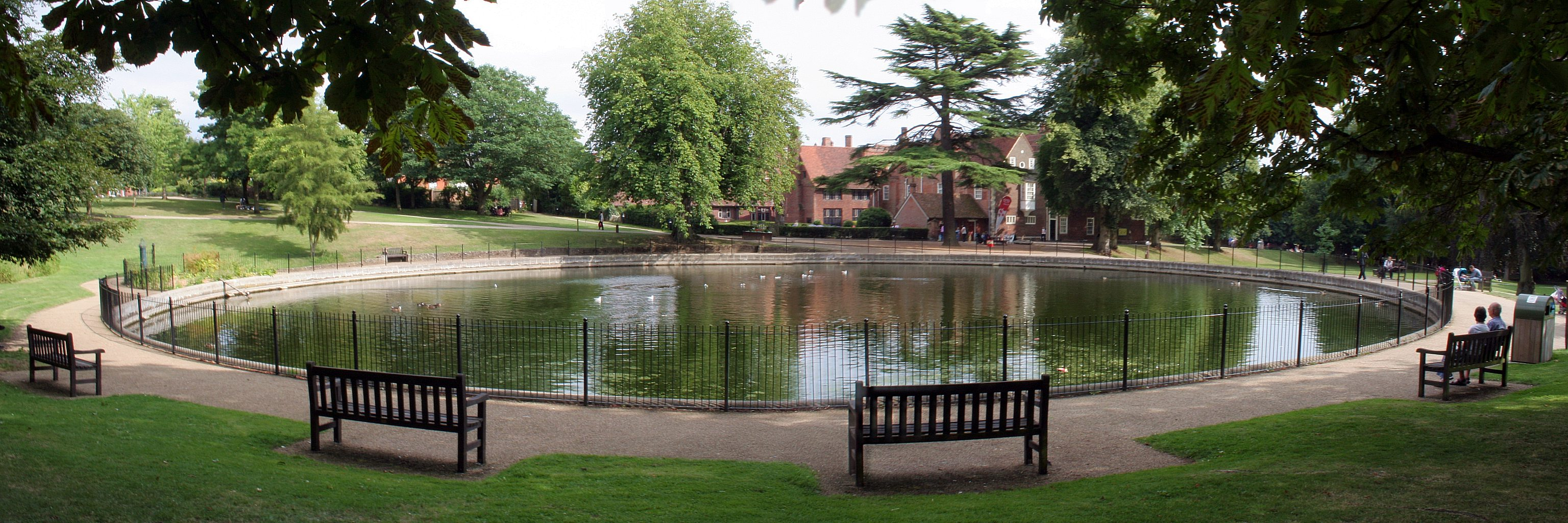
Stitched panorama of the round pond with the mansion in the background, in August 2013

Christchurch Park is home to in excess of 100 different bird varieties, including a large selection of ducks, geese and swans which inhabit the two large ponds situated within the park. Wilderness Pond is also home to a number of terrapins. A small bird reserve was set up in the early 1990s, and dog-walkers are restricted to keeping their pets on a lead within this area to reduce disturbances to the birds. Alongside the birds of the park, grey squirrels and a fox inhabit the arboreta. There is also a deer residing on the island in the wilderness pond.

=== Sport and leisure within the park ===
Sporting facilities within the park include tennis courts, a croquet lawn and a bowling green. Christchurch Park has also long been the centre of many of Ipswich's leisure and entertainment events. The Ipswich Carnival, a giant fireworks display, The Ipswich Flower Show and The Ipswich Music Festival are all held here, along with concerts from bands such as McFly, Busted, Diversity (Britain's Got Talent), Jedward, Jools Holland and Status Quo. Every summer, a "Proms in the Park" event is also held together with a screening of a popular film in the park's 'bowl', Snow Hill, prompting al fresco patriotism. An annual parade of historic vehicles also assembles along the spinal path of the park, and marks the start of the Ipswich to Felixstowe Run.

== Memorials in the park ==
=== Mayor's Walk ===
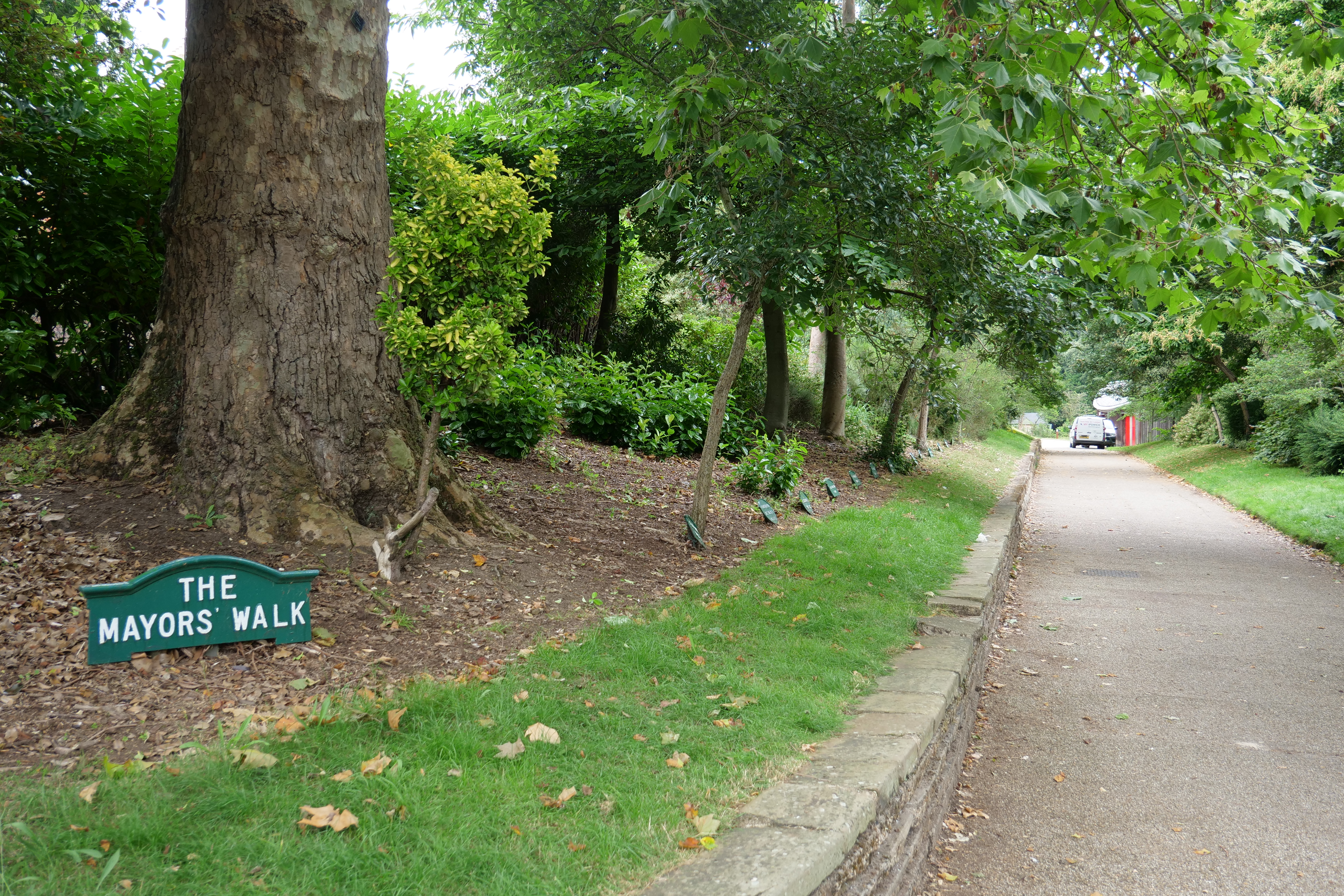
Mayor's Walk, August 2021

"Mayors' Walk" is a pathway in Christchurch Park, which has provided a permanent record of Ipswich mayors over the years.

== Gallery ==
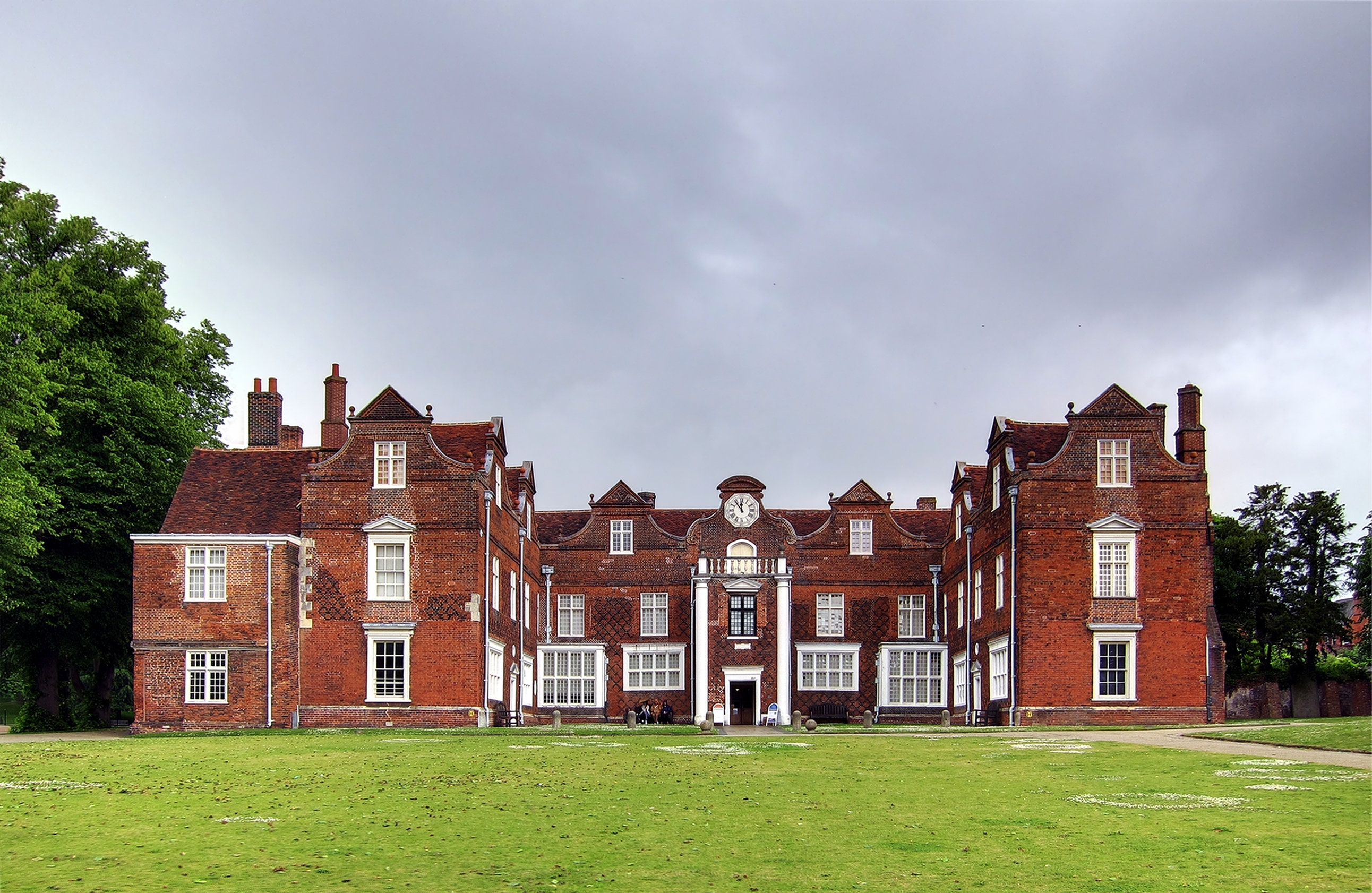
Christchurch Mansion

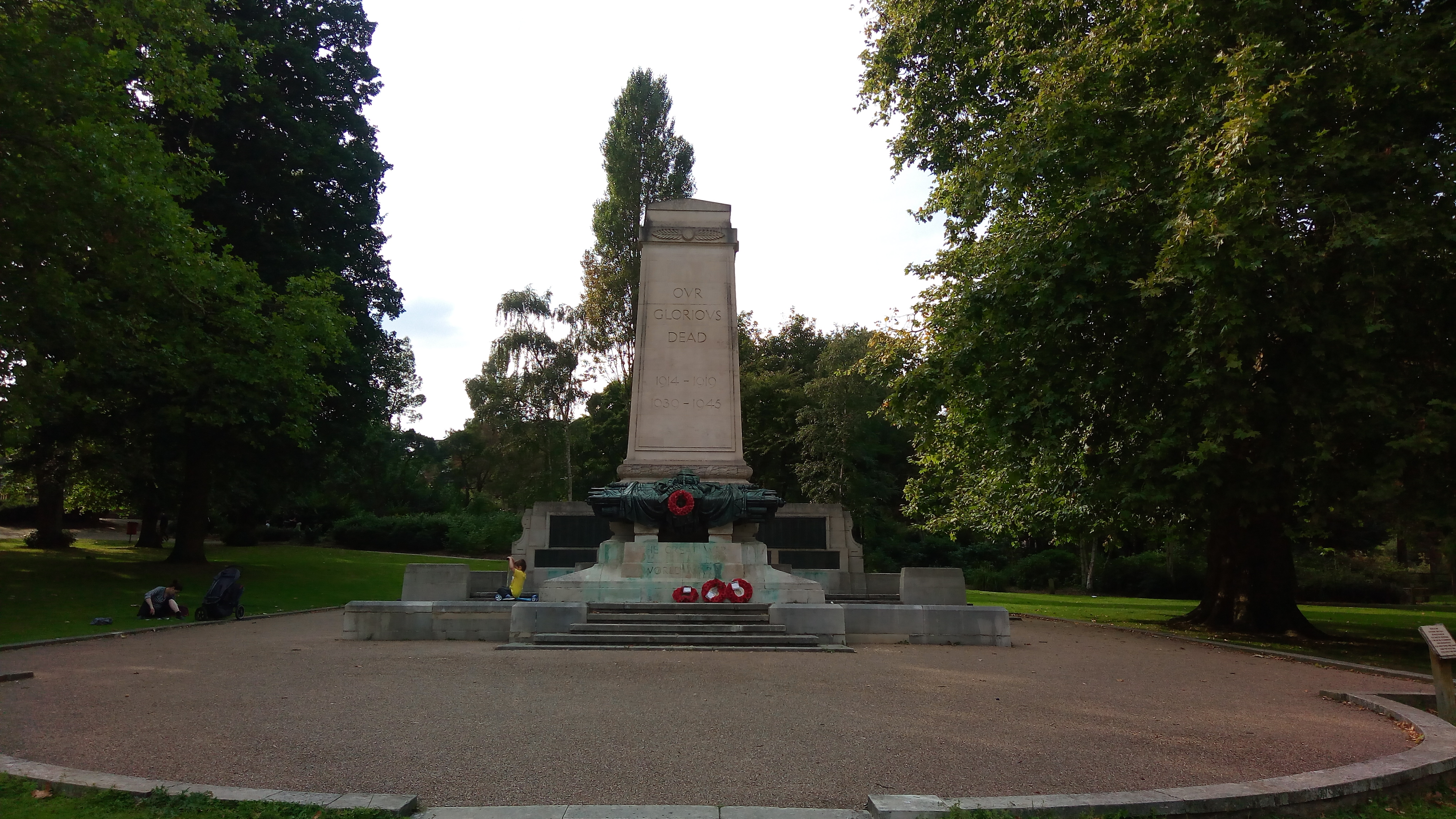
Christchurch Park War Memorial

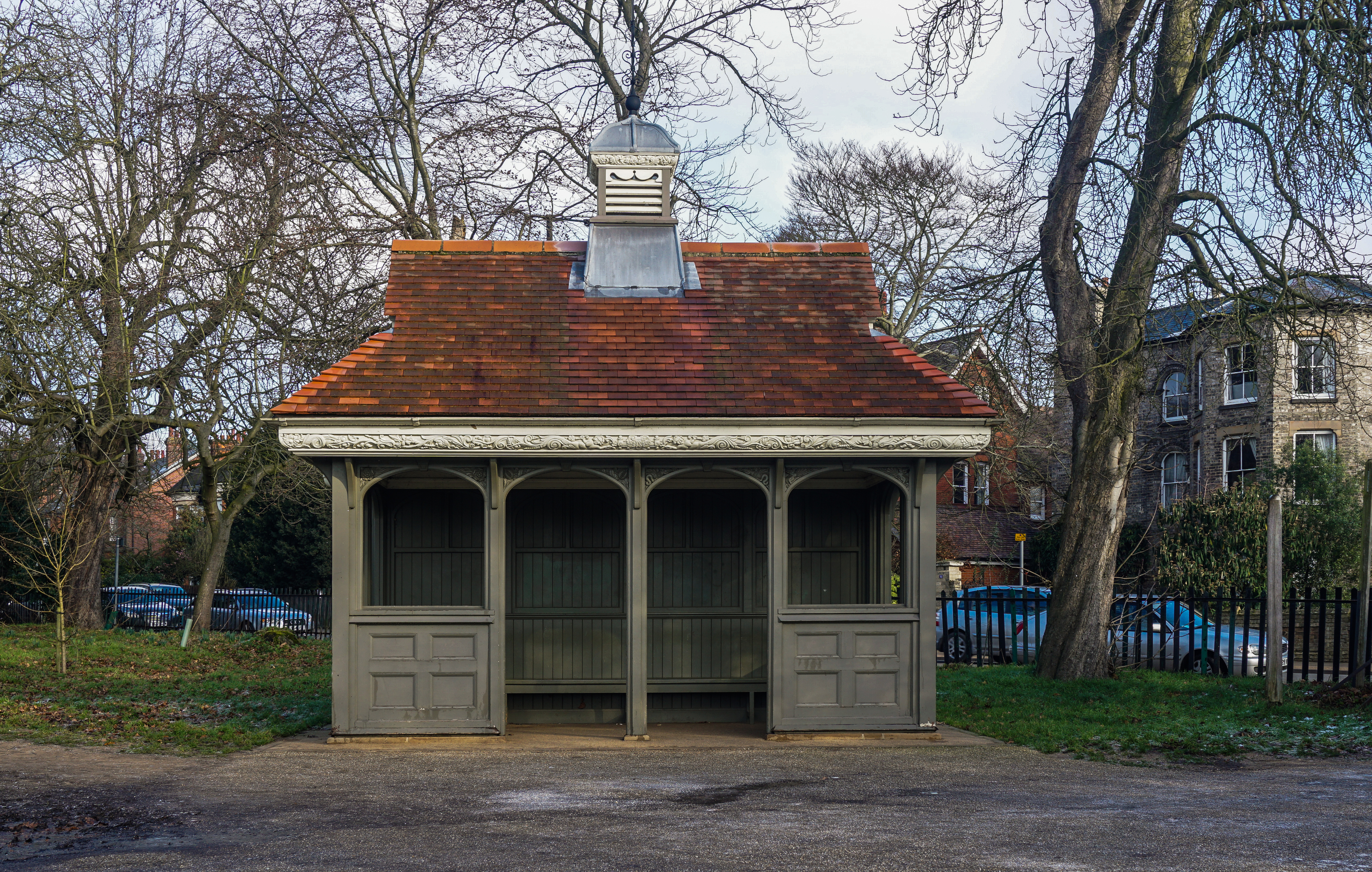
1892 built shelter for drivers of horse-drawn cabs was moved from Ipswich Cornhill and placed in the park in 1895.

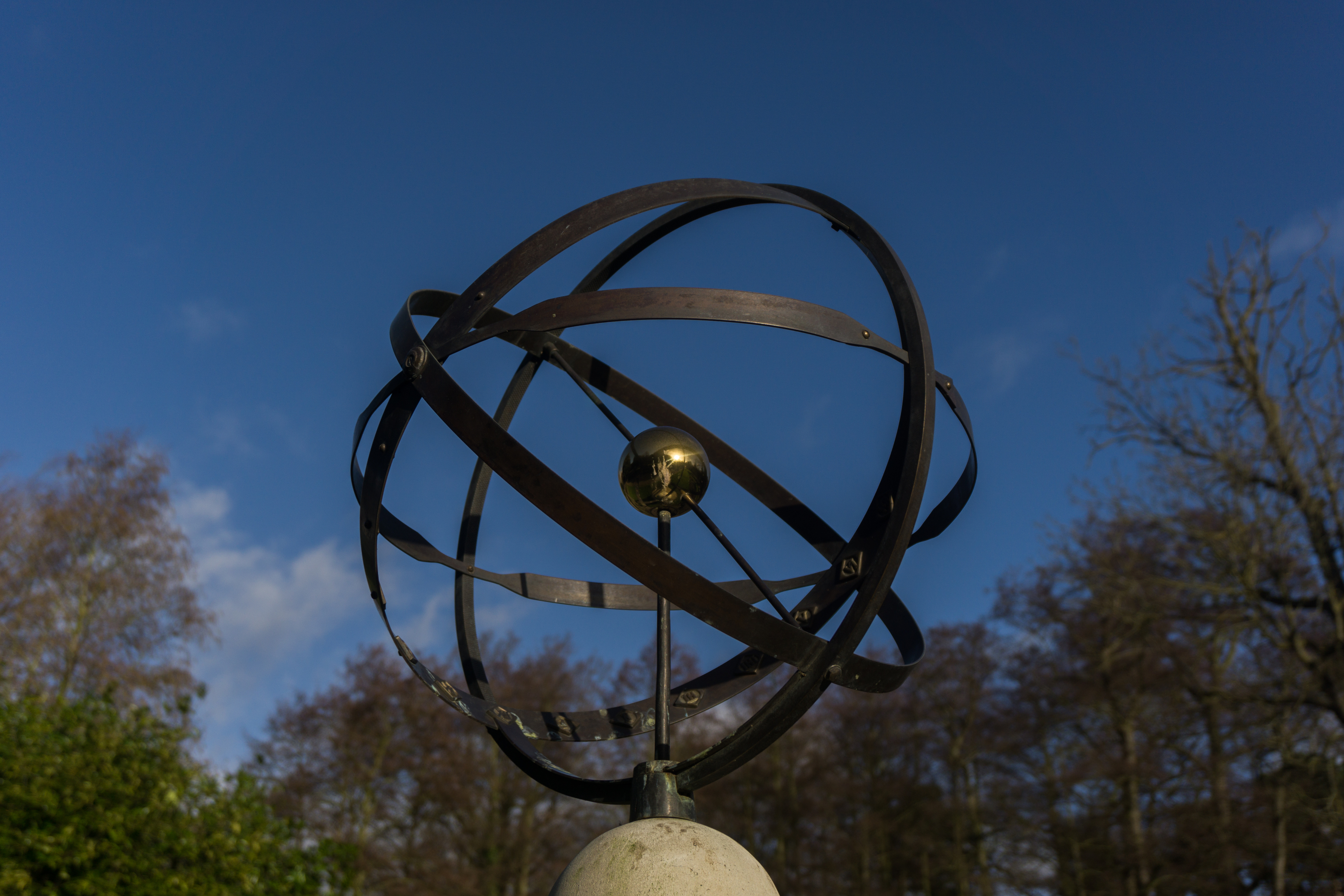
The Armillary Sphere Sundial

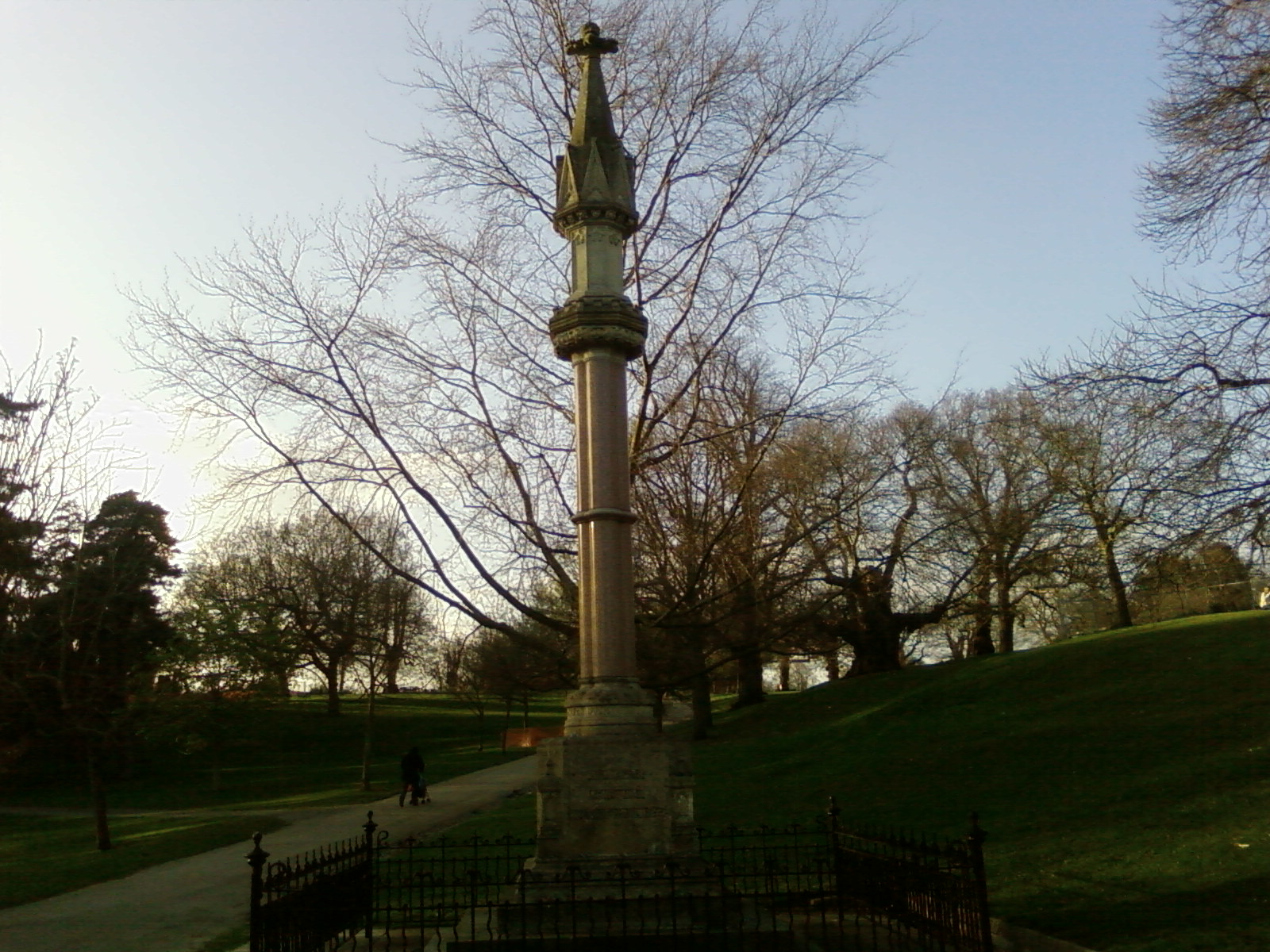
The Ipswich Martyrs monument at dusk
