= Gareth Hawkesworth =

(Walter) Gareth Hawkesworth (born December 1949) is a Circuit Judge who became "Resident Judge" at Cambridge Crown Court in summer 2009. Hawkesworth was appointed to his position as a Judge on the South Eastern Circuit on 29 September 1999.

Hawkesworth was called to the Bar (became a barrister) in 1972. He has worked with Cambridge Relate and Cambridge Neighbourhood Law Centre. He has been on the Legal Aid Committee and was appointed to the Parole Board in 2001 for three years.

In June 2012, Hawkesworth gave a non-custodial sentence to a 14-year-old boy for the rape of a 4-year-old girl; the sentence was criticised by the victim's family.

Hawkesworth was appointed to the ceremonial civic position of Honorary Recorder of Cambridge when the position was revived in 2013. The appointment was made following a unanimous vote of Cambridge City councillors.

== Works ==
- Hawkesworth, Gareth (1994). Victims of Crime. Eagle Legal Self Help Packs. London: HarperCollins. ISBN 1898434107.
