= East Road, Cambridge =

Road in Cambridge, England

Coordinates: 52°12′15″N 0°07′58″E

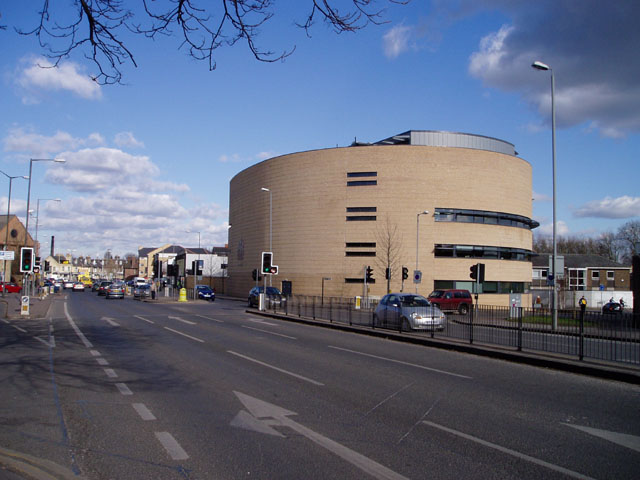
Cambridge Crown Court on East Road.

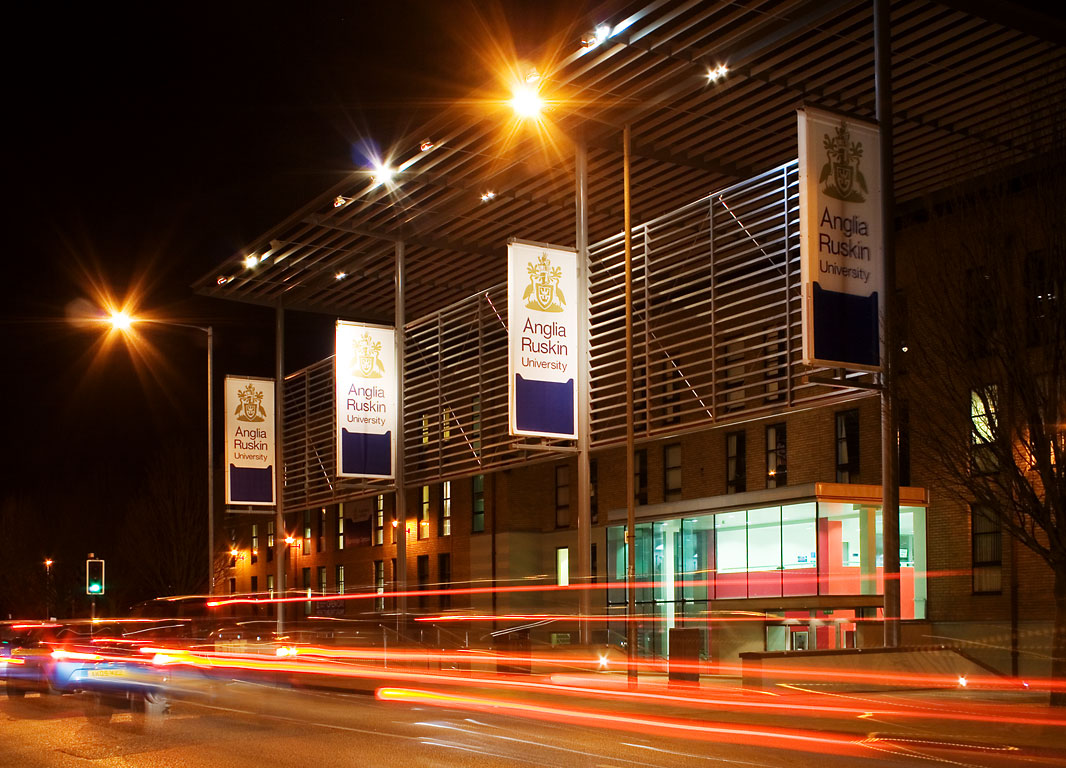
The main entrance to Anglia Ruskin University on East Road.

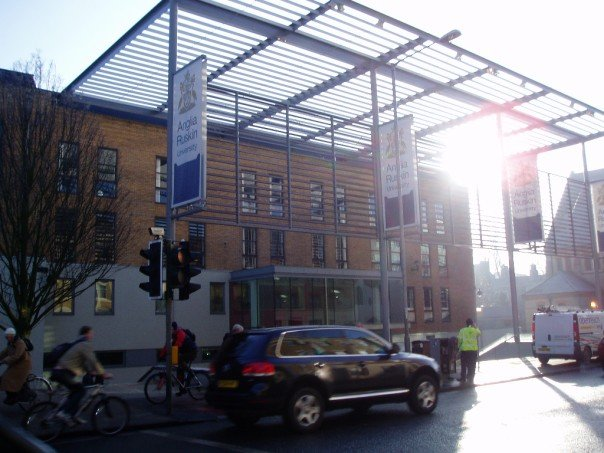
Anglia Ruskin University's Helmore Building, East Road.

East Road is a dual-carriageway road in the east of Cambridge, England. It is designated the A603 and forms part of Cambridge's inner ring road. The southwest end of East Road is next to Parker's Piece, at the junction with Parkside, Mill Road, and Gonville Place. At the northeast end there is a roundabout that links with Elizabeth Way (part of the A1134, continuing the inner ring road north) and Newmarket Road (also part of the A1134, leading east out of the city).

The Cambridge campus of Anglia Ruskin University is on East Road, north of Mill Road. The Ruskin Gallery, open to the public, is part of the Cambridge School of Art on the Anglia Ruskin University East Road campus.

The Cambridge County Court is on East Road. The distinctively round Cambridge Crown Court is also on East Road, at No 83, since 2004.
