= Vilnius–Klaipėda Railway =

Railway line in Lithuania

- Railway in Lithuanian rail system

Overview
- Termini: Vilnius railway station; Klaipėda railway station
- Stations: 10

Service
- Operator: Lithuanian Railways

Technical
- Line length: 376 km (233.64 mi)
- Track gauge: 1,520 mm (4 ft 11 27/32 in) Russian gauge
- Electrification: 25 kV 50 Hz AC
- Operating speed: 140 km/h (87 mph)

Vilnius – Klaipėda Railway (Lithuanian: Geležinkelis Vilnius – Klaipėda) is one of the main local railways in Lithuania. This railway connects the Lithuanian capital Vilnius with the country's biggest coastal city Klaipėda. It is the most actively used train line in Lithuania.

The train service from Vilnius to Klaipėda runs 5 times per day.

== History ==
In 2016, new Pesa 730ML DMUs were introduced on the Vilnius-Klaipėda route.

In 2022, the electrification of Vilnius-Klaipėda Railway project started with an estimated cost of 411.26 million euro. After the completion of the electrification project, carbon dioxide emissions from the line will be reduced by 150 thousand tonnes each year. Electrification was completed in 2026.

== Stations ==
Station	Picture	Opened	Connected to Vilnius–Klaipėda system	Connections	Location
Vilnius		1860	1871	Vilnius Airport, Vilnius–Marcinkonys Railway, Vilnius–Turmantas Railway, Vilnius–Kaunas Railway	54°40′13″N 25°17′4″E
Kaišiadorys		1871	1871	Vilnius–Kaunas Railway	54°53′11″N 23°55′53″E
Jonava		1871	1871	Jonava-Kaunas	55°5′35.43″N 24°16′32.96″E
Kėdainiai		1871	1871		55°18′34″N 23°58′39″E
Radviliškis		1871	1871	Radviliškis–Daugavpils Railway	55°48′20″N 23°32′12″E
Šiauliai		1871	1931		55°55′21.19″N 23°18′56.45″E
Telšiai		1932	1932		55°59′33.72″N 22°15′6.12″E
Plungė		1932	1932		55°55′8.76″N 21°51′7.2″E
Kretinga		1915	1932		55°55′8.76″N 21°51′7.2″E
Klaipėda		1881		Klaipėda–Pagėgiai Railway, Klaipėda–Skuodas Railway	55°43′15″N 21°8′5″E
