= Žasliai railway disaster =

1975 railway incident in Lithuania

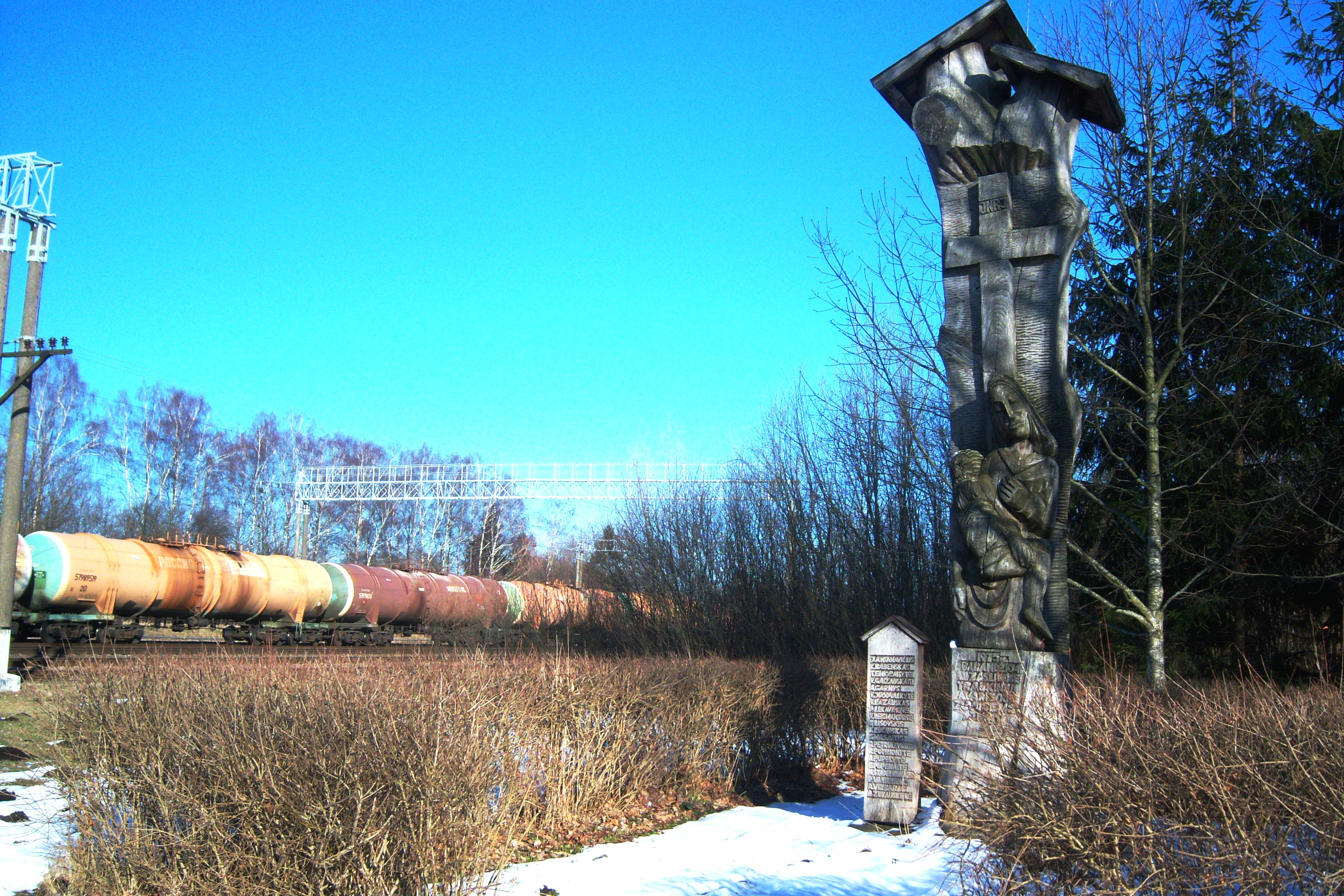
- Memorial with names of known victims

- Location of Žasliai train station in Lithuania

Details
- Date: 4 April 1975; 17:35
- Location: Žaslių GS
- Coordinates: 54°50′05″N 24°35′38″E
- Country: Lithuanian SSR
- Line: Vilnius–Kaunas Railway
- Operator: Lithuanian Railways
- Incident type: Derailment and fire
- Cause: Collision with a cargo train

Statistics
- Trains: 2
- Deaths: 20
- Injured: 80+

Žasliai railway disaster occurred on 4 April 1975 near Žasliai, Lithuanian SSR. A passenger train on Vilnius–Kaunas Railway hit a tank car carrying fuel. The passenger train derailed and caught fire. Soviet authorities suppressed the news of the disaster and there are persistent rumors that the official death toll of 20 dead and 80 injured is understated, but it remains the largest railway accident in Lithuania.

== Accident ==
In the evening of 4 April 1975, a crowded passenger train no. 513 traveled from Vilnius to Kaunas. It was Friday, a week after Easter, and many students from Vilnius were returning home for the weekend. At 17:35 local time, the train at a speed of 70 kilometres per hour (43 mph) hit a 60-tonne tank car of a cargo train. The cargo train no. 2719 of 93 tank cars was traveling from Paneriai railway station near Vilnius to Palemonas railway station near Kaunas at slower speeds and had to give way to the faster passenger train by moving to the side track at the Žasliai train station. However, its last car protruded too far into the live track. The cargo train carried fuel which leaked and caught fire. The first two cars (the locomotive and the first passenger car) of the passenger train derailed, while the third car got stuck in the tank car and suffered from particularly fierce flames. In total, there were four passenger train cars.

People tried to break windows and escape the burning train while locals organized help and vehicles to bring the injured to the nearest hospital in Kaišiadorys. In particular, many remember a pregnant woman whose hand was trapped under a rail car – local men managed to free her. Passenger Arvydas Garnys helped save three children, went back to help his friend, and died in flames. His body was not found after the fire. He was posthumously awarded the Medal "For Courage in a Fire". Many died either due to fire or smoke inhalation, but many more suffered various burns. In particular, people suffered severe burns when their synthetic clothes (especially, polyester raincoats and nylon stockings) melted onto their skin due to the heat. Firemen from Kaišiadorys, Elektrėnai, Jonava, Kaunas, Kėdainiai attempted to put down the fire, but it was extinguished only by military firemen some 15 hours later.

== Casualties ==
Soviet authorities suppressed the news of the disaster and provided only the basic information minimizing the number of victims. The first laconic information about the accident was published in Tiesa only two days later. On 9 April, another brief report claimed that a special commission had concluded the investigation and determined the responsible parties who would be prosecuted. The report quantified the casualties – 17 dead (15 at the site and two later in hospital) and 39 injured. Soviet authorities charged dispatcher Stasys Urbonavičius and foreman Motiejus Šiško and sentenced them to 13 and 3 years in prison, respectively, in August 1975. The court also ordered the men to reimburse property damages which were valued at 253,406 Soviet roubles. However, due to a mechanical malfunction, the signaling system did not alert the men that the cargo train was not fully moved off the live track. Therefore, railway workers sent a petition to the Soviet prosecutor's office asking for clemency. Urbonavičius was released from prison after serving seven years, returned to railroad work, and had 20% of his salary taken out for property damage reimbursement.

After the events, Soviet authorities claimed 17 deaths. After Lithuania regained independence in 1990, three more names became known, bringing the official death toll to 20. Their ages were from 19 to 40 and included a pregnant woman, who was also a relative of former president Kazys Grinius, and a sister of dissident and future politician Vidmantas Povilionis. But eyewitnesses claim that the death toll should be much higher. Due to the heat, bodies burned down to ashes and few bone fragments. Similarly, official Soviet sources listed only 39 injured, but the Kaišiadorys hospital alone registered 80 people and more people were brought to various hospitals in Kaunas, Vilnius, Elektrėnai or were administered first aid at the local clinic.

After Lithuania regained independence in 1990, the event became more widely known. On 31 August 1991, a wooden monument of pietà (wood carver Vidmantas Kapačiūnas) was unveiled at the location. It was organized by the parents of Arvydas Garnys who died in the accident. A small booklet describing the events was published by Jonas Laurinavičius, editor of a local newspaper, in 1991. At the same time, the press began publishing articles about the disaster.
