= Vilnius railway station =

Railway station in Vilnius, Lithuania

Vilnius
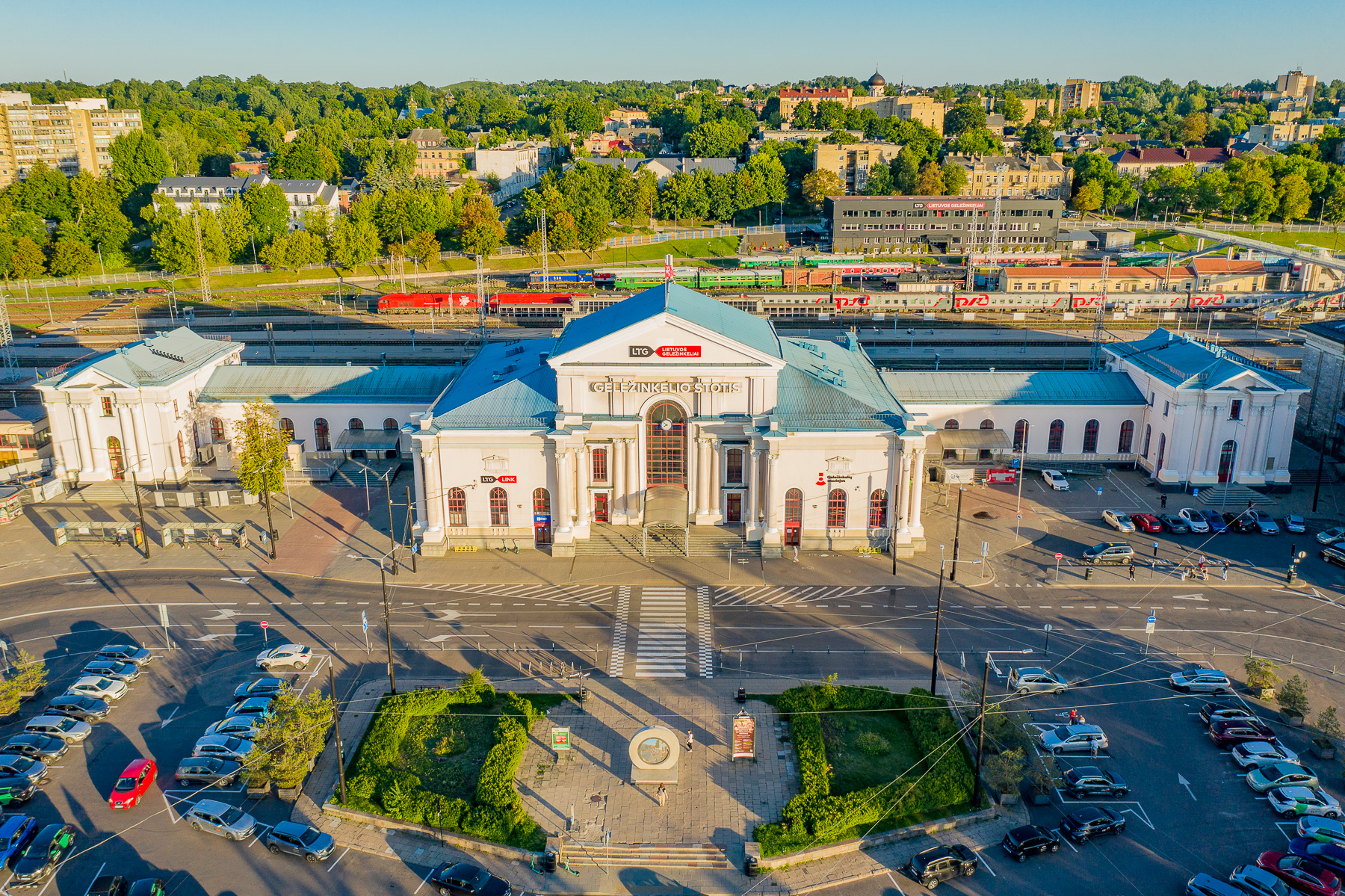
- Vilnius Central Railway Station entrance

General information
- Location: Geležinkelio g. 16; Vilnius; Lithuania
- Coordinates: 54°40′13″N 25°17′4″E
- Owner: LTG
- Operator: LTG Link
- Lines: Vilnius–Klaipėda Railway; Vilnius–Kaunas Railway; Vilnius–Marcinkonys Railway; Vilnius–Turmantas Railway; Vilnius–Jašiūnai Railway; Vilnius–Kena Railway
- Platforms: 6
- Tracks: 11

Construction
- Structure type: Waiting hall, ticket office, coffee shops, pharmacy, luggage storage, WC, LTG Link railway museum, ATM, vending kiosks.
- Accessible: Yes

Other information
- Website: ltglink.lt

History
- Opened: 1861
- Rebuilt: 1950

Services
Preceding station	LTG Link	Following station
Paneriai towards Kaunas	Vilnius–Kaunas	Terminus
Kaišiadorys towards Klaipėda	Vilnius–Klaipėda	Terminus
Vilnius Airport Terminus	Vilnius—Vilnius Airport	Terminus
Kirtimai towards Jašiūnai	Vilnius—Jašiūnai	Terminus
Kirtimai towards Trakai	Vilnius—Trakai	Terminus
Kirtimai towards Marcinkonys	Vilnius—Marcinkonys	Terminus
Terminus	Vilnius—Kena	Pavilnys towards Kena
Terminus	Vilnius—Turmantas	Pavilnys towards Turmantas
International services
Kaišiadorys towards Riga, Latvia	Vilnius—Riga	Terminus
Riga, Latvia towards Tallinn, Estonia	Vilnius—Riga—Tallinn	Terminus
Kaunas towards Kraków, Poland via Mockava	Vilnius—Warsaw—Kraków	Terminus
Future services
Preceding station	Rail Baltica	Following station
Panevėžys northbound	Rail Baltica	Terminus
Kaunas southbound	Rail Baltica	Terminus
Location
- Location within Lithuania

Vilnius Central Railway Station (Lithuanian: Vilniaus geležinkelio stotis) is the main passenger station in Vilnius, the capital and largest city of Lithuania. The railway station is situated between two neighbourhoods of Vilnius — Naujininkai and Naujamiestis — and on the edge of the Old Town. It is operated by LTG Link.

== History ==
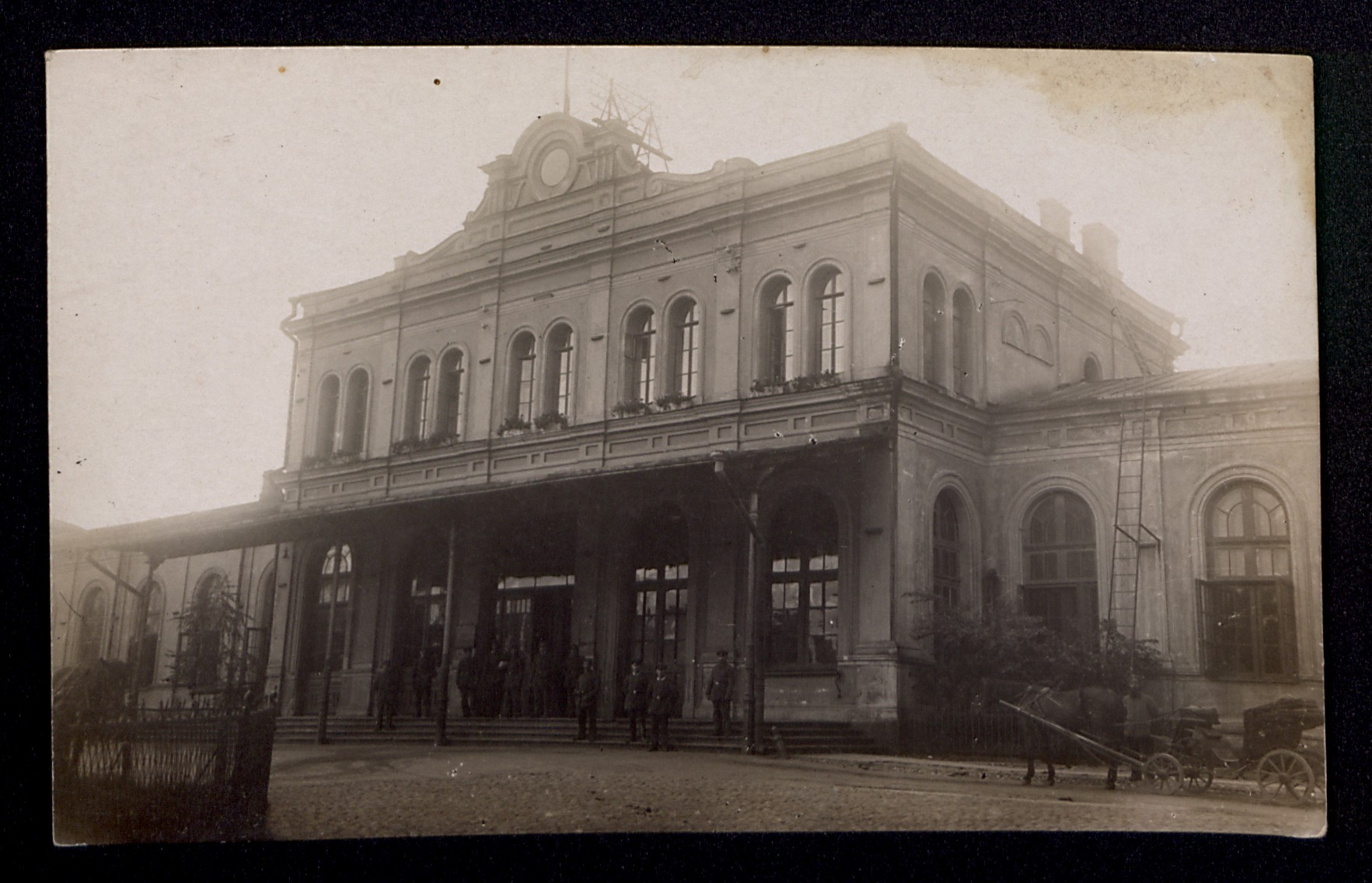
Station in 1920

The station was opened in 1869 while building the Saint Petersburg–Warsaw Railway. It was destroyed in 1945 during the World War II and in 1950 it was rebuilt in socialist realism style. The station was renovated in 1998 and then again in 2023.

In 2025, the city signed a contract with Zaha Hadid Architects to redesign the station and surrounding area.

== Services ==
Map of the Lithuanian railway network

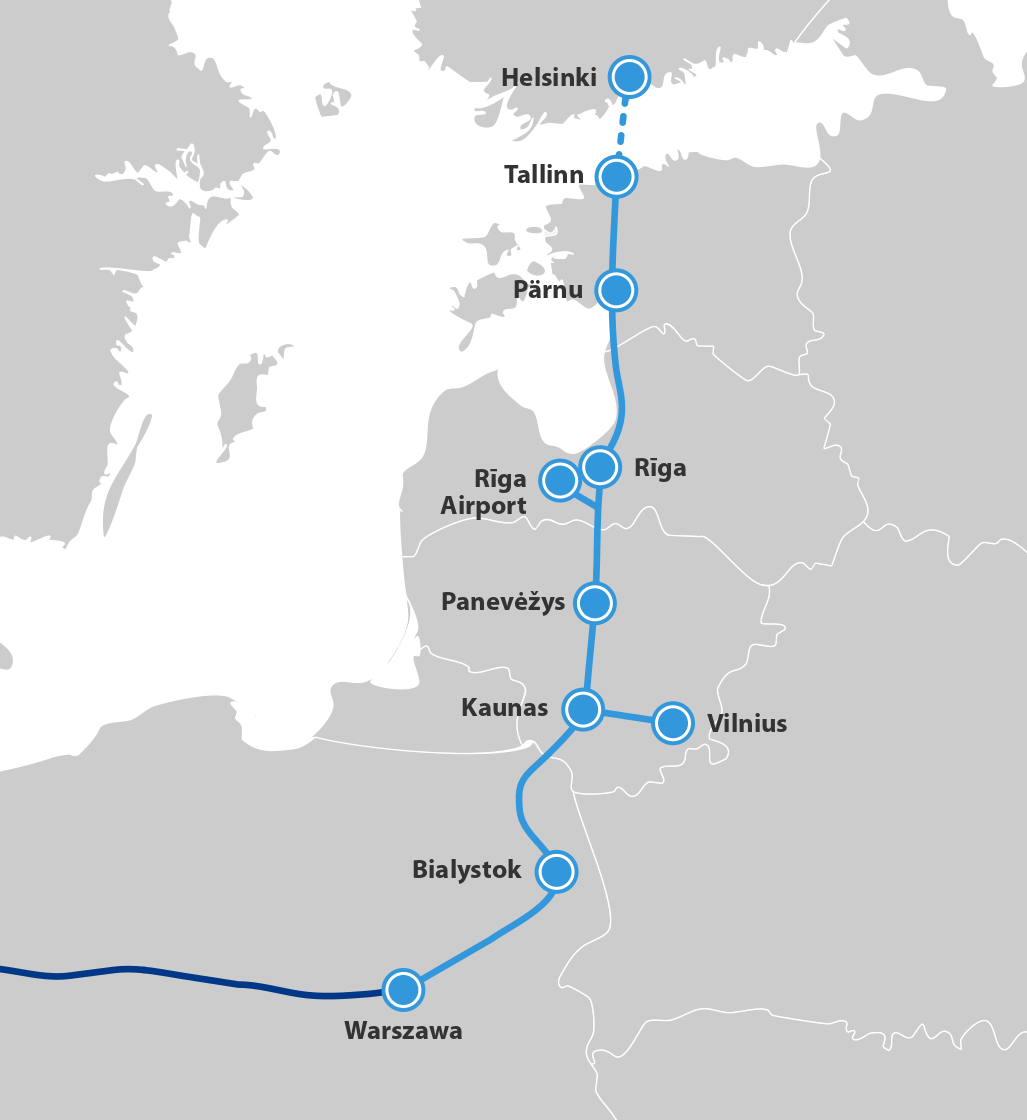

The following local passenger services run from Vilnius:

- Vilnius – Kaunas
- Vilnius – Trakai
- Vilnius – Šiauliai – Klaipėda
- Vilnius – Ignalina – Turmantas
- Vilnius – Varėna – Marcinkonys
- Vilnius – Kena
- Vilnius – Vilnius Airport – Jašiūnai

There are also the following international routes:

- Vilnius – Mockava – Warsaw – Kraków (to Poland)
- Vilnius – Riga (to Latvia)

Services were previously offered to Belarus but were suspended since March 2020 due to the COVID-19 pandemic. With 2022 Russian invasion of Ukraine, LTG stated that no plans to restart the trains in the foreseeable future.

There are ticket offices, cafeterias, bars and vending machines in the station.

== Public transportation ==
The station is a major Vilnius public transportation hub. The station can be reached by city public transport: trolleybuses, regular, fast and night buses. Vilnius bus station is around 180 meters (590 ft) away from the railway station. Vilnius international airport situates 3 kilometers (1.9 mi) away from the railway station and is accessible by taxi, busses and trains. Trains operated by LTG Link departure from Vilnius railway station every day and arrives to Vilnius Airport railway station.

== Gallery ==
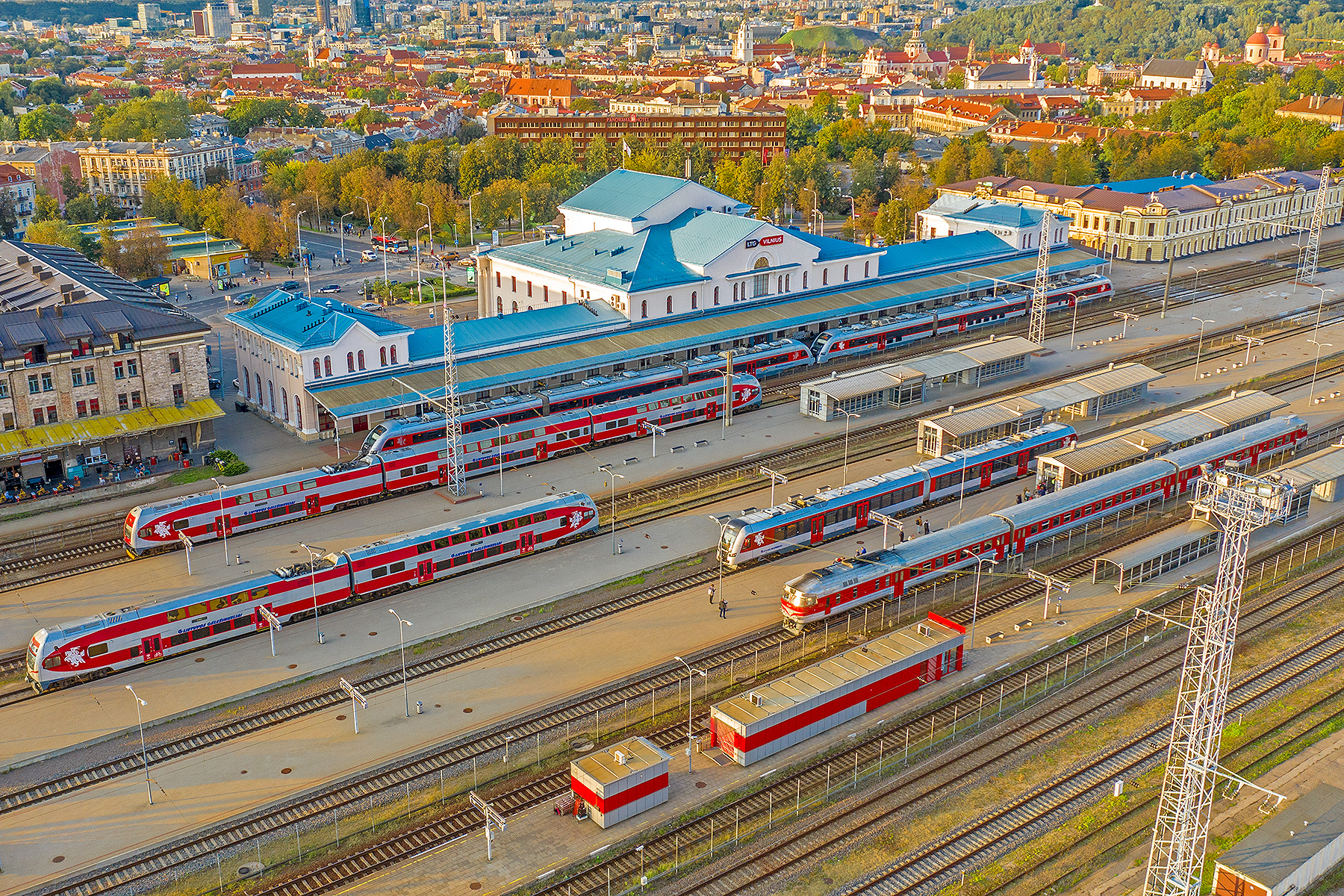
Aerial view

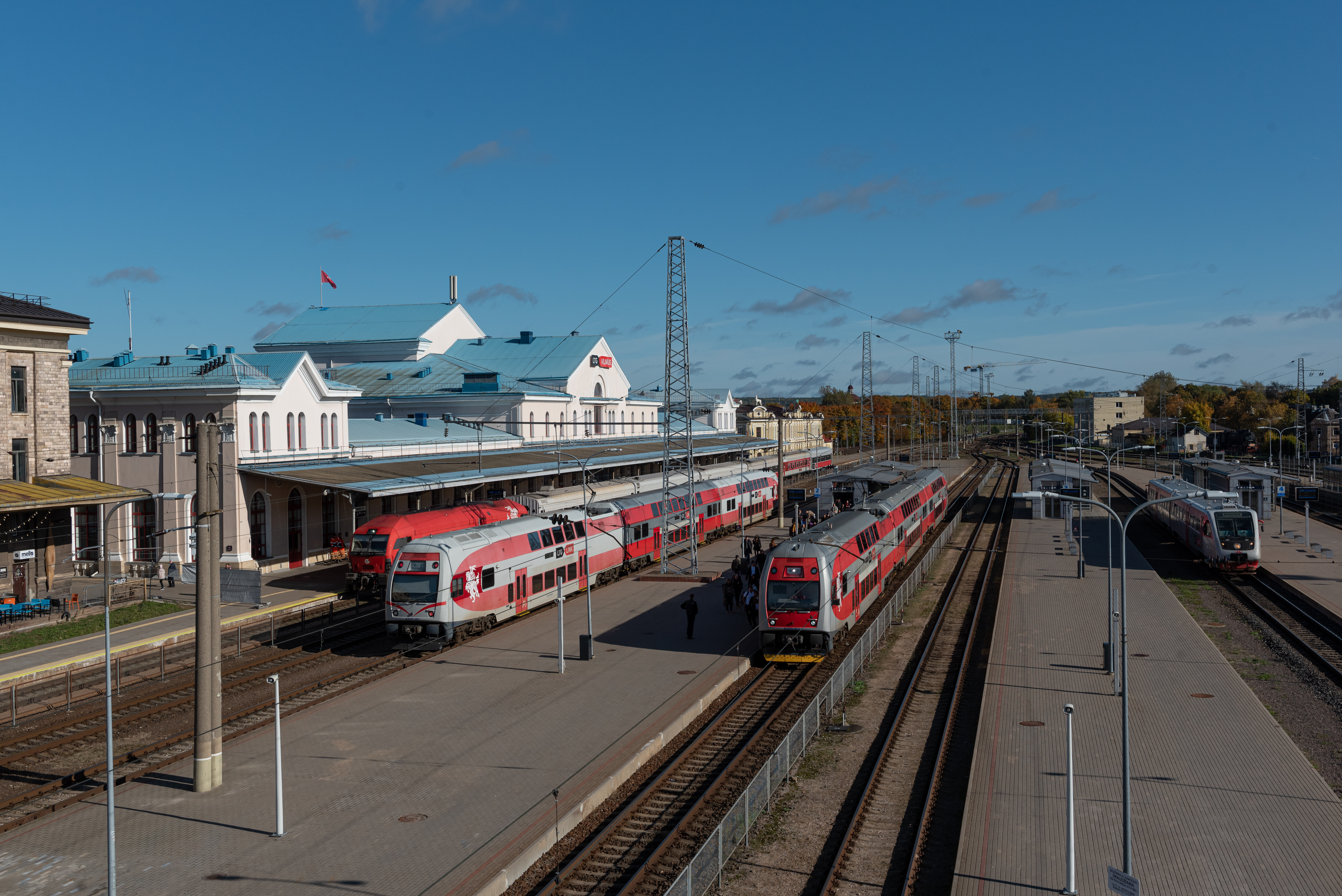
Overpass view at main platforms

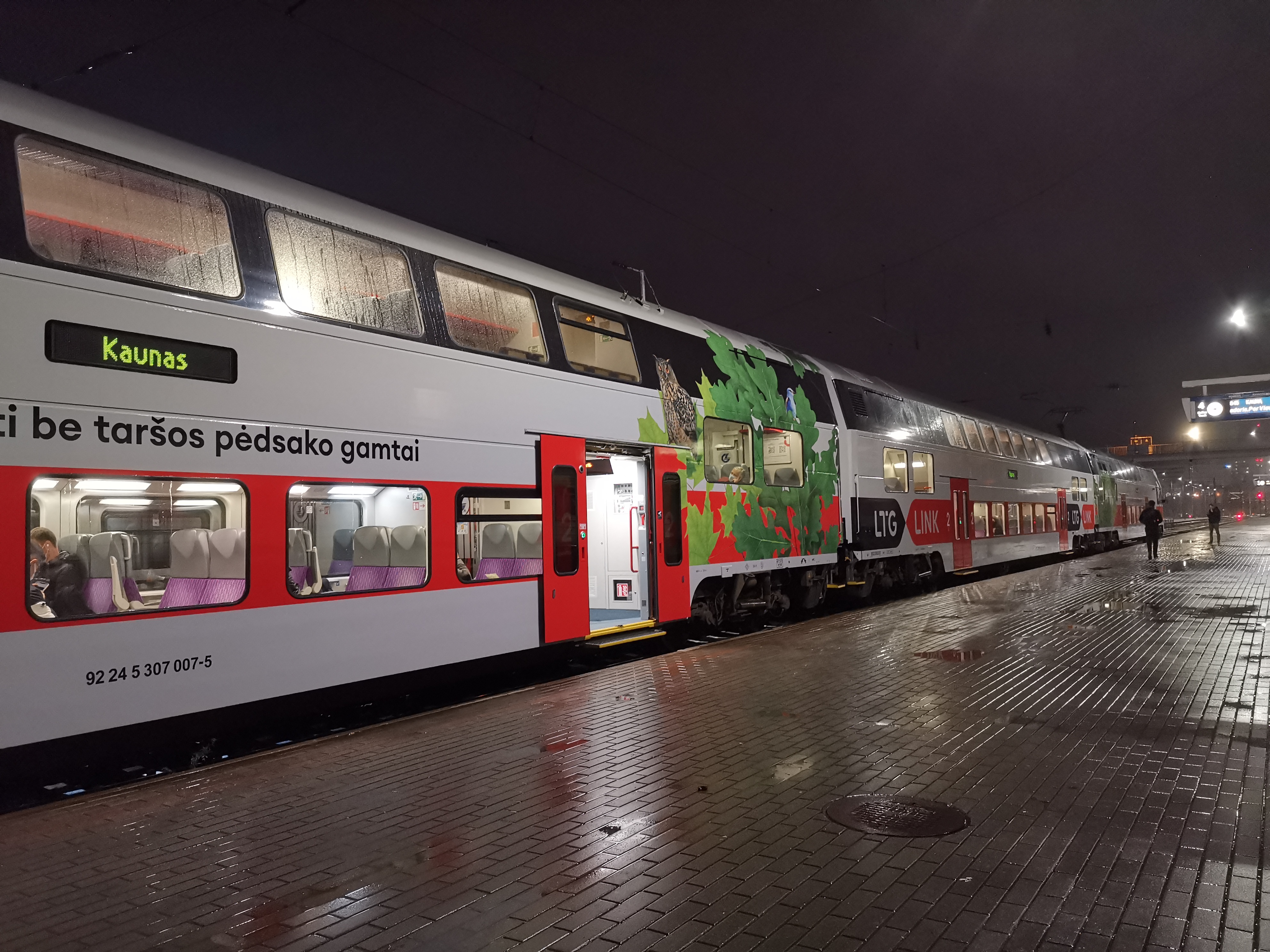
Train to Kaunas, platform view

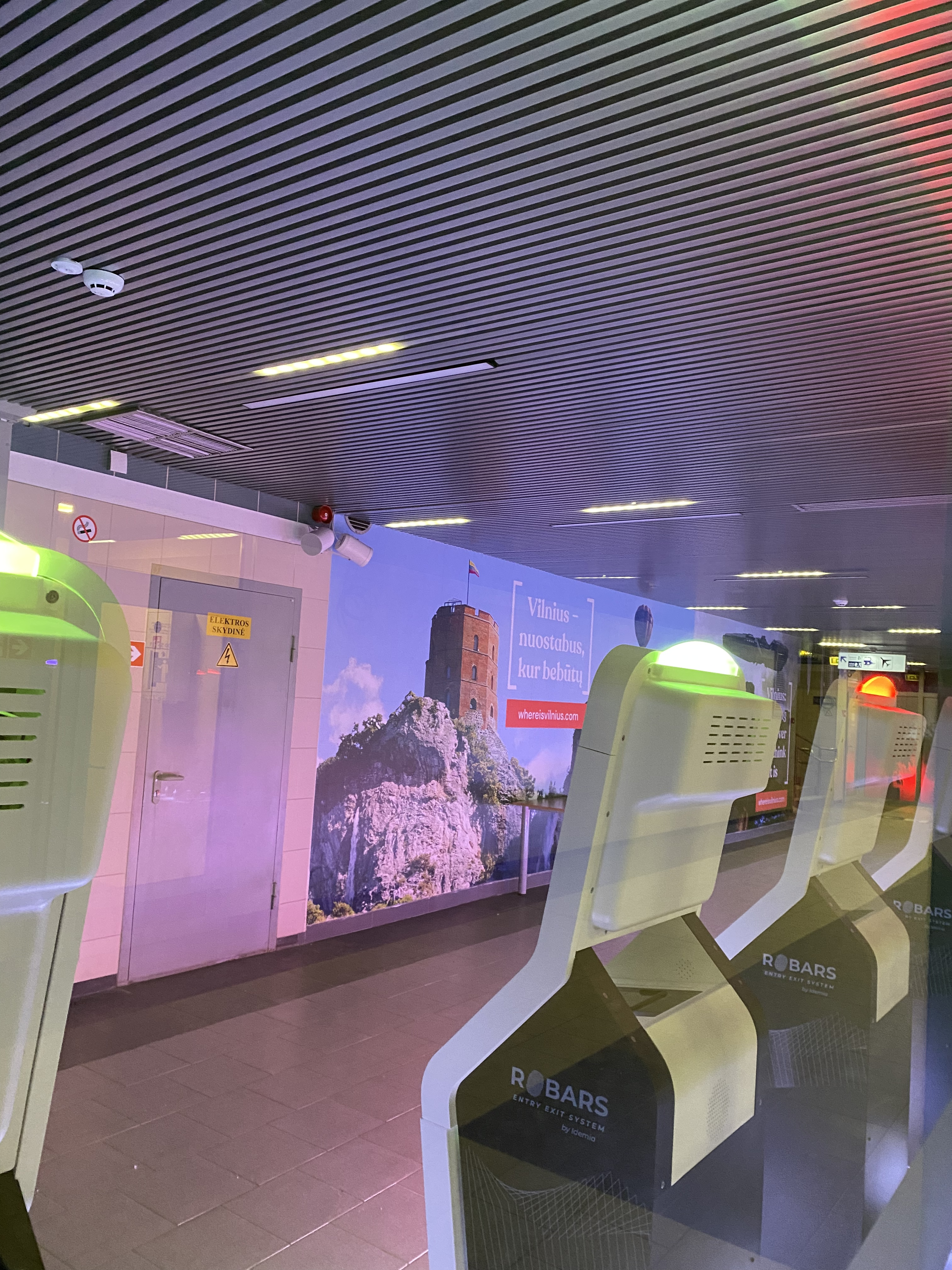
International departure safety hall

== See also ==
- List of railway stations in Lithuania
- Rail transport in Lithuania
- Transport in Lithuania
- Vilnius Airport Railway Station
- Rail Baltica
