= Paneriai railway station =

Railway station in Vilnius, Lithuania

Coordinates: 54°37′46″N 25°10′42″E

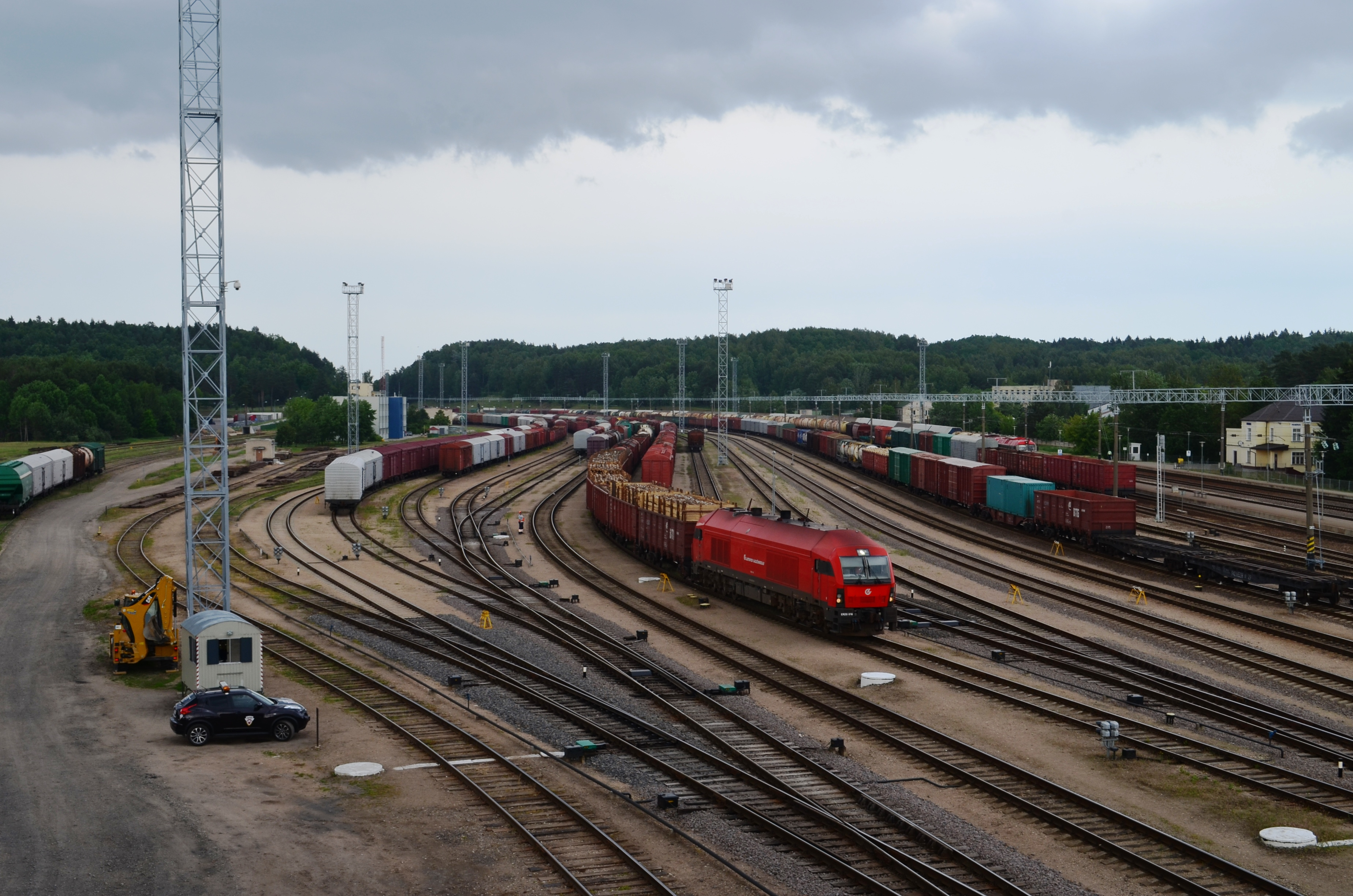
Railway junction in Paneriai

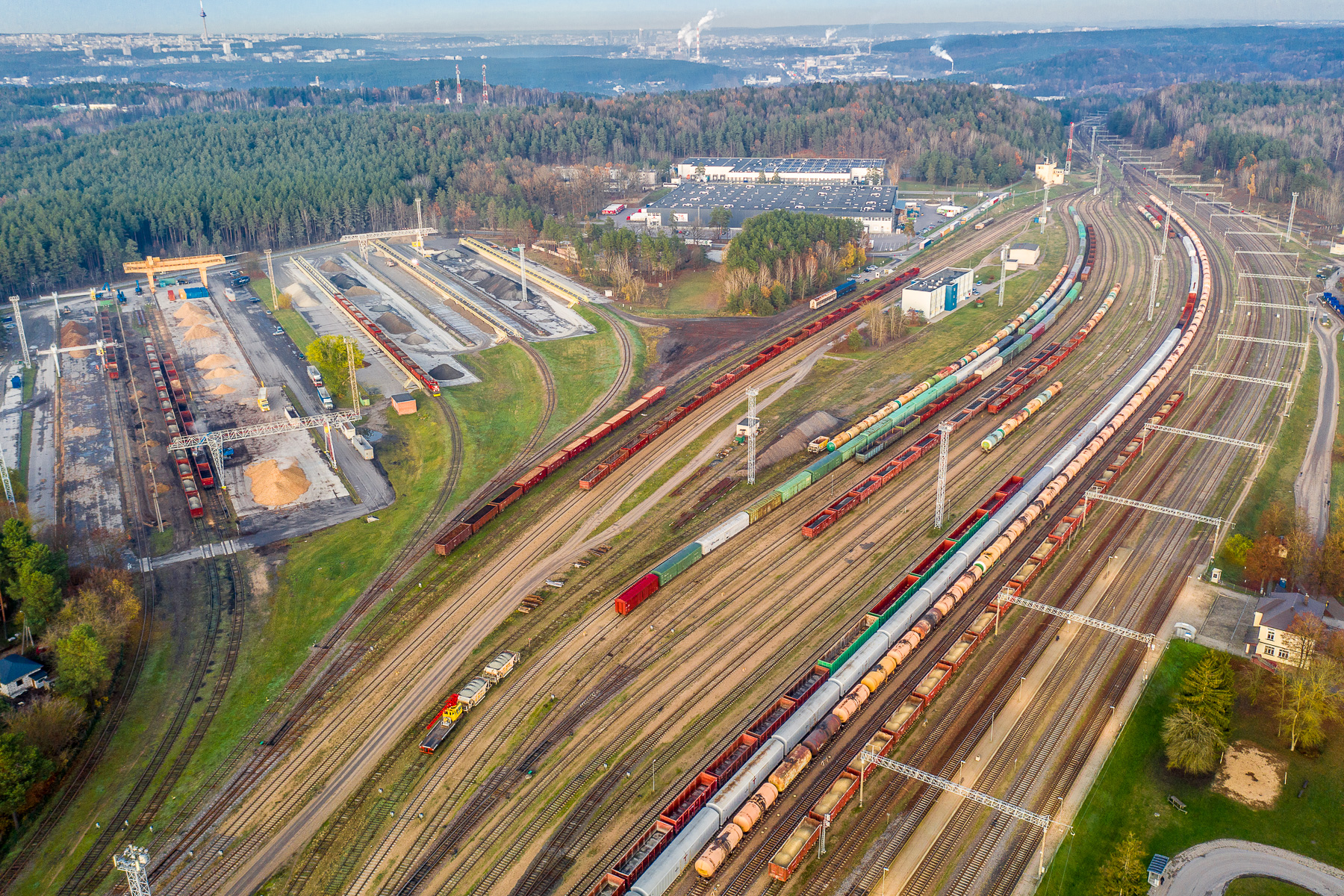
Aerial view

Paneriai railway station (Lithuanian: Panerių geležinkelio stotis) is a Lithuanian Railways station in Vilnius. It is mostly used for industry and cargo handling.

Part of its cargo transactions was moved to the new Vaidotai railway station.

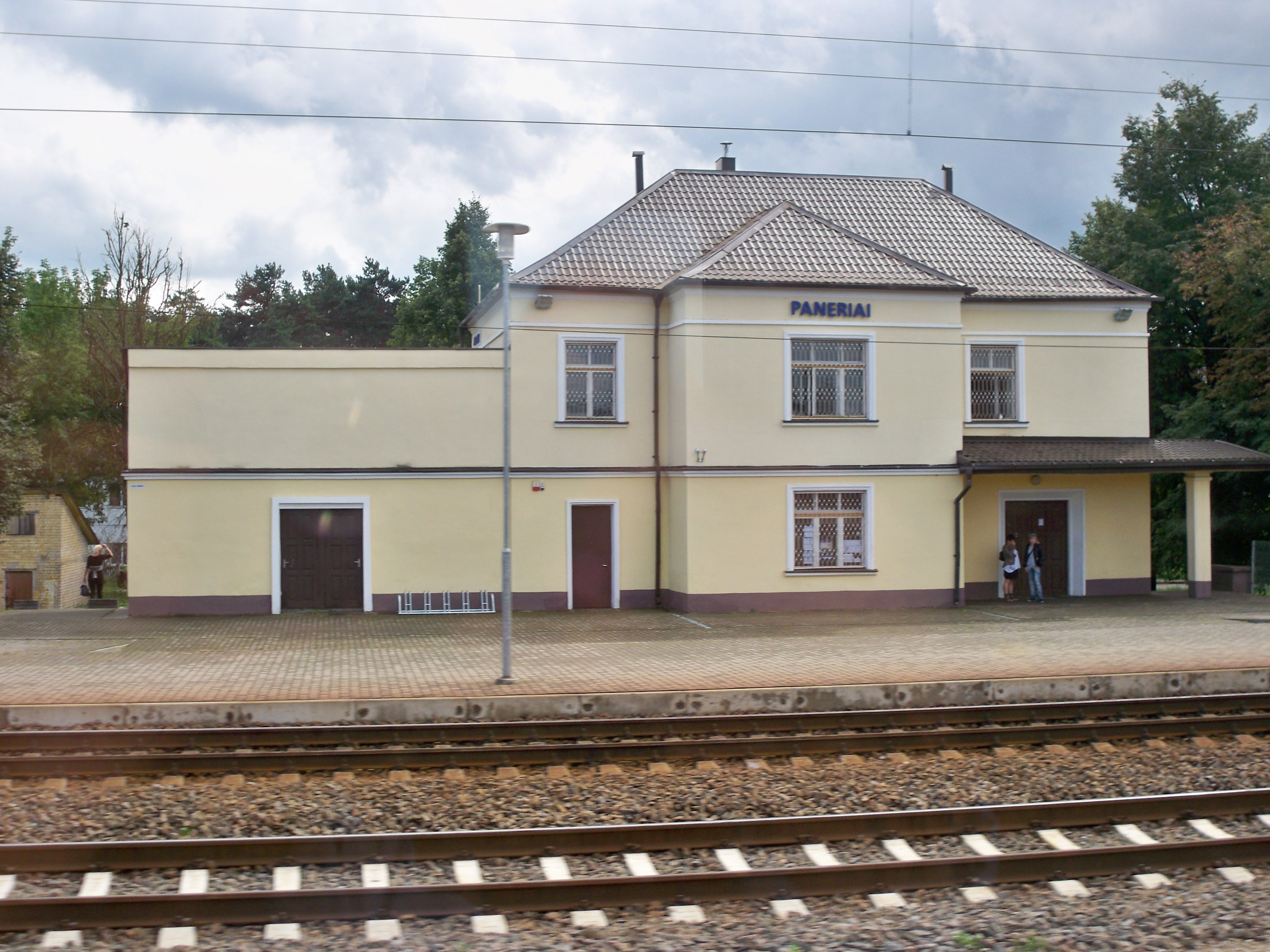
Paneriai railway station

Since 2013 a train with Peugeot productions has regularly gone from Paneriai railway station to Kazakhstan.

Preceding station	LTG Link	Following station
Lentvaris towards Kaunas	Vilnius–Kaunas	Vilnius Terminus

== See also ==
- List of railway stations in Lithuania
- Rail transport in Lithuania
- Transport in Lithuania
