= Vaidotai railway station =

Railway station in Vilnius, Lithuania

Coordinates: 54°35′39″N 25°12′37″E

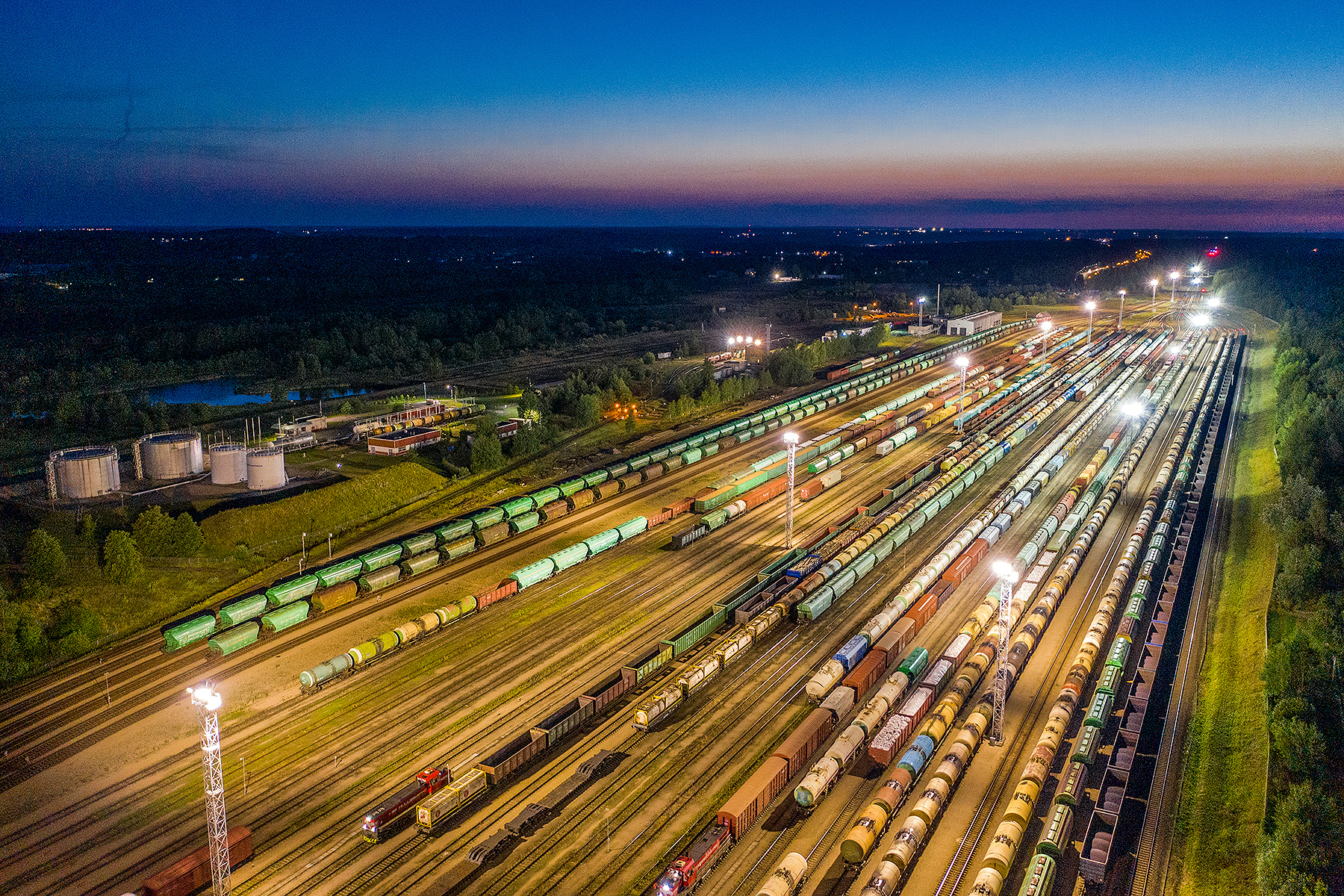

Vaidotai railway station (Lithuanian: Vaidotų geležinkelio stotis) is a Lithuanian Railways station in Vilnius. It is the main cargo transit station in Lithuania.

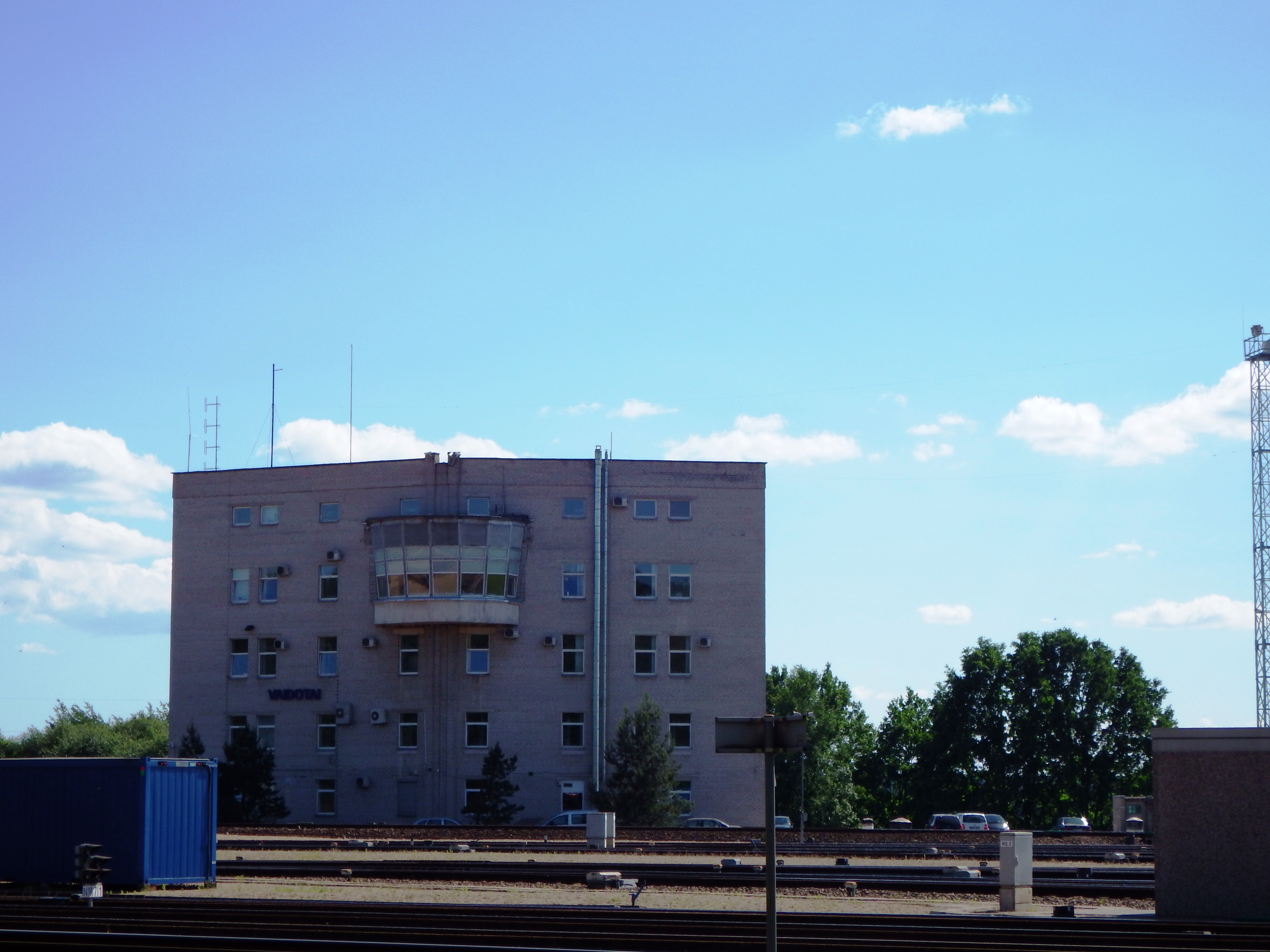
Vaidotai railway station, Vilnius

Vaidotai railway station was built in order to reduce cargo transactions in Vilnius railway station and Paneriai railway station. It is connected with Vilnius-Vaidotai-Paneriai railway circle. It also has connections with Belarus, Ukraine and local detour through Nemėžis and Kyviškės.

Vilnius Intermodal Terminal, the first dry port in Lithuania, was built next to the Vaidotai railway station.

Map of the Lithuanian railway network

== See also ==
- List of railway stations in Lithuania
- Rail transport in Lithuania
- Transport in Lithuania
