= Kaunas railway station =

Railway station in Kaunas, Lithuania

Kaunas
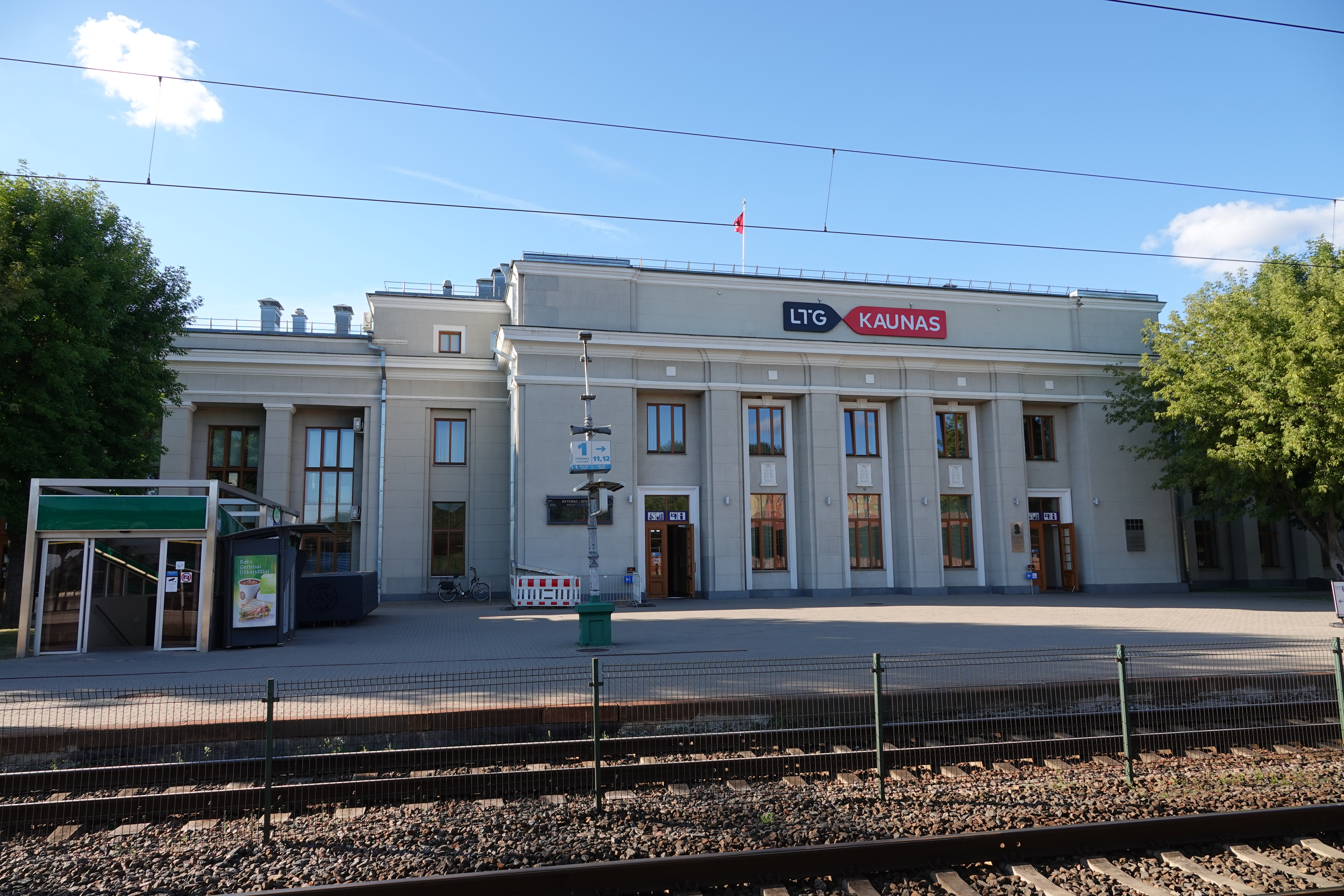
- Station in 2022

General information
- Location: M. K. Čiurlionio g. 16, LT-44362, Kaunas; Lithuania
- Coordinates: 54°53′11″N 23°55′53″E
- Owner: LTG
- Lines: Kaunas–Vilnius; Kaunas–Palemonas–Šiauliai; Kaunas–Kybartai; Kaunas–Marijampolė; Kaunas–Białystok (Poland)
- Connections: bus, trolleybus

Construction
- Accessible: yes

History
- Opened: 1859

Services
| Preceding station | LTG Link | Following station |
|---|---|---|
| Terminus | Vilnius–Kaunas | Palemonas towards Vilnius |
| Garliava towards Marijampolė | Kaunas—Marijampolė | Terminus |
| Garliava towards Kybartai | Kaunas–Kybartai | Terminus |
| Terminus | Kaunas—Šiauliai | Karčiupis towards Šiauliai |
International service
| Kazlu Ruda towards Kraków, Poland via Mockava | Vilnius—Warsaw—Kraków | Vilnius Terminus |
Future services
| Preceding station | Rail Baltica | Following station |
|---|---|---|
| Białystok | Rail Baltica | Panevėžys |
| Białystok | Rail Baltica | Vilnius |
Location
- Location within Lithuania

Kaunas railway station (Lithuanian: Kauno geležinkelio stotis) is a Lithuanian Railways central passenger railway station in Kaunas. It is located at the eastern edge of Central Kaunas, Lithuania. Kaunas railway station was included into the Registry of Immovable Cultural Heritage Sites of the Republic of Lithuania in 2003.

== History ==
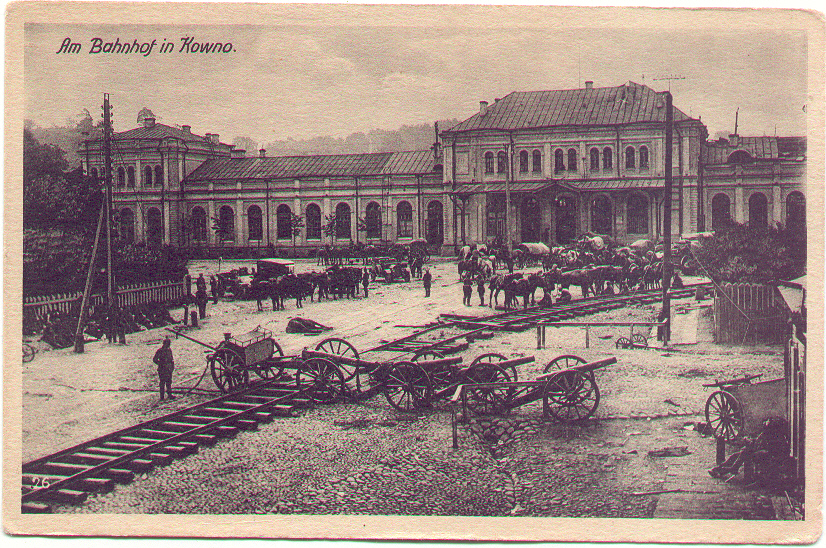
Station circa 1910

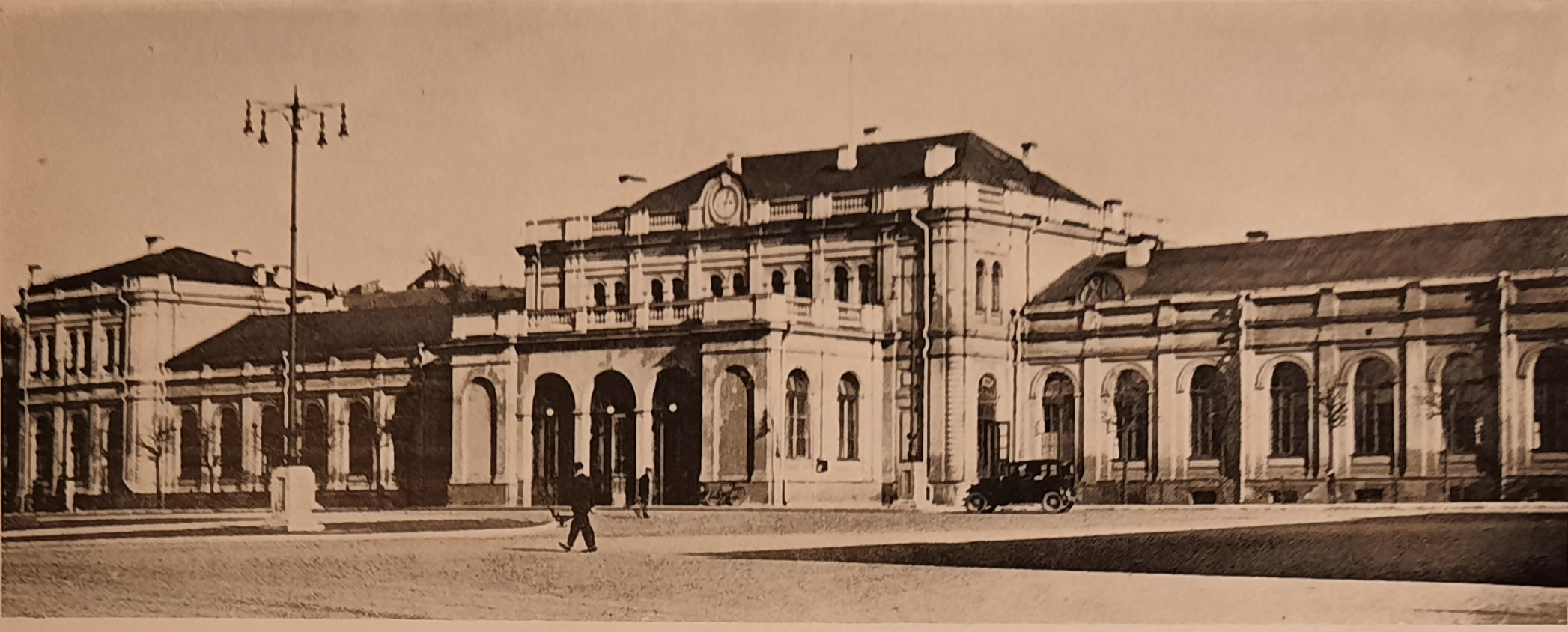
Station circa 1935

After the Russian Empire lost the Crimean War, the importance of tactical modern inventions, such as railways, became evident. In February 1851 the Government of Russia made a decision to build the Saint Petersburg–Warsaw Railway line. Starting from 1858 the line connecting Saint Petersburg and Warsaw was being built. In the territory of Lithuania, the construction of the railway section Daugavpils–Vilnius–Grodno including the branch Lentvaris–Kaunas–Kybartai (Virbalis) was started in spring 1859. The first railway stations in Lithuania were constructed on this line (21 stations): the super class stations in Lentvaris and Virbalis, as well as the first class stations in Kaunas and Vilnius. Due to the hilly and unfavorable for the direct rail passage terrain around Kaunas' centre, the Kaunas Railway Tunnel and largest in Lithuania railway bridge over the Nemunas river were constructed. On the 15 August 1861 the first train left Kaunas and reached Lentvaris. Kaunas railway station was officially opened on 21 February 1862. In 1944, the station was bombed by the withdrawing German army. The present-day Kaunas railway station was built in 1948 on the foundation of the old station and designed by architect Petr Ashastin. Its architecture was based on the principles of classicism: strict symmetry, separate and large-scale inner spaces, horizontally continued shape, massive walls and centrally oriented stairs. The station was reconstructed between 2005 and 9 April 2008.

== Services ==
=== International Passenger Trains ===
Direct weekend trains to Białystok (Poland) are operated by Polish railway company Polregio. These run on the non-electrified single track standard-gauge railway built as a first stage of the Rail Baltica project. As of 2019, this line terminates in a dedicated double-sided platform on the south-east side of the station.

Map of the Lithuanian railway network

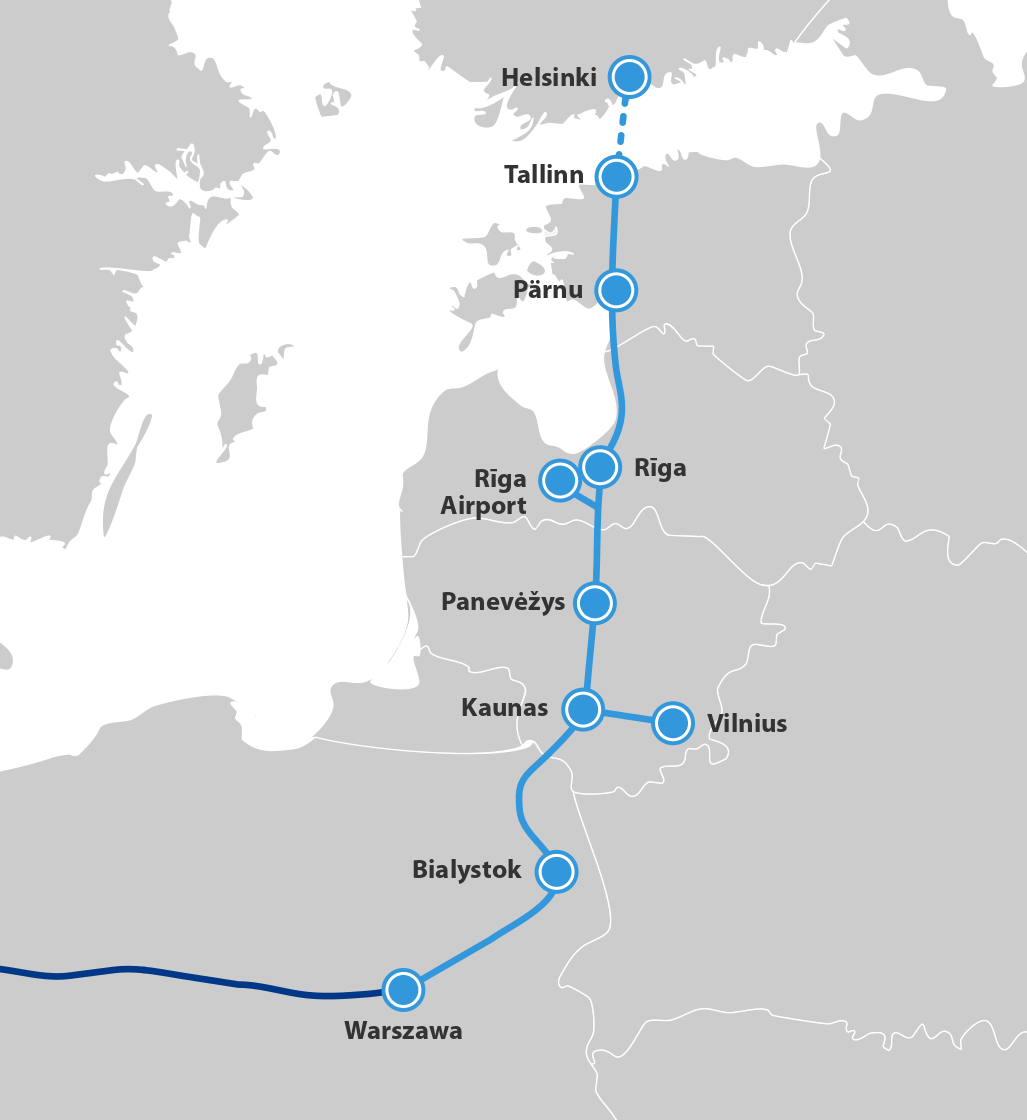

== See also ==
- List of railway stations in Lithuania
- Rail transport in Lithuania
- Transport in Lithuania
