= Žasliai =

- Town
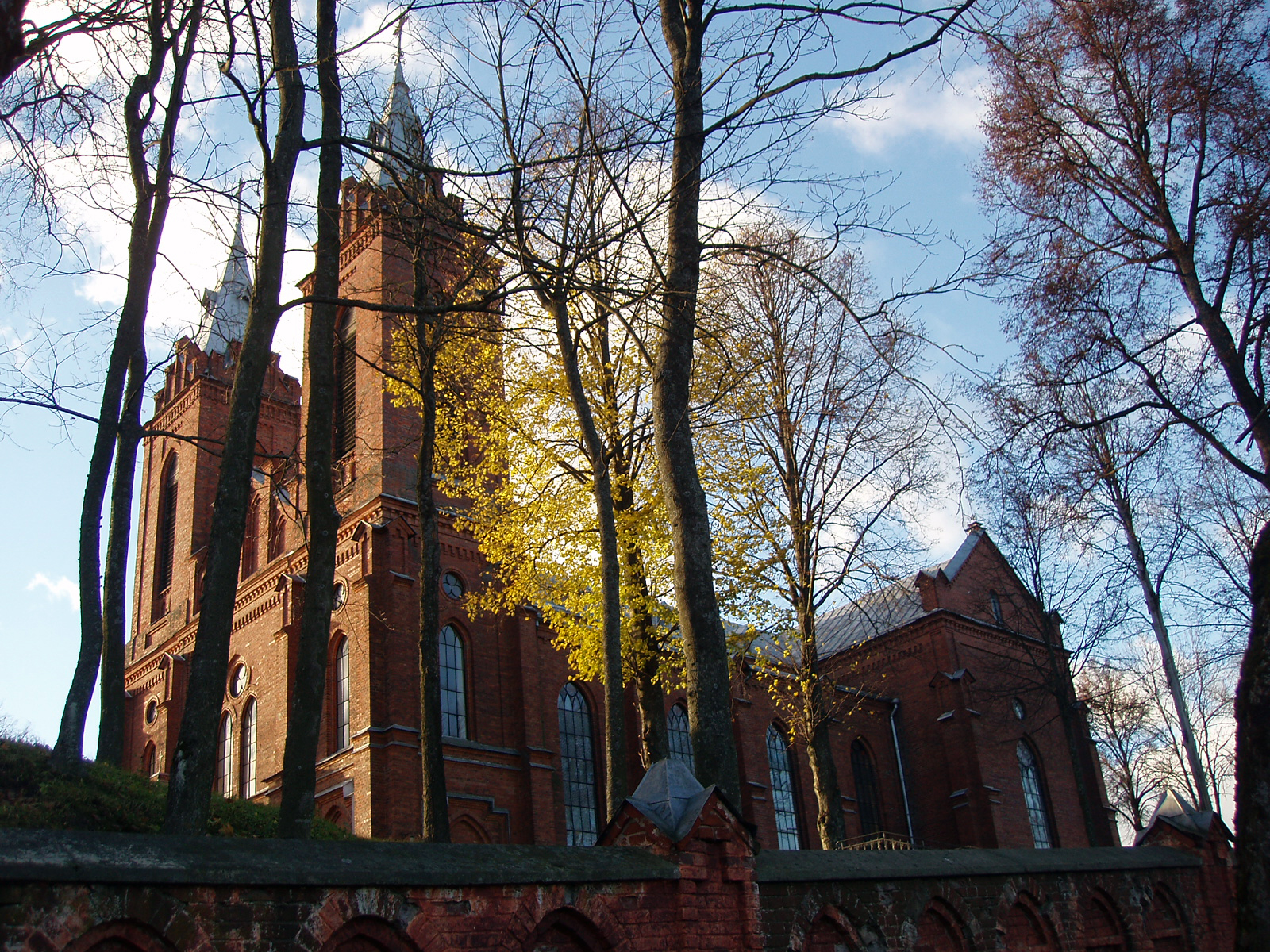
- Church of Saint George

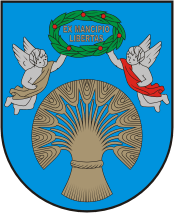
- Coat of arms

- Location in Lithuania
- Coordinates: 54°51′50″N 24°35′20″E
- Country: Lithuania
- Ethnographic region: Aukštaitija
- County: Kaunas County
- First mentioned: 1457
- Granted city rights: 1792

Population (2011)
  - Total: 644
- Time zone: UTC+2 (EET)
  - Summer (DST): UTC+3 (EEST)

Žasliai (Polish: Żośle, Yiddish: זאָסלע Zosle) is a small town in Kaunas County in central Lithuania. In 2011, it had a population of 644. The town was first mentioned in written sources in 1457 and was granted the Magdeburg rights and its own coat of arms in 1792.

== History ==
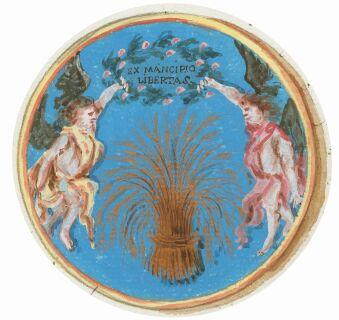
Old coat of arms of Žasliai, 1792

Žasliai was first mentioned on 28 February 1457. During the reign of the Grand Duke of Lithuania Vytautas, Žasliai belonged to Lithuanian nobleman Jaunius Valimantaitis from Valimantas family and later to noblemen from Goštautas family. In 1522 Žasliai was a town. In 16th century Žasliai was the property of the Grand Duke of Lithuania Sigismund II Augustus who later donated it to his wife Barbara Radziwiłł. In the map Magni Ducatus Lituaniae caeterarumque regionum illi adiacentium exacta descriptio issued in 1613 by Mikołaj Krzysztof Radziwiłł the Orphan, Žasliai was marked as a rural town. In 1777 operating parish school was mentioned. On 12 January 1792, Žasliai got Magdeburgian rights and the coat of arms with the inscription EX MANCIPIO LIBERTAS (Freedom comes from property).

Žasliai were mentioned in the Lithuanian legend about Palemonids. After the death of Pajauta, mother of the Duke Kukovaitis, he created an idol for her an erected it near the lake of Žasliai. Inhabitants believed Pajauta was a goddess and worshiped her. After the idol perished, the place was worshipped.

During the Lithuanian Wars of Independence on 2–8 April 1919 the Žasliai battle was fought between Lithuanian and Soviet Russian armies. 1400 Lithuanian soldiers commanded by officers Stasys Nastopka, Kazys Škirpa, Jurgis Butkus fought in the battle.

In the middle of the nineteenth century, approximately 650 Jews resided in Žasliai. On the eve of the Soviet annexation of Lithuania in 1940, the roughly 1000 Jewish inhabitants of the town made up half of the total population, making a living from commerce, artisanship and agriculture. On June 22, 1941, the German army invaded Lithuania, entering Žasliai within days thereafter. On August 17 of 1941, most of the town's Jewish inhabitants were driven out to Kaišiadorys. Ten days later they were killed, along with Jews from Kaišiadorys and Žiežmariai.

Soviet occupants in 1941, 1948, 1949 deported 27 inhabitants of Žasliai. Lithuanian partisans from the Didžioji Kova military district (The Great Fight partisan military district) were active in Žasliai district.

In 1975 in Žasliai train station the biggest railroad catastrophe in the history of Lithuania happened - Žasliai railway disaster.

== Notable people ==
- Leopold Godowsky
- Pranas Gudynas – Lithuanian painter, restaurator, art critic.
- Benzion Halper – Hebraist and Arabist
- Balys Mastauskas – lawyer.
- Vidas Petkevičius – theater and film actor.
- Edmundas Arbas-Arbačiauskas – Lithuanian architect.
- Vincentas Sladkevičius – Lithuanian Cardinal
