= Vilnius bus station =

Bus station in Vilnius, Lithuania

Coordinates: 54°40′14″N 25°16′56″E

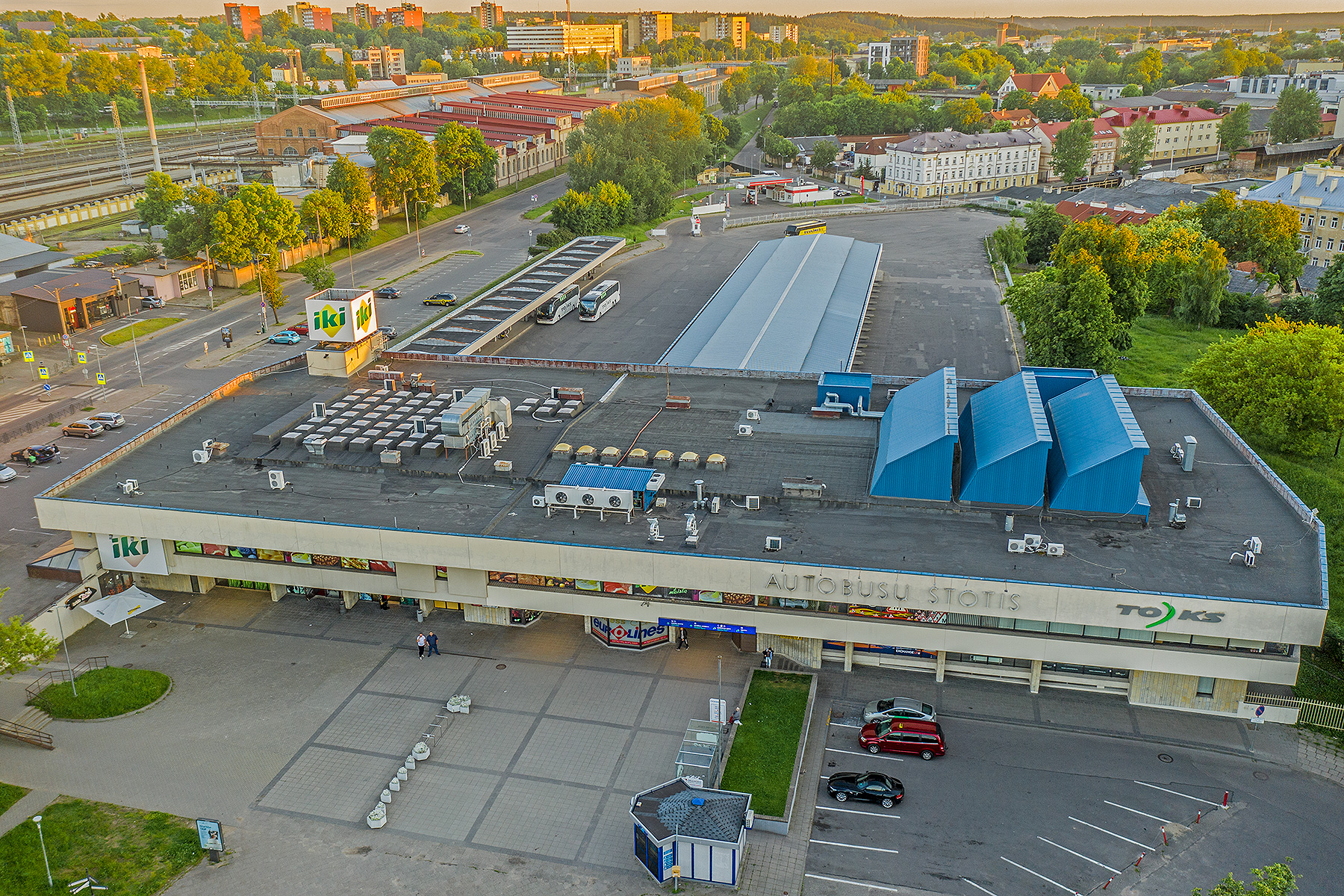
Aerial view

Vilnius Bus Station (Lithuanian: Vilniaus autobusų stotis) is the main bus station in Vilnius, Lithuania. It is located next to Vilnius Railway Station.

== Routes ==
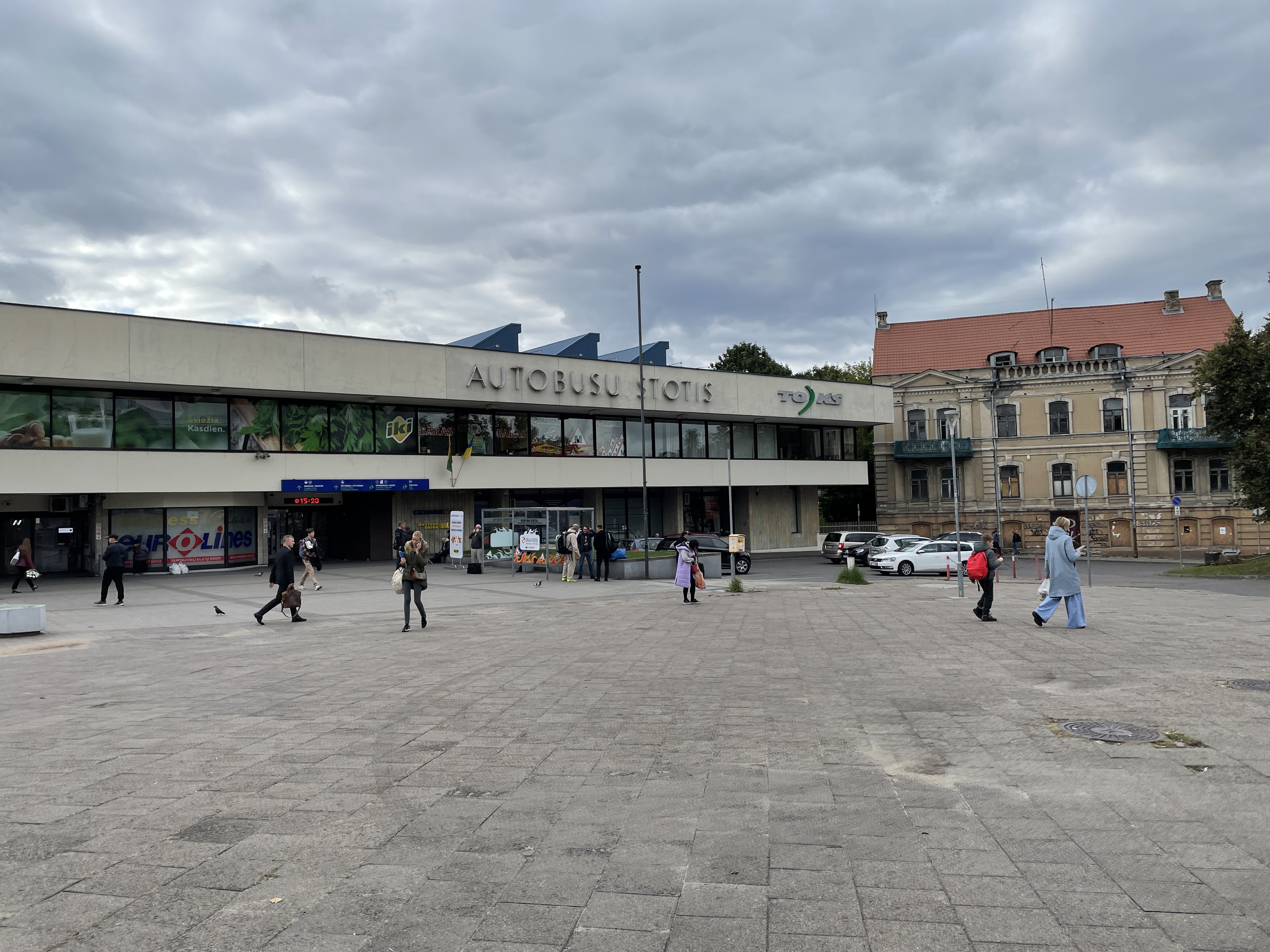
Plaza and the main entrance

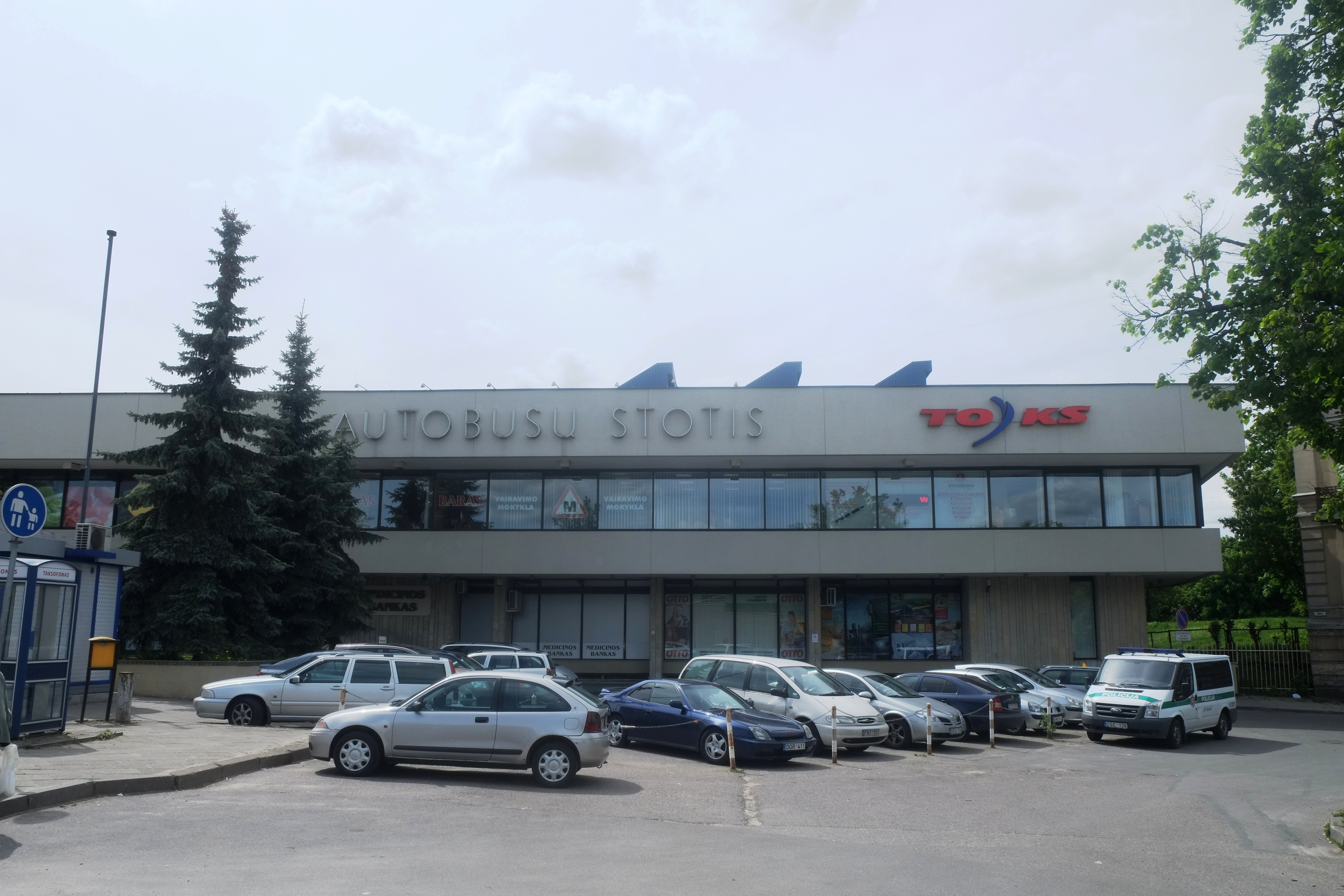
Main building of Vilnius bus station

Local routes connect Vilnius Bus Station to most cities, towns and villages in Lithuania. International routes connect Vilnius bus station with the United Kingdom, Austria, Belarus, Hungary, Norway, Sweden, Ukraine, Ireland, Greece, Switzerland, Denmark, Italy, the Czech Republic, Germany, Finland, Spain, Portugal, Belgium, the Netherlands, Morocco, Poland, Estonia, Latvia and France.

== Links ==
http://autobusustotis.lt/ official website
