= Vilnius Airport railway station =

Railway station in Vilnius, Lithuania

Vilnius Airport Vilniaus oro uosto
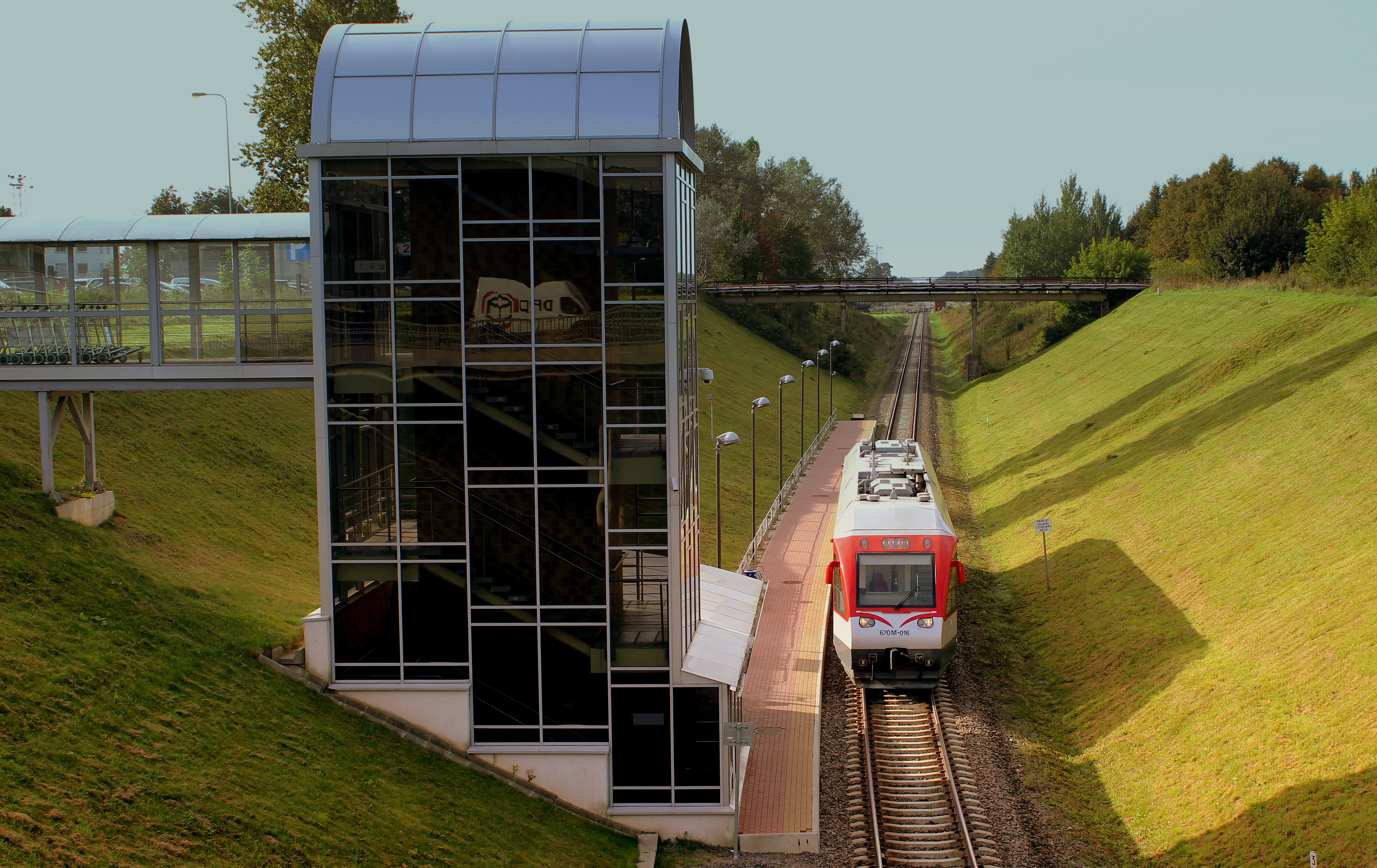
- The railway station in 2013

General information
- Location: Vaitkaus g. 1 Lithuania
- Coordinates: 54°38′32″N 25°16′35″E
- Train operators: LTG Link

Services
Preceding station	LTG Link	Following station
Terminus	Vilnius—Vilnius Airport	Vilnius Terminus
Vilnius—Jašiūnai does not stop here
Location
- Location within Lithuania

Vilnius Airport Railway Station (Lithuanian: Vilniaus oro uosto geležinkelio stotelė) is a railway station serving Vilnius International Airport, Lithuania. It was opened on 2 October 2008.

== Services ==
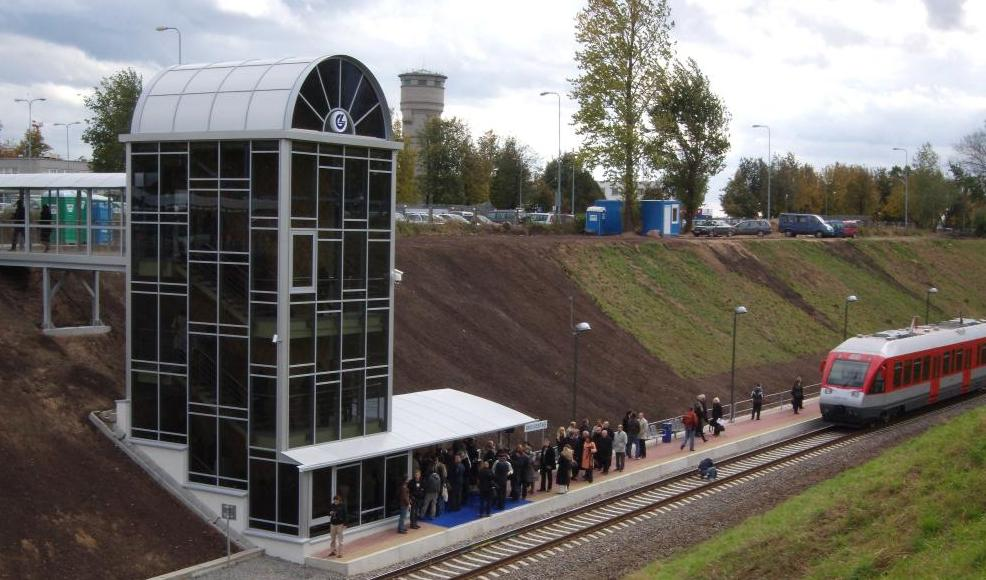
Vilnius airport railway station, view from north-west

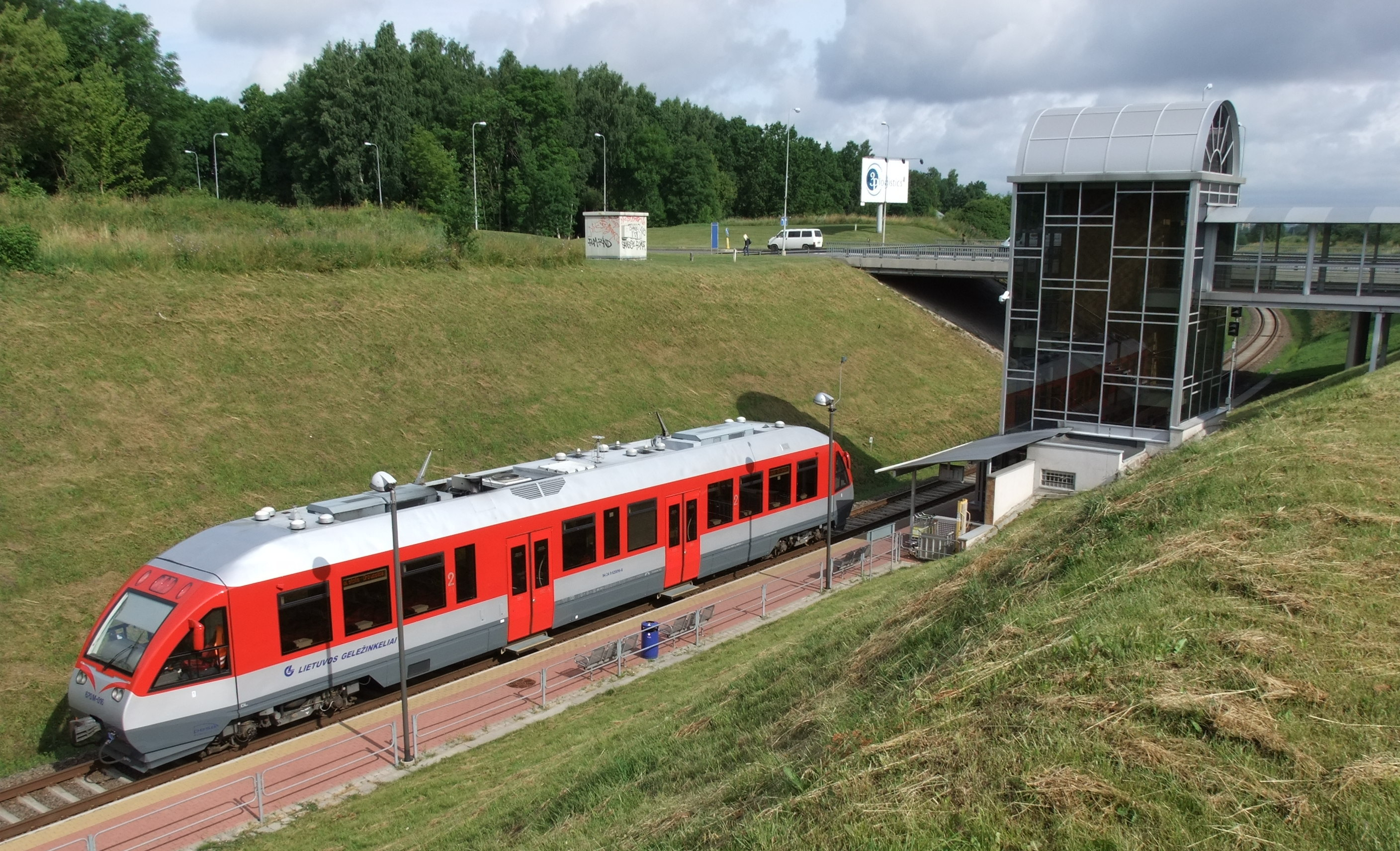
Vilnius airport railway station, view from south-east

Map of the Lithuanian railway network

Railbuses running between Vilnius Airport and Vilnius Central Station are the only vehicles serving the station. They are the fastest way to go from the airport to the city centre, taking 8 minutes for a price of €0.90. 16 trains serve the station per day with intervals ranging from 31 to 84 minutes. Vilnius airport is one of the two airports in the Baltic states to have a direct rail connection with the city centre, the other one being Tallinn Airport, which has a direct tram connection to Tallinn downtown since September 2017.

The line from the airport to the main station is being electrified as of 2026.

== See also ==
- List of railway stations in Lithuania
- Rail transport in Lithuania
- Transport in Lithuania
