= LTG Link =

Lithuanian rail transport company

UAB LTG Link

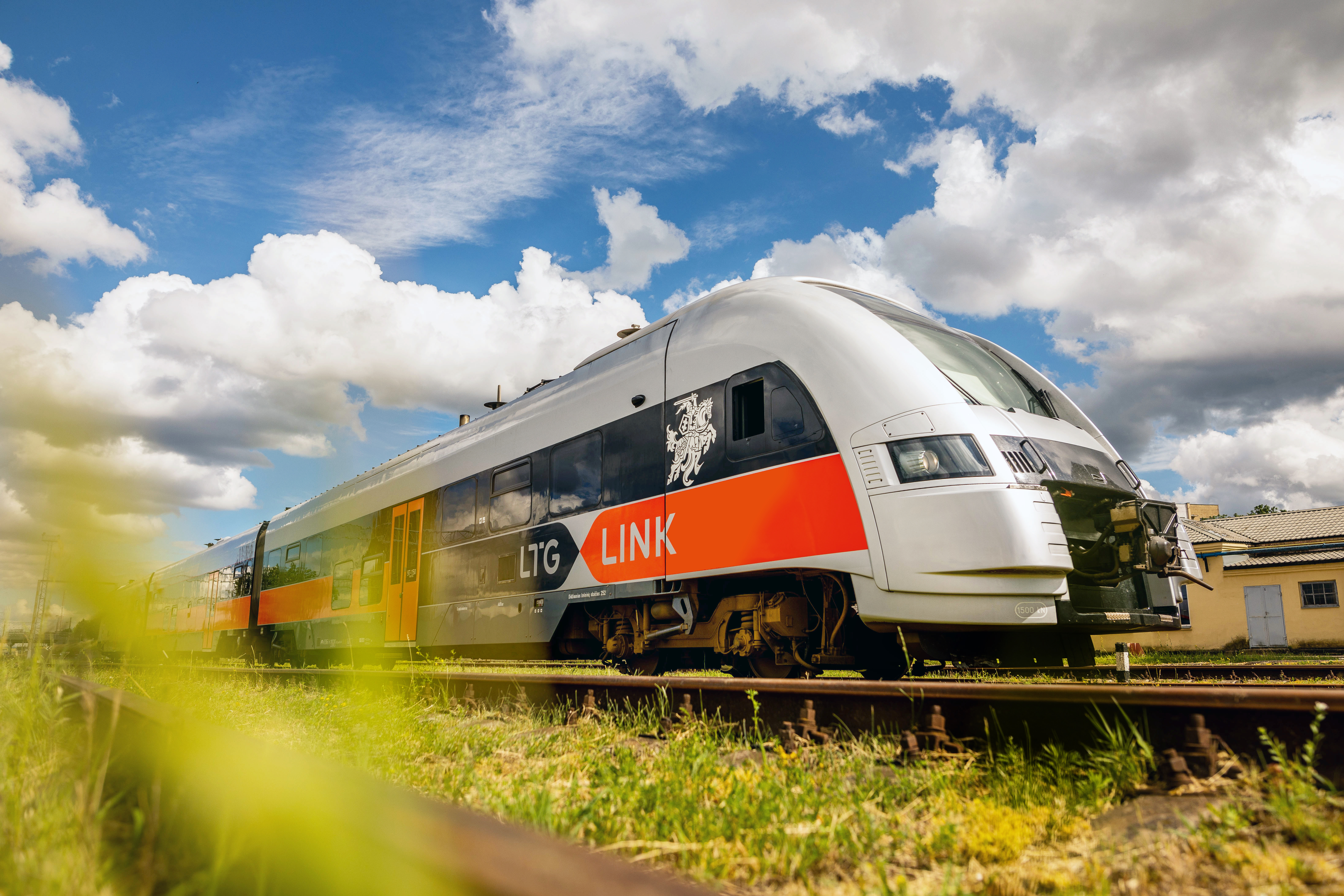
- Trade name: LTG Link
- Type: Subsidiary
- Industry: Rail transport
- Predecessor: Lietuvos geležinkeliai
- Founded: 2019
- Headquarters: Vilnius, Lithuania
- Area served: Lithuania, Poland, Latvia, Estonia (only Valga)
- Services: Passenger train services
- Owner: Ministry of Transport and Communications (100%)
- Parent: LTG Group
- Website: ltglink.lt

LTG Link is a government-owned passenger train operator in Lithuania. It is part of the LTG Group (officially, Lietuvos geležinkeliai). LTG Link operates domestic and international passenger services across Lithuania and on routes to Poland, Latvia, and beyond. The word "Link" in the name carries a dual meaning: in English, it means "connection", while in Lithuanian, it means "towards".

== History ==
LTG Link was established in 2019 to be a separate division within Lietuvos Geležinkeliai to manage passenger transport independently, aligning with European Union regulations requiring separation of passenger and freight operations. This reorganisation, which took place in 2020, created three LTG subsidiaries: LTG Link for passenger services, LTG Cargo for freight, and LTG Infra for infrastructure management. The restructuring aimed to streamline operations, with LTG Link receiving subsidies from the Lithuanian government to support public transport objectives.

In 2020, LTG rebranded, introducing a new logo featuring an arrow symbolising movement and connectivity. The changes were introduced under LTG CEO Mantas Bartuška, who stated that LTG Link's mission is to modernise and expand Lithuania's passenger rail services to meet growing national and international demand.

== Services ==
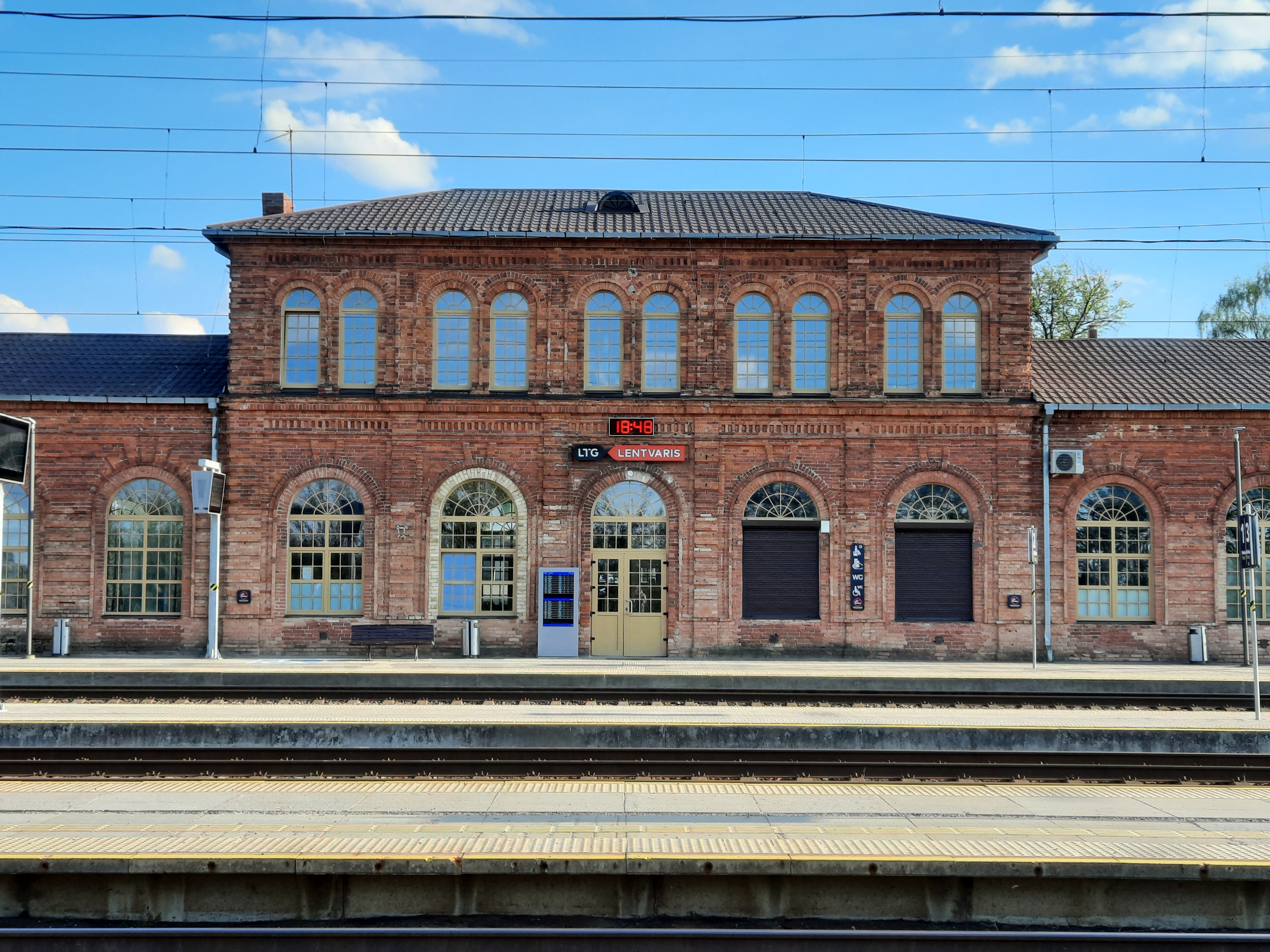
Train station in Lentvaris.

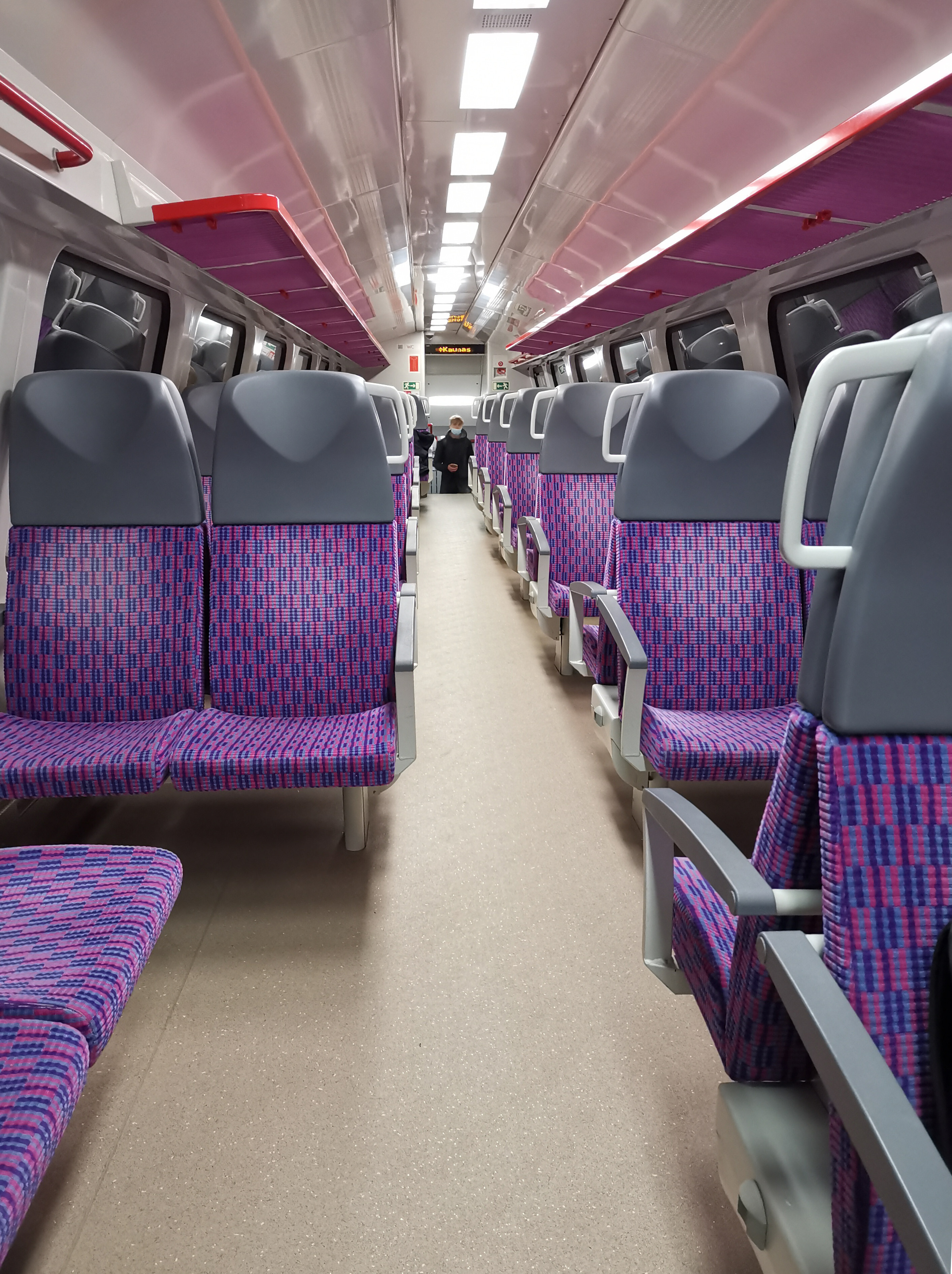
LTG Link service Vilnius–Kaunas, interior of the second class in Škoda EJ575.

LTG Link provides regular regional and long-distance passenger services within Lithuania and operates on selected international routes. Key international services include connections to Latvia, including the route to Riga, and planned future services to Poland. LTG Link's expansion also includes plans for cross-border services between Vilnius and Warsaw with modern amenities such as air-conditioning, Wi-Fi, and power outlets, aiming for a journey time of approximately eight hours.

In 2022, LTG Link integrated its scheduling and ticketing system with Google Maps, allowing easier access to train schedules and tickets. LTG Link's objective is to expand its route network and improve passenger experience through digital and infrastructure improvements.

=== Main lines ===
- Vilnius—Kaunas, 104 km (65 mi), first built in 1862, electrified in 1975. The fastest train takes 59 minutes.
- Vilnius—Klaipėda, 376 km (234 mi), part of the line first built in 1870, electrified in 2026. The line is served by the Stadler FLIRT.

International lines:

- Vilnius—Riga, 348 km (216 mi), available since late 2023 and takes 4 hours 15 minutes.
- Vilnius—Warsaw—Krakow, available since late 2022. Indirect route due to change of gauge at Polish border, transfer from LTG Link train to PKP Intercity at Mockava. Vilnius—Warsaw travel time around 9 hours.

Vilnius—Riga—Tallinn passenger train route began operating in 2025.

- Rail Baltica: Kaunas — Panevėžys; Kaunas — Vilnius; Kaunas — Riga; Kaunas — Marijampolė The lines are scheduled to open in 2028-2035.

== Rolling stock ==
LTG Link's fleet includes a variety of locomotives, diesel multiple units (DMUs), electric multiple units (EMUs), and passenger carriages. The company operates both modern and legacy rolling stock, with upgrades in progress.

LTG Link Rolling Stock
Type	Model	Quantity	Notes
Diesel Multiple Unit (DMU)	Pesa 730M	7	Used for regional services.
Electric Multiple Unit (EMU)	Škoda EJ 575	14	Primarily used on electrified routes.
Electric Multiple Unit (EMU)	Stadler FLIRT	9	Entered service in 2026 on electrified routes.
Battery-Electric Multiple Unit (BEMU)	Stadler FLIRT	6	Entered service in 2026.
Railcar	Pesa 620M	13	Used on non-electrified lines.
Railcar	Pesa 630M	3	Serves non-electrified routes.
Passenger Carriage	Various	23	Used for long-distance services. Hauled by a Siemens locomotive.

In 2023, LTG Link ordered 15 Stadler FLIRT trains as part of its fleet expansion. These trains entered service in late 2026.

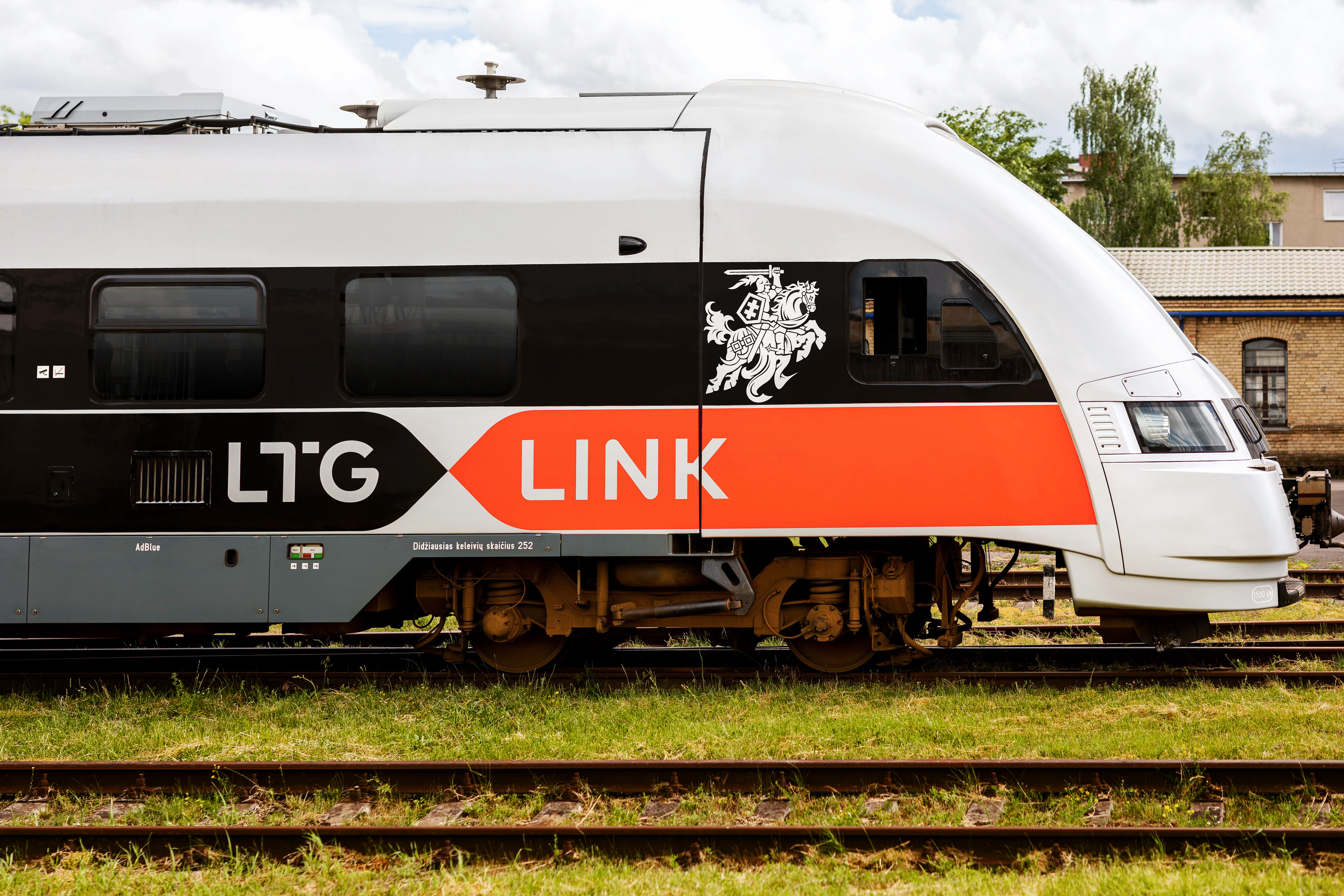
Pesa 730ML

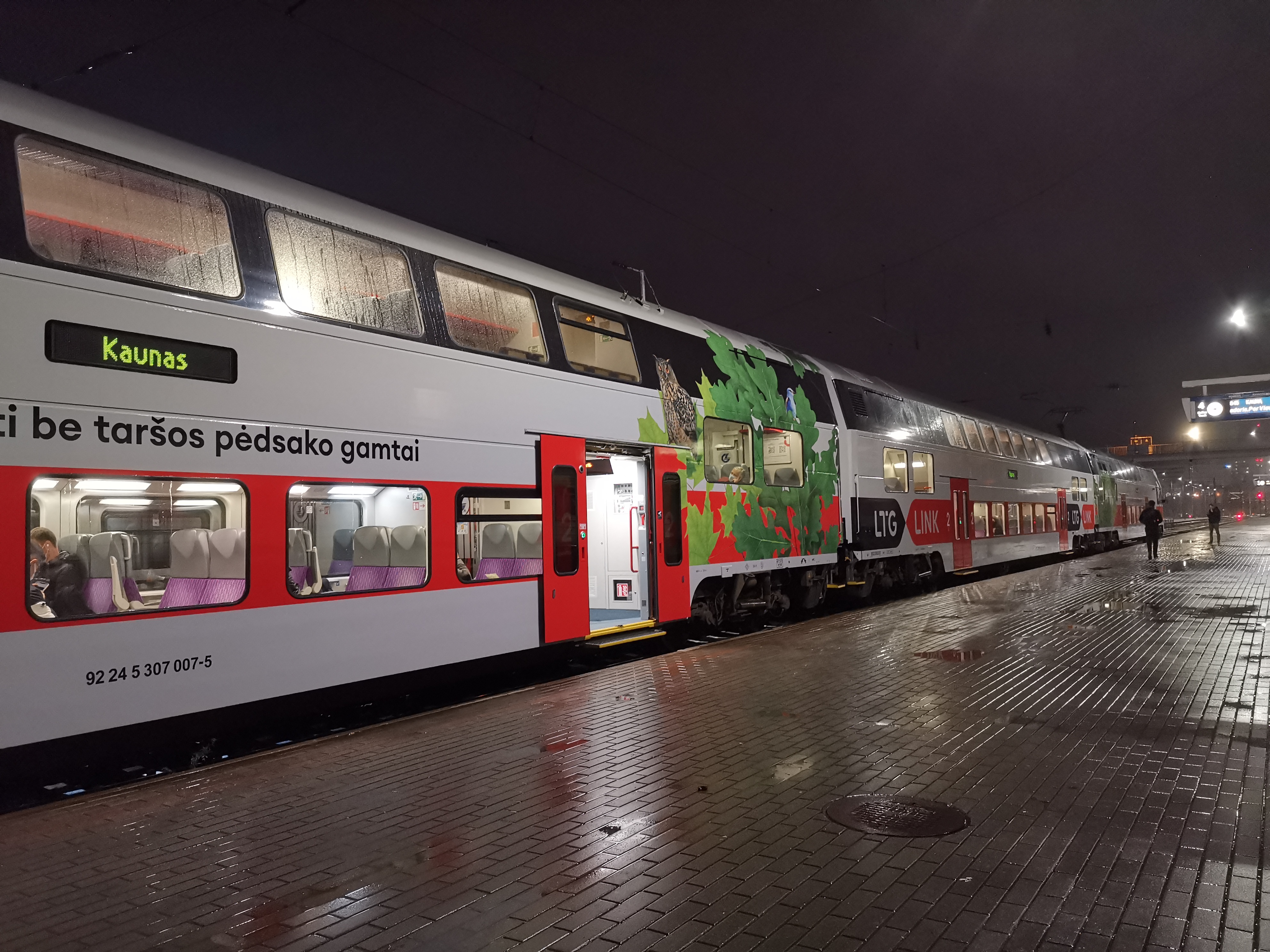
Škoda EJ 575

== Future plans ==
LTG Group is pursuing the electrification of LTG Link's main passenger routes, particularly the Vilnius–Klaipeda corridor, which handles a significant portion of Lithuania's passenger rail traffic. In 2019, LTG Infra awarded a €363.1 million contract to electrify 354 km of its network, increasing the electrified network share from 7% to 40% by 2023. This project includes both the 34 km Vilnius bypass and the 320 km Klaipeda–Kaišiadorys main line, and supports Lithuania's climate strategy by reducing the reliance on diesel-powered trains.

Following the electrification, LTG Link intends to introduce new electric passenger trains on the core network, moving existing diesel trains to regional routes. The company has engaged in discussions with train manufacturers as part of its fleet upgrade, including considerations for battery-electric trains for non-electrified routes.

LTG Link's strategic goals focus on expanding route coverage, improving service frequency, and enhancing passenger convenience. As part of a long-term plan, LTG Link aims to:

- Introduce new high-speed connections, particularly along international routes to Poland.
- Implement smart ticketing systems to streamline the passenger experience.
- Upgrade existing stations and expand Wi-Fi coverage to improve connectivity on board.
- Expand the fleet with new, modern Stadler trains, enhancing service on international and regional routes.

== Rail Baltica ==
On 18 March 2026, LTG Link, in cooperation with the Latvian passenger train operator ViVi and the Estonia passenger train operator Elron, announced a framework procurement for Rail Baltica regional passenger trains. Rail Baltica will procure European standard gauge trains with a speed of up to 200 km/h. The trains will have at least 200 seats, standard and business class; a quiet area; a family area; an area for animals. In addition, catering with a coffee machine, 2 toilets; high-speed internet (5G); 4 wheelchair spaces and 20 bicycle racks. Train length up to 106 meters. Estonia will initially purchase 5 trains with the option to purchase 2 additional trains, Latvia plans to purchase 5 train sets and Lithuania 8.

== See also ==
- Rail transport in Lithuania
- Vivi – operator in Latvia
- Elron – operator in Estonia
- Rail Baltica
