= Pesa 730M =

Polish diesel multiple unit

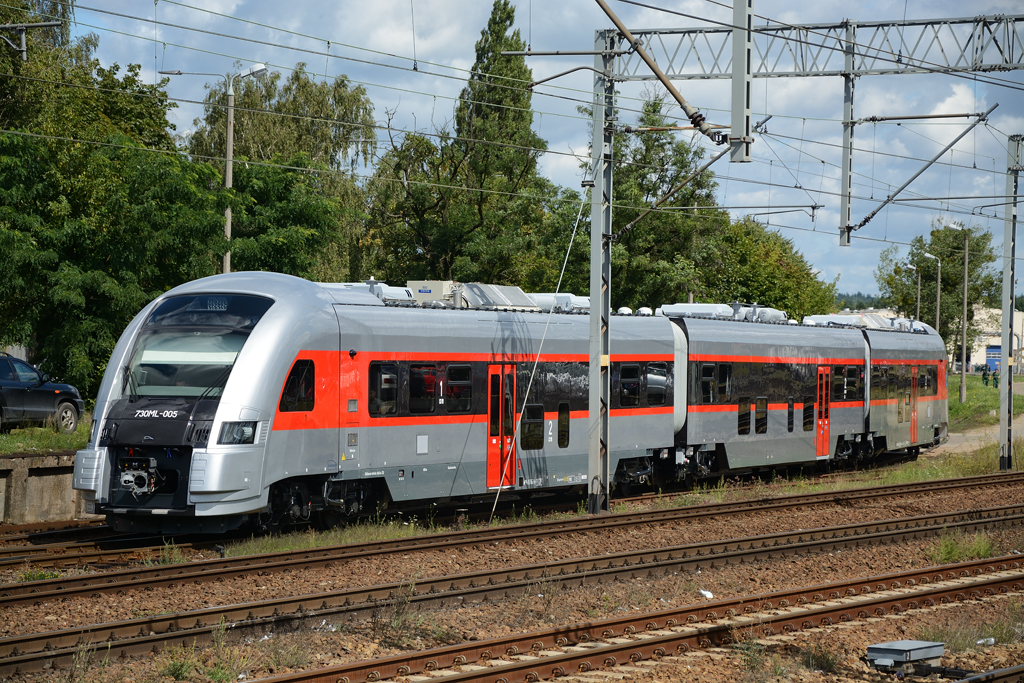
- Manufacturer: Pesa
- Constructed: 2013–2016
- Entered service: 2013
- Number built: 14
- Operator: Belarusian Railway; Lithuanian Railways

Specifications
- Train length: 69,350 mm (227 ft 6 in)
- Width: 3,200 mm (130 in)
- Height: 4,435 mm (174.6 in)
- Maximum speed: 156 km/h (97 mph)
- Track gauge: 1,520 mm (4 ft 11 27/32 in) Russian gauge

The Pesa 730M is a 3-unit diesel multiple unit predestined to be used on a wide track that is manufactured by Pesa in Poland, but actively used in Lithuania and Belarus.

Lithuanian Railways utilises Pesa 730ML trains on Vilnius–Klaipėda services and Vilnius–Riga–Valga services.

== Operators ==
| Country | Operator | Number of trains | Local name | year of commission | References |
|---|---|---|---|---|---|
| Belarus | Belarusian Railway | 7 | ДП3 | 2014 | |
| Lithuania | Lithuanian Railways | 7 | 730ML | 2016 | |
