= Vilnius–Kaunas Railway =

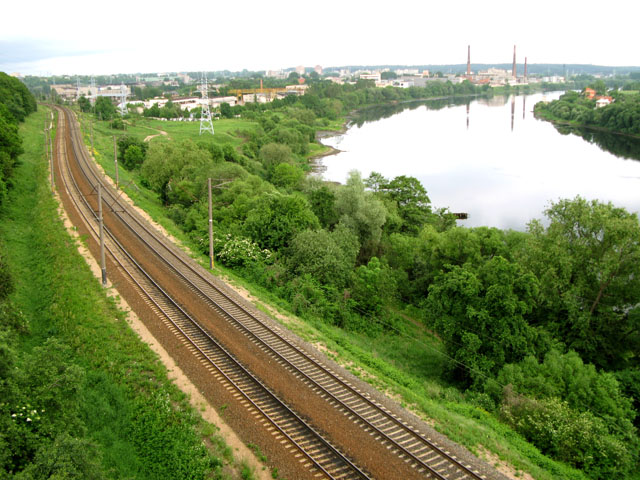
- The Vilnius–Kaunas railway line next to the River Neman in 2007

Overview
- Termini: Vilnius railway station; Kaunas railway station
- Stations: 9

Service
- Operator(s): Lithuanian Railways

History
- Opened: 1862

Technical
- Line length: 104 km (64.62 mi)
- Track gauge: 1,520 mm (4 ft 11 27/32 in) Russian gauge
- Electrification: 1975
Route map
The Vilnius–Kaunas railway line shown on a map of the Lithuanian rail network

The Vilnius–Kaunas railway line (Lithuanian: Vilniaus–Kauno geležinkelis) is a 104 km (64.62 mi) long railway line in central and south-eastern Lithuania which connects Lithuania's capital Vilnius with its second largest city Kaunas. Being one of the main arteries of the Lithuanian rail network, the broad-gauge railway is fully electrified and has double track (except for the section in the Kaunas railway tunnel).

== History ==
The railway construction was started in 1859 and finished in 1862.

== Incidents ==
On 4 April 1975, around 20 people died and at least 80 people were injured in the Žasliai railway disaster. On 6 November 1994, the Bražuolė bridge bombing damaged one of the railway bridges, but derailment of trains was avoided.

== Stations ==
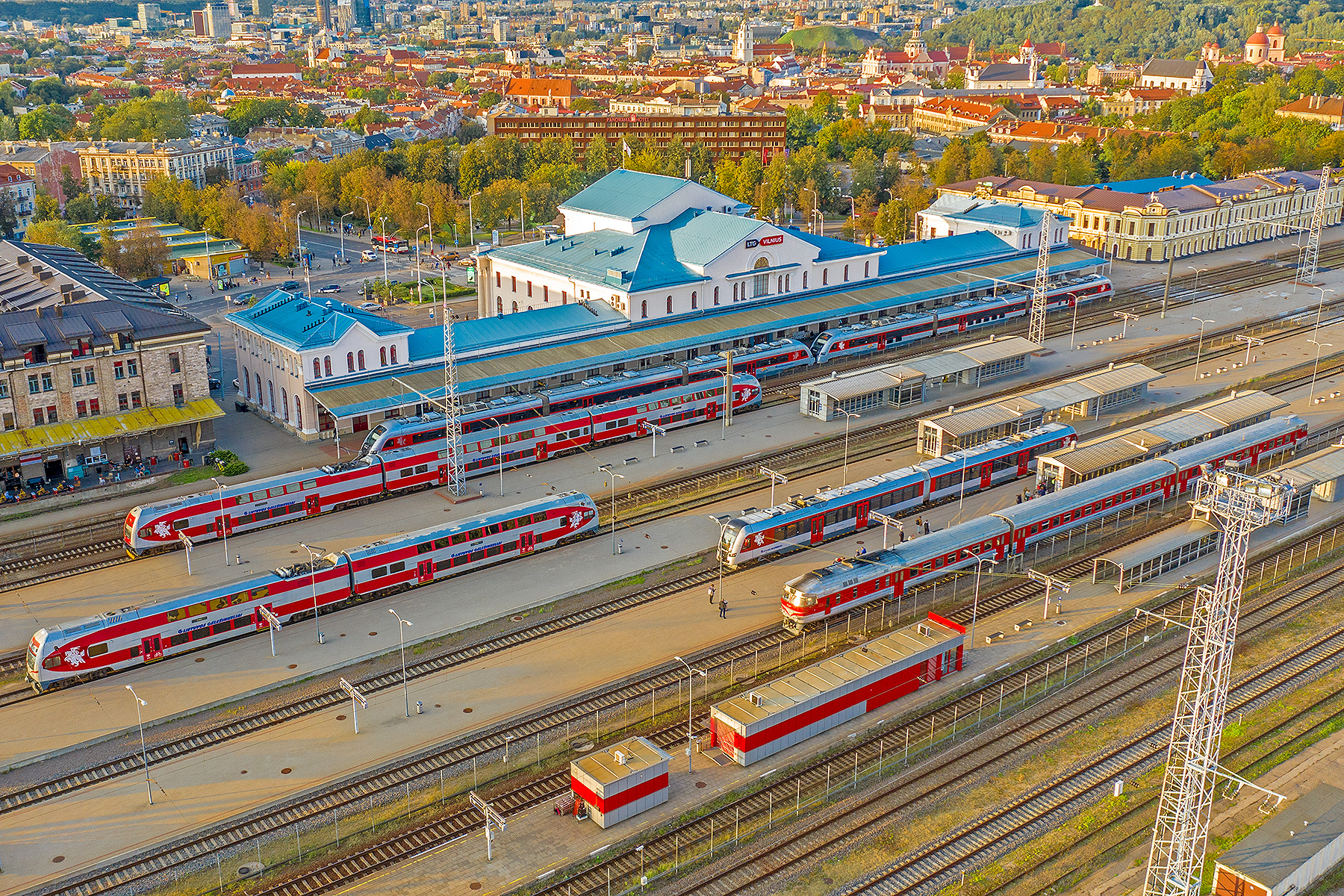
Vilnius train station

- Vilnius railway station
- Paneriai railway station
- Lentvaris railway station
- Vievis railway station
- Žasliai railway station
- Kaišiadorys railway station
- Pravieniškės railway station
- Palemonas railway station
- Kaunas railway station
