= Klaipėda railway station =

Railway station in Klaipėda, Lithuania

Klaipėda
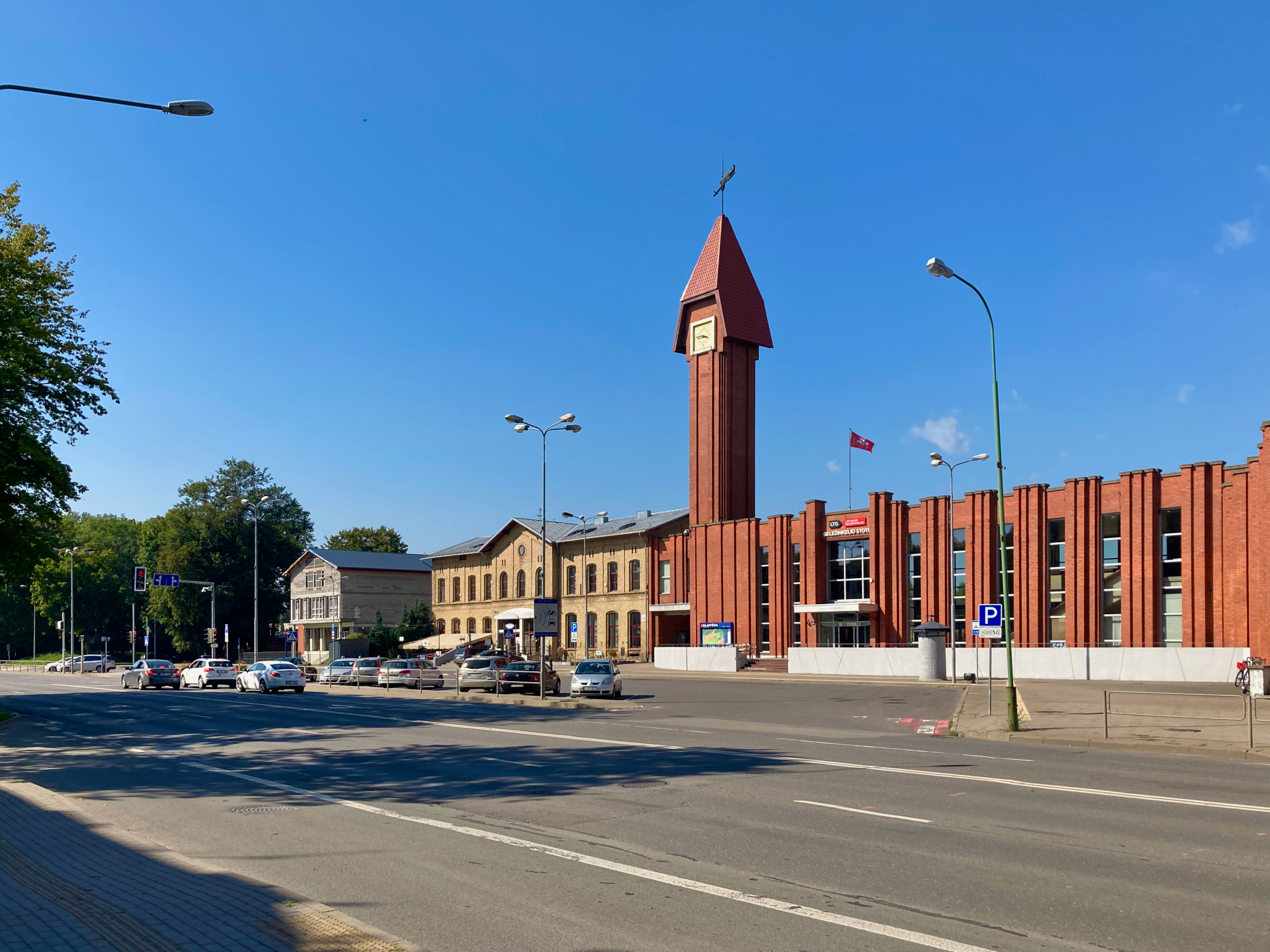

General information
- Location: Priestočio g. 1, Klaipėda
- Coordinates: 55°43′15″N 21°08′05″E
- Owner: Lithuanian Railways

Other information
- Station code: (IATA: XJK)

History
- Opened: 1881; 1983 (expanded)
Location
- Location within Lithuania

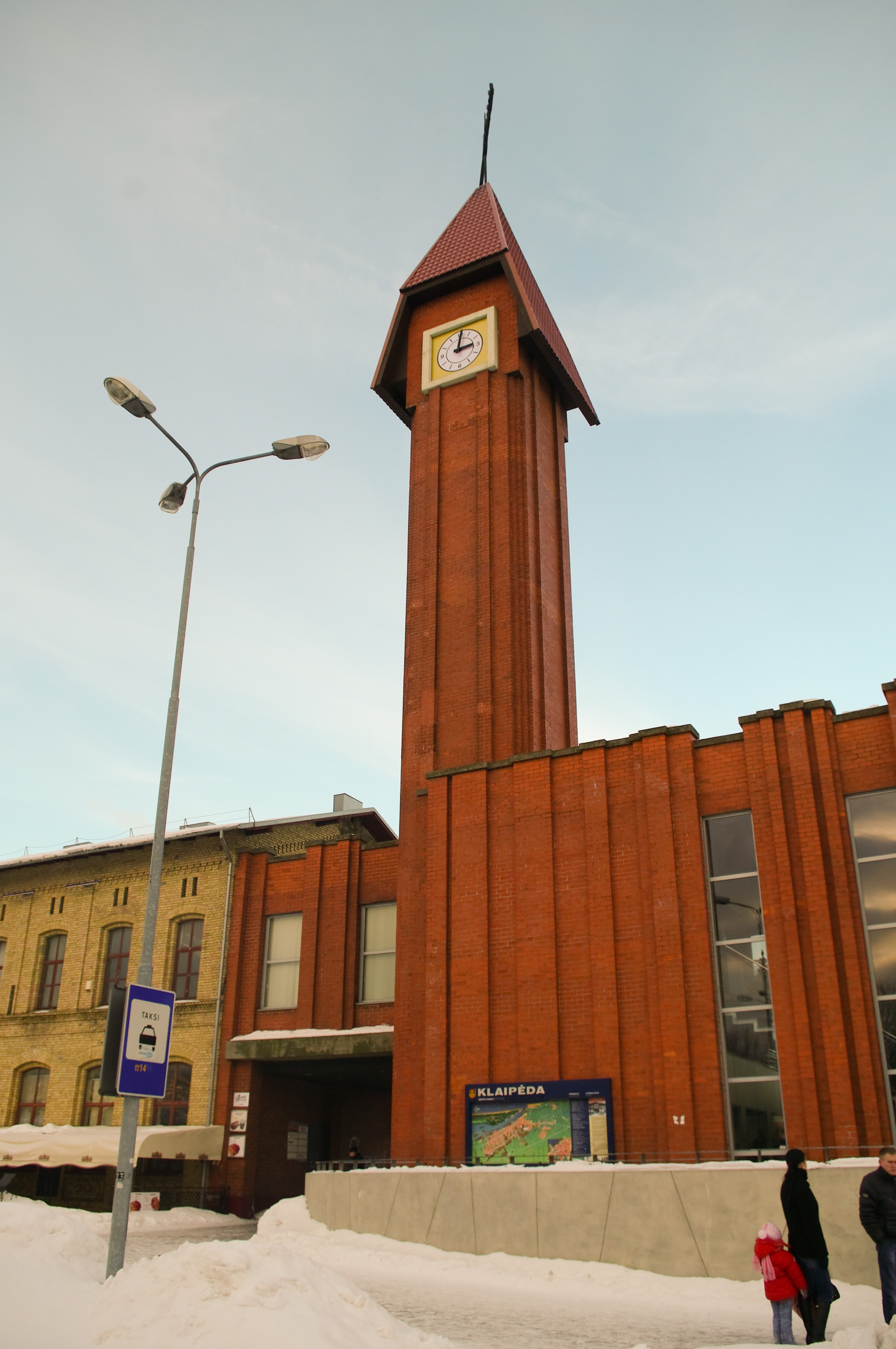

Klaipėda railway station (Lithuanian: Klaipėdos geležinkelio stotis) is a Lithuanian Railways station in Klaipėda. It is located at the northern part of the old town of the city. The current building was built in 1983. "Railroad station - a facility comprising ticket office, platforms, etc. for loading and unloading train passengers and freight".

== History and architecture ==
The complex of buildings of Klaipėda railway station consists of two buildings. The old building made of yellow bricks and reflecting features of Classicism architecture was built in 1881. Nowadays commercial enterprises and cafeterias are used in this building.

The new building made of red bricks was built in 1983. Currently the main residency of Lithuanian Railways is established in this building.

In the beginning, in 1878, only cargo trains used to carried fish and timber, their routes stations were Klaipėda-Šilutė and Klaipėda-Šilutė-Pagėgiai.

Map of the Lithuanian railway network

== See also ==
- Railway stations in Lithuania
- Rail transport in Lithuania
- Transport in Lithuania
