= Rail transport in Lithuania =

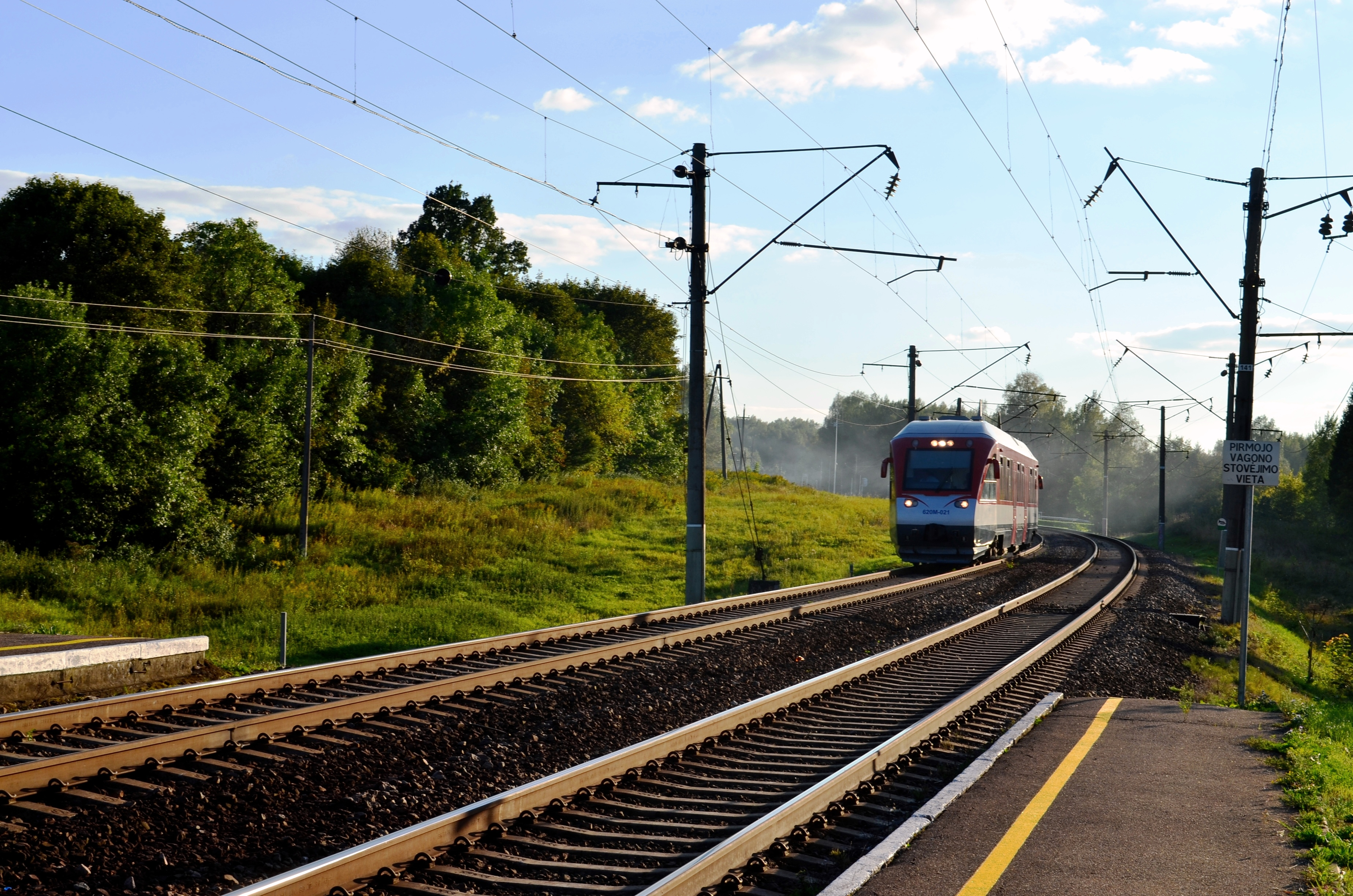
- Train near Vilnius

Operation
- National railway: Lietuvos Geležinkeliai (LTG)

Statistics
- Ridership: 5.5 million (2019)
- Passenger-distance: 359 million (2019)
- Freight: 16,181 million tkm (2019)

System length
- Total: 1,910 km (1,190 mi)
- Double track: 459 km (285 mi)
- Electrified: 519 km (322 mi)

Track gauge
- Main: 1,520 mm (4 ft 11 27/32 in); 1,435 mm (4 ft 8 1/2 in)
- 1520 mm: 1,745.8 km (1,084.8 mi)
- 1435 mm: 123 km (76 mi)
- 750 mm: 68.4 km (42.5 mi)

Electrification
- Main: 25 kV AC, 50 Hz

Features
- Longest tunnel: Kaunas Railway Tunnel, 1,285 m (4,216 ft)
- No. of bridges: 410
- Longest bridge: Lyduvėnai Bridge, 599 m (1,965 ft)
- No. of stations: 104 (or 164 if including all stops)
Map

Rail transport in Lithuania consists of freight shipments and passenger services. The construction of the first railway line in Lithuania began in 1859. As of 2021, the total length of railways in Lithuania was 1,868.8 km (1,161.2 mi). LTG Group (Lietuvos Geležinkeliai), the national state-owned railway company, operates most of the country's passenger and freight services via its subsidiaries LTG Link (passenger) and LTG Cargo (freight).

The country has a mixed gauge network: the majority is broad gauge (a legacy of the Russian standard) with new lines often using standard gauge or dual gauge track. In 2020, Lithuania together with the other Baltic states began construction of the Rail Baltica high-speed rail with operating speed of 249 km/h for the passenger trains. The project marks a new era for Lithuanian railways and is expected to be completed by 2030.

Lithuania is a member of the Intergovernmental Organisation for International Carriage by Rail (OTIF) and International Union of Railways (UIC). The UIC Country Code for Lithuania is 24. As an EU member, the country participates in the European Union Agency for Railways. It is also a member of Interrail. Lithuania was ranked 16th among national European rail systems in the European Railway Performance Index 2017 assessing intensity of use, quality of service and safety.

== History ==
In 1851, the government of the Russian Empire decided to build the Saint Petersburg–Warsaw railway. The construction of the railway in Lithuania began in 1859 and the line included Daugavpils–Vilnius–Grodno and Lentvaris–Kaunas–Virbalis sections which were completed in 1862. The first train arrived from Daugavpils (in Latvia) to Vilnius on 17 September 1860. However, the first commercial operation began between Kaunas temporary station on the left bank of the river Nemunas and Eydtkuhnen in East Prussia on 11 April 1861. Initially, there were 21 Lithuanian stations. Building of the railway required different engineering solutions, including the construction of Kaunas Railway Tunnel and Paneriai Tunnel. The greatest expansion of the railway happened during 1857–1914 when nearly two thirds of the network, used at the end of 20th century, was constructed. The railway construction had a significant impact to the economic development of the region.

When the Imperial German Army occupied Lithuania in 1915, the railway became the main way to supply food and ammunition for the German army. During this time, Germans replaced a lot of the 1524 mm gauge railways track with the 1435 mm standard gauge. In various parts of the country, the German army also constructed 600 mm gauge tracks. Lithuanian independence was restored in 1918 and the Lithuanian government concluded an agreement with Germany on 4 July 1919 on the handover of the railway assets to the Ministry of Transport. During the years after World War I, Lithuanian Railways reconstructed the tracks, connecting them into a complete network. In 1923, the Klaipėda region became part of the restored Lithuanian state, so the port of Klaipėda became a part of the Lithuanian railway system. The interwar period was marked by the expansion of the narrow gauge railways which contributed to the economic development of the rural areas, especially in the north-eastern Lithuania.

In 1940, following the Soviet occupation, railway activities were reorganized and all agreements concluded by Lithuania with neighbouring countries terminated. Soviets changed most of the network from the standard gauge to broad gauge. The railway gauge was again changed by Nazi occupying force in 1941 and then once again changed back by the Soviets in 1944. After the World War II, the railway network required significant repairs. The Soviets also replaced a lot of the narrow gauge railway with the broad gauge and, in fact, completely dismantled 400 kilometres (250 mi) of it. During the Soviet occupation all railways in the Baltic states were managed from Riga. The first electric train began service on 29 December 1975 after the electrification of the Vilnius–Kaunas line.

Following the independence restoration in 1991, Lithuania restored its membership in international rail transport organizations, established national railway company Lietuvos geležinkeliai AB and began gradual modernization of its railway network. In 2000s, that included speed improvements (up to 160 km/h — passenger trains, 120 km/h — freight trains), modern communication and safety systems (GSM-R and ERTMS), new trains and locomotives (manufactured by Siemens, Pesa, Škoda). In 2020, the construction of the high-speed Rail Baltica began.

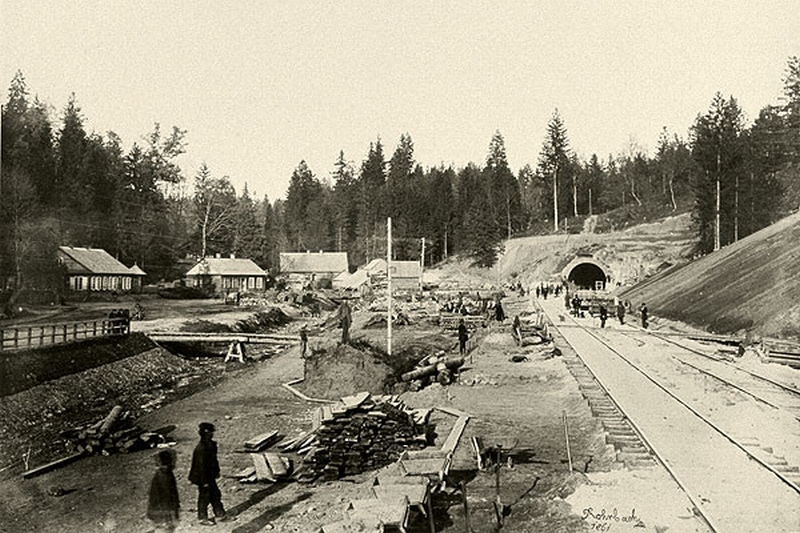
Construction of Kaunas Railway Tunnel, 19th century

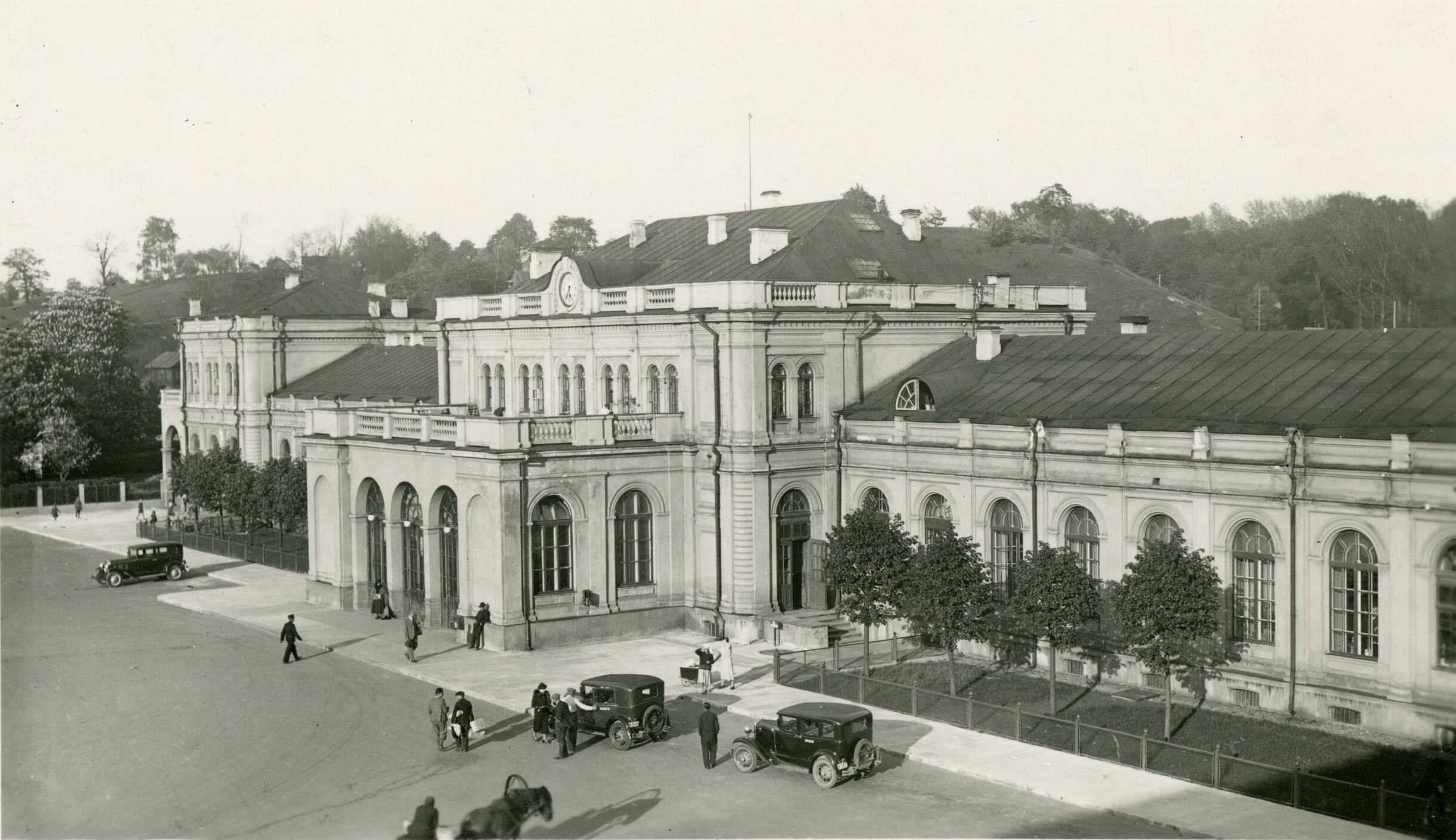
Kaunas railway station in 1933

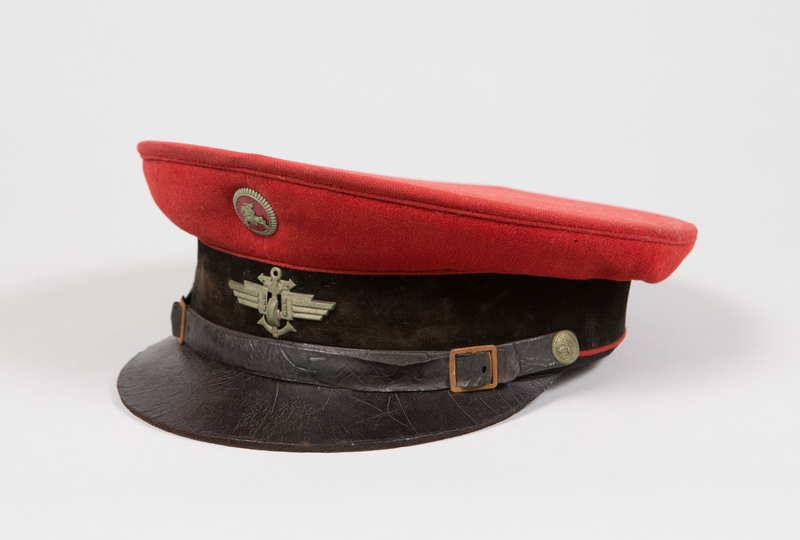
The hat of a watchman of a Lithuanian railway station in 1937

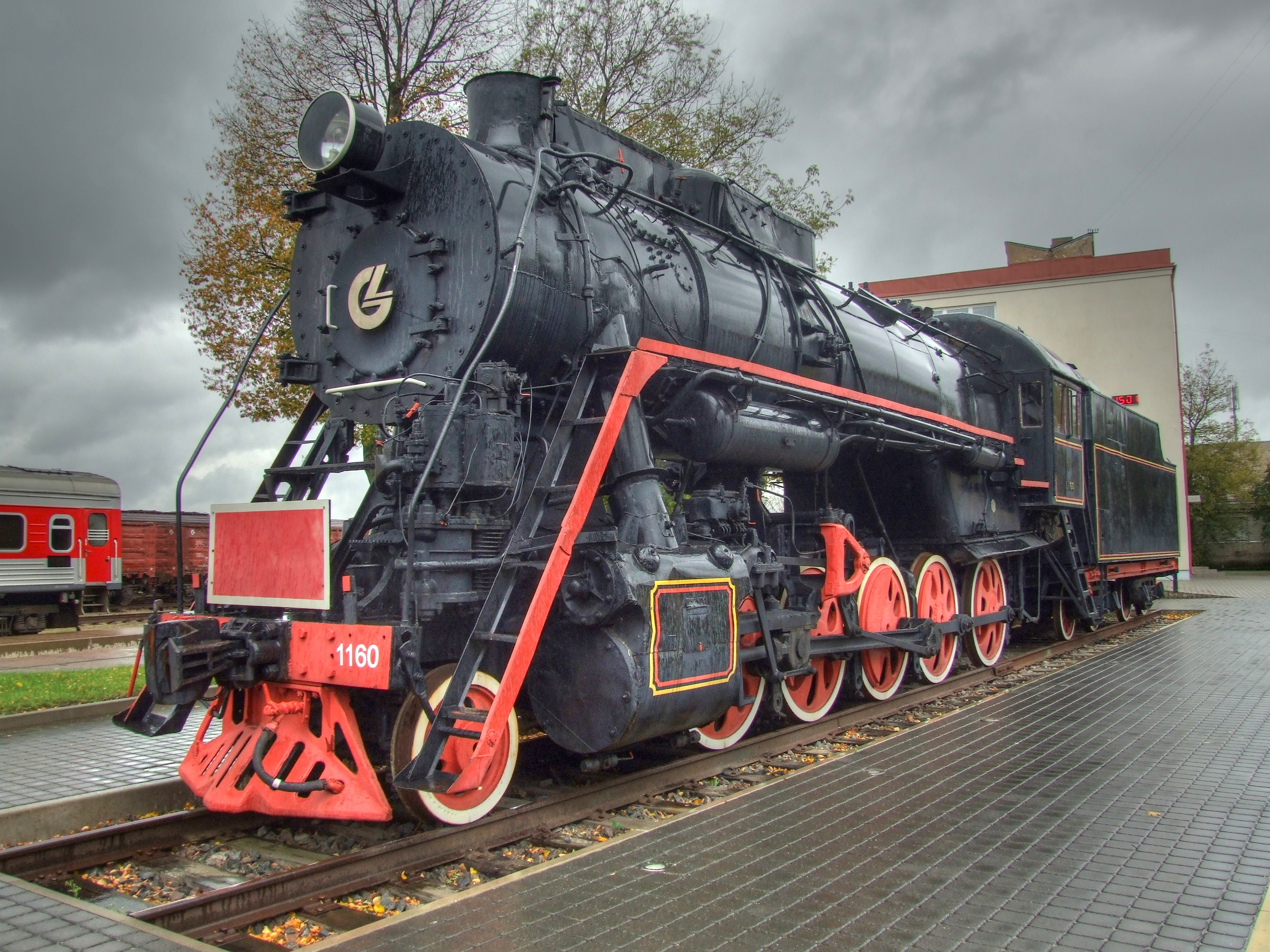
L-1160 steam locomotive in Klaipėda railway station

=== Trams ===
In late 19th and early 20th centuries, some Lithuanian cities used the wagonways i.e. trams pulled by horses which were colloquially called "konkė". Kaunas had one wagonway line from 1892 until 1929. Vilnius had three wagonway lines from 1893 to 1925 using the metre-gauge railway. The wagonways lost popularity due to the emergence of buses and cars. Vilnius, however, briefly had a diesel tramway with a sole line between 1924 and 1926 and Kaunas had a narrow gauge passenger line of steam tramway, called kukushka before 1935. During the interwar period there were plans to revive electric tramways both in Vilnius and Kaunas, but they never materialized. Klaipėda, on the other hand, had an electric tramway with 2 active lines from 1904 to 1934. It was revived again in 1950 but due to the lack of popularity closed in 1967. In 2024 a public transport feasibility study took place in Kaunas which concluded that a tramway would be suitable for the city.

== Services ==
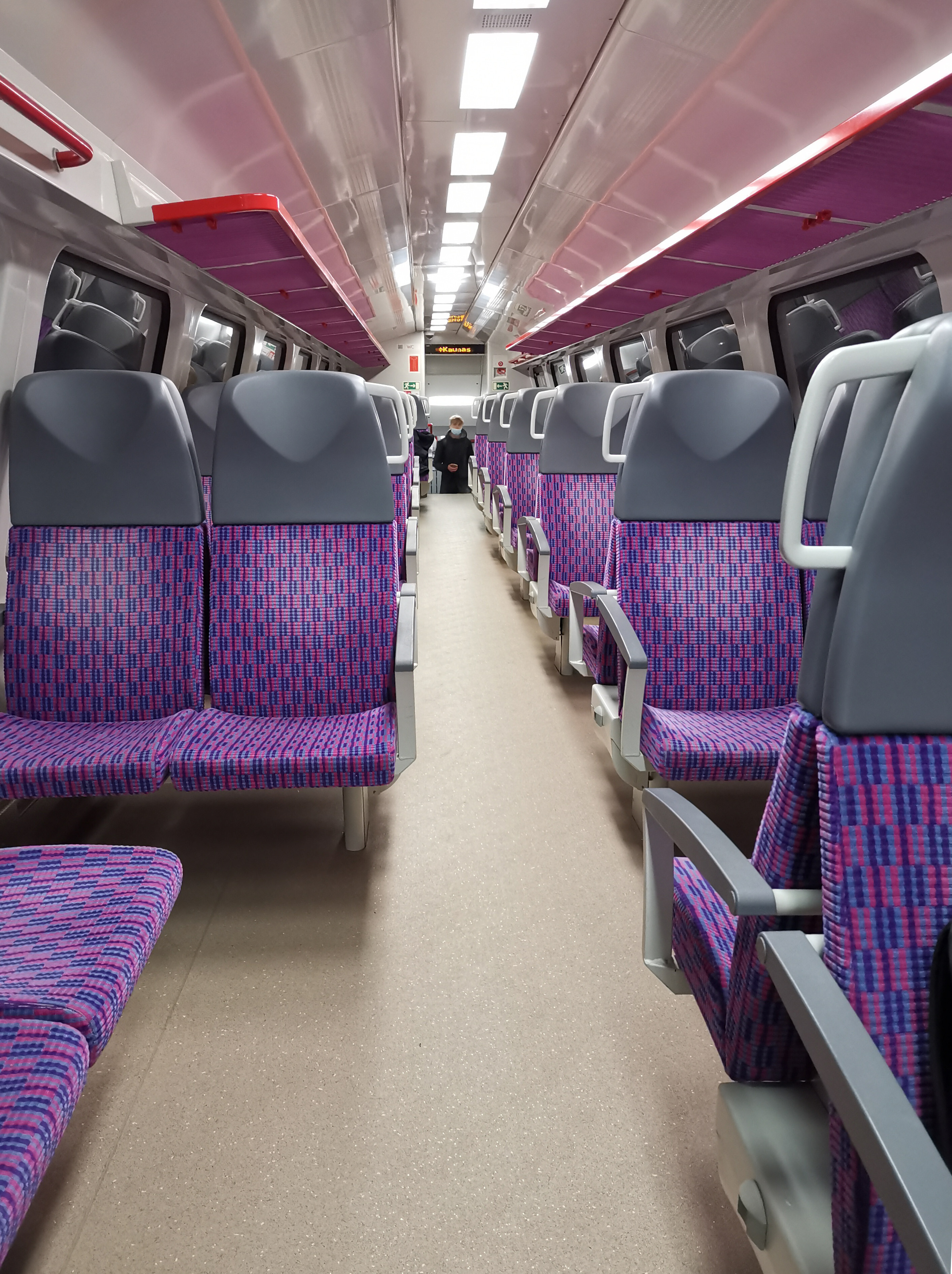
LTG Link service Vilnius–Kaunas, interior of second class in the Škoda EJ575 train

National state-owned railway company Lietuvos Geležinkeliai (LTG) provides most of the rail services through its subsidiary companies: LTG Link provides passenger services, while LTG Cargo provides freight service. Another subsidiary, LTG Infra, is responsible for the maintenance and development of the infrastructure.

Passenger and freight rail transport statistics
Year	1950	1960	1970	1980	1990	2000	2010	2020	2021	2022
Passenger km (in mln)	815	1,268	2,093	3,199	3,640	611	373	260	301	432
Freight tkm (in bln)	2.1	6.8	13.5	18.2	19.2	8.9	13.4	15.9	14.6	7.4

=== Passenger transport ===
Main lines:

- Vilnius–Kaunas, 104 km (65 mi), first built in 1862, electrified in 1975. The fastest train takes 69 minutes, but following the Rail Baltica project completion, the travel time will be reduced to 38 minutes.
- Vilnius–Klaipėda, 376 km (234 mi), part of the line first built in 1870, electrified in 2026.

International lines:

- Vilnius–Riga, 348 km (216 mi), available since late 2023 and takes 4 hours 15 minutes.
- Vilnius–Warsaw–Krakow, available since late 2022. Indirect route due to change of gauge at Polish border, transfer from LTG Link train to PKP Intercity at Mockava. Vilnius–Warsaw travel time around 9 hours.

The old fleet of passenger trains included the ER9M electric train; D1, DR1A/DR1AM and AR2 diesel multiple units; TEP60/TEP70/TEP70BS and M62/2M62/2M62U diesel locomotives. Some are still in service, but the vast majority are retired.

As of 2021, the main passenger train models include Škoda EJ575 (electric) and diesel Pesa 620M/630M/730ML as well as some RA2 trains. A public procurement was launched in 2021 to replace all diesel passenger trains with a fleet of new electric trains. In 2023, LTG Link signed a contract with the Swiss Stadler Rail company for a delivery of 15 new Stadler FLIRT electric and battery-electric trains. The contract also provides an option for another 39 trains. The first train was delivered in late 2025.

=== Freight transport ===
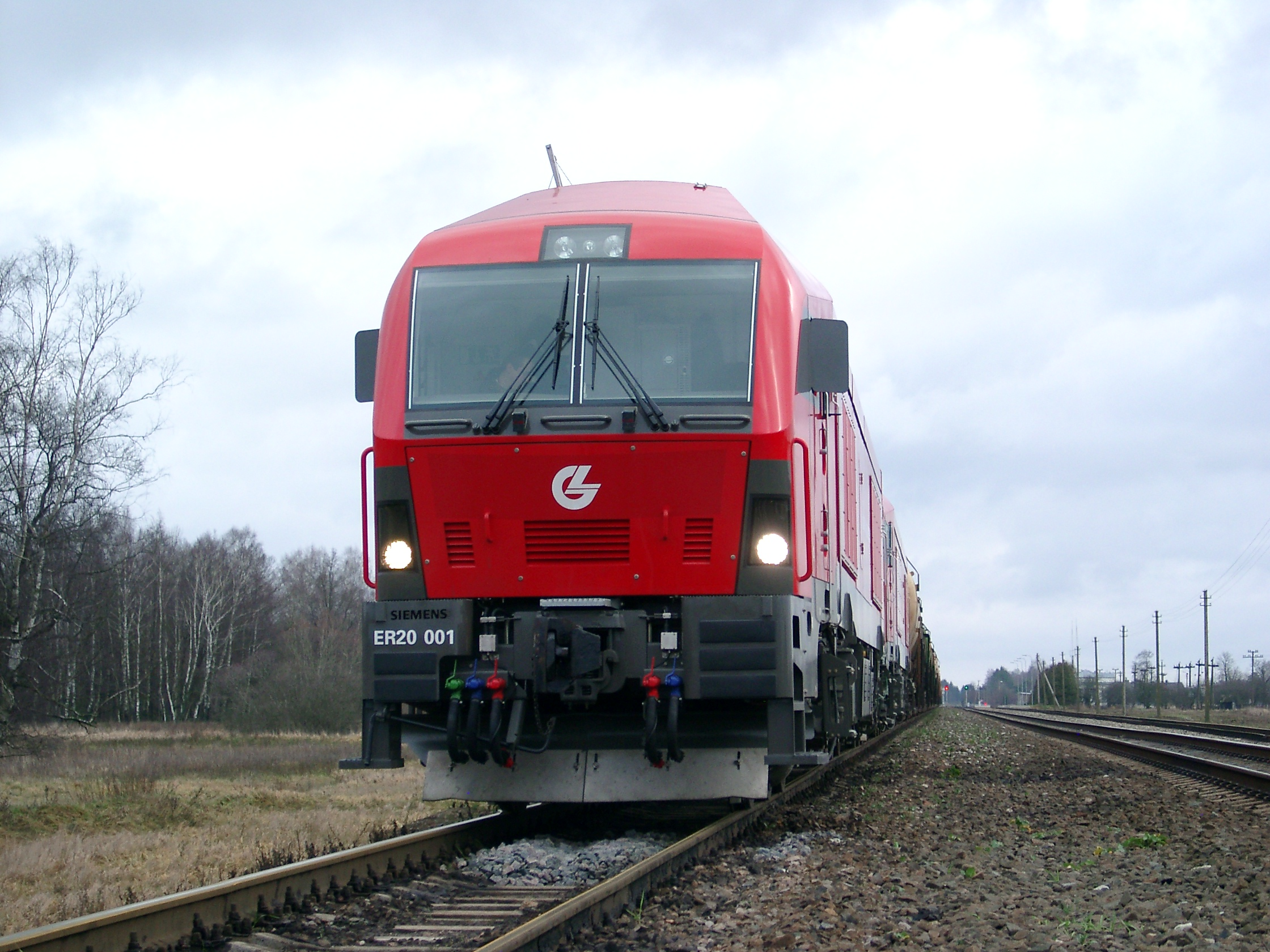
Siemens ER20CF locomotive operated by LTG Cargo

As of 2021, Lithuania has three intermodal terminals:

- Kaunas Intermodal Terminal with annual capacity of 102,000 TEU and dual gauge railway;
- Vilnius Intermodal Terminal, 102,000 TEU, broad gauge railway only;
- Šeštokai Intermodal Terminal, 25,000 TEU, dual gauge.

LTG Cargo company provides freight transportation corridors for or between the following regions:

- Western/Northern Europe and Lithuania, primarily Kaunas Intermodal Terminal. Currently, there are regular Kaunas–Tilburg (Netherlands) and Kaunas–Kaldenkirchen (Germany) freight trains.
- All three Baltic states with a corridor from/to Poland. "Amber Train" project currently provides Kaunas–Riga–Tallinn (Muuga) service. LTG Cargo Polska (subsidiary in Poland) offers transportation from Šeštokai near the Polish border.
- The Baltic Sea region (primarily Scandinavia) and the Black Sea region, primarily Turkey and Caucasus, via Ukraine. "Viking Train" and "Baltic Ukraine Shuttle" are the international projects which enable Klaipėda–Minsk–Kyiv–Odesa transportation corridor between the Port of Klaipėda and the Port of Odesa.
- The EU market, as Lithuania is a member, and China via the CIS countries. Lithuania aims to expand its involvement in the New Silk Road and become one of the transport hubs. However, due to strained political relations, the expansion remains uncertain.

LTG Cargo primarily uses Siemens ER20 "Eurorunner" locomotives for the freight trains.

== Network ==
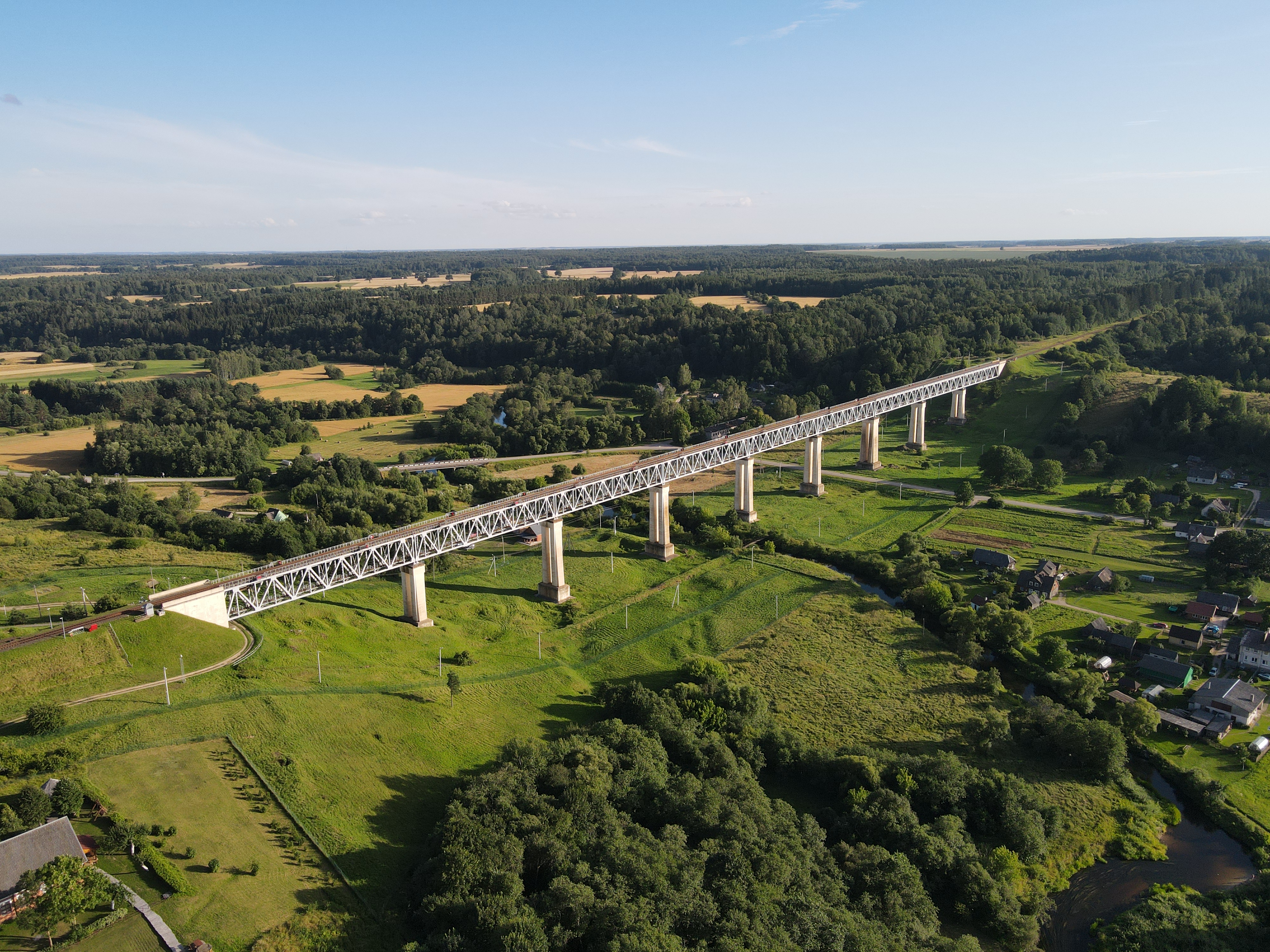
Bridge in Lyduvėnai is the longest and the highest railway bridge in Lithuania and the Baltic states

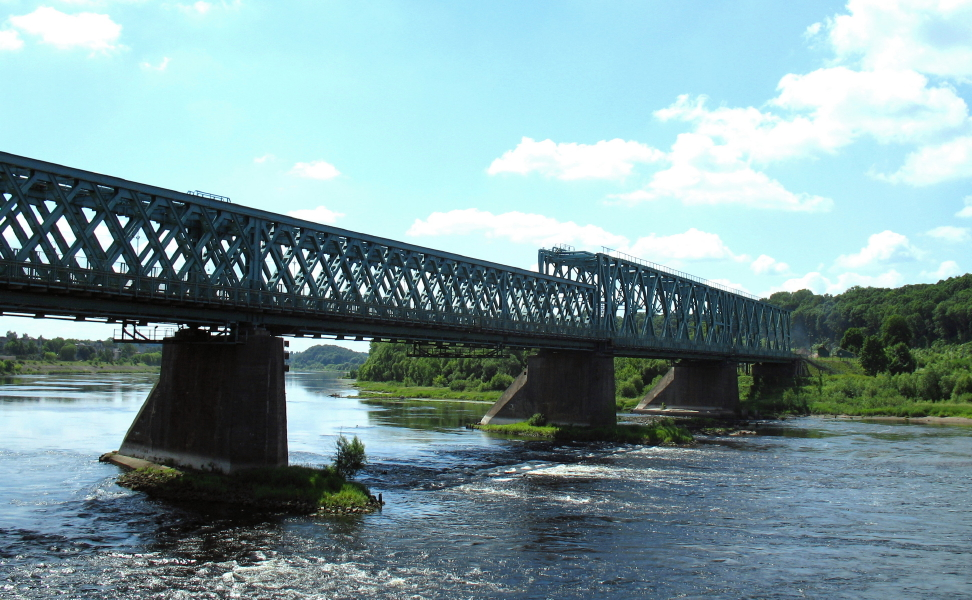
Bridge in Kaunas

As of 2021, there is a total of 1,910 km (1,190 mi) of railways:

- Single-track — 1,448 kilometres (900 mi) (of which 519 kilometres (322 mi) electrified)
- Double-track — 459 kilometres (285 mi) (of which 5 kilometres (3.1 mi) electrified)
- Triple-track — 2 kilometres (1.2 mi)
- Total electrified — 519 kilometres (322 mi)

Length by track gauge:

- 1,520 mm (4 ft 11 27/32 in) broad gauge — 1,790 kilometres (1,110 mi)
- 1,435 mm (4 ft 8 1/2 in) standard gauge — 123 kilometres (76 mi)
- 750 mm (2 ft 5 1/2 in) narrow gauge — 68.4 kilometres (42.5 mi)

Line between Mockava and Šeštokai uses dual gauge supporting both the broad and standard gauge.

=== Electrification ===
Lithuania uses 25 kV 50 Hz AC for the electrified railway lines. This will remain compatible with the technical requirements for the Rail Baltica high-speed rail. The electrification was first implemented in 1975 for the Vilnius–Kaunas line. This was followed by the electrification of Vilnius–Naujoji Vilnia, Vilnius–Trakai lines and, since 2017, Vilnius–Minsk line. In 2026, a major project electrifying the Vilnius–Klaipėda line was completed.

As of 2026, 28% of the railways in Lithuania are electrified. Major electrification projects have been carried out and the operator aims to achieve 50% electrification in the long term. In 2019, a joint consortium of Spanish companies Elecnor and Abengoa was awarded a contract to carry out electrification of 730 km (450 mi) of railway. In October 2022, a contract was awarded to ABB to supply 25kV AC electrification system. It primarily includes the electrification of the Vilnius–Klaipėda line and a bypass rail around Vilnius. The electrification of the Vilnius–Klaipėda line was completed in 2026. In 2020, LTG set itself a long-term goal of achieving zero CO_{2} emissions by 2030.

In 2021, LTG Link announced the public procurement to acquire 30 electric trains in order to replace the existing diesel fleet. In June 2023, LTG Link ordered 15 FLIRT multiple-units and plans to procure up to 13 additional FLIRT inter-city EMUs, 15 battery-electric FLIRT trains with a 100 km range and 11 battery-electric FLIRT multiple-units with a 70 km range. The first FLIRT train deliveries began in late 2025. These trains entered service in late 2026.

=== Narrow-gauge ===
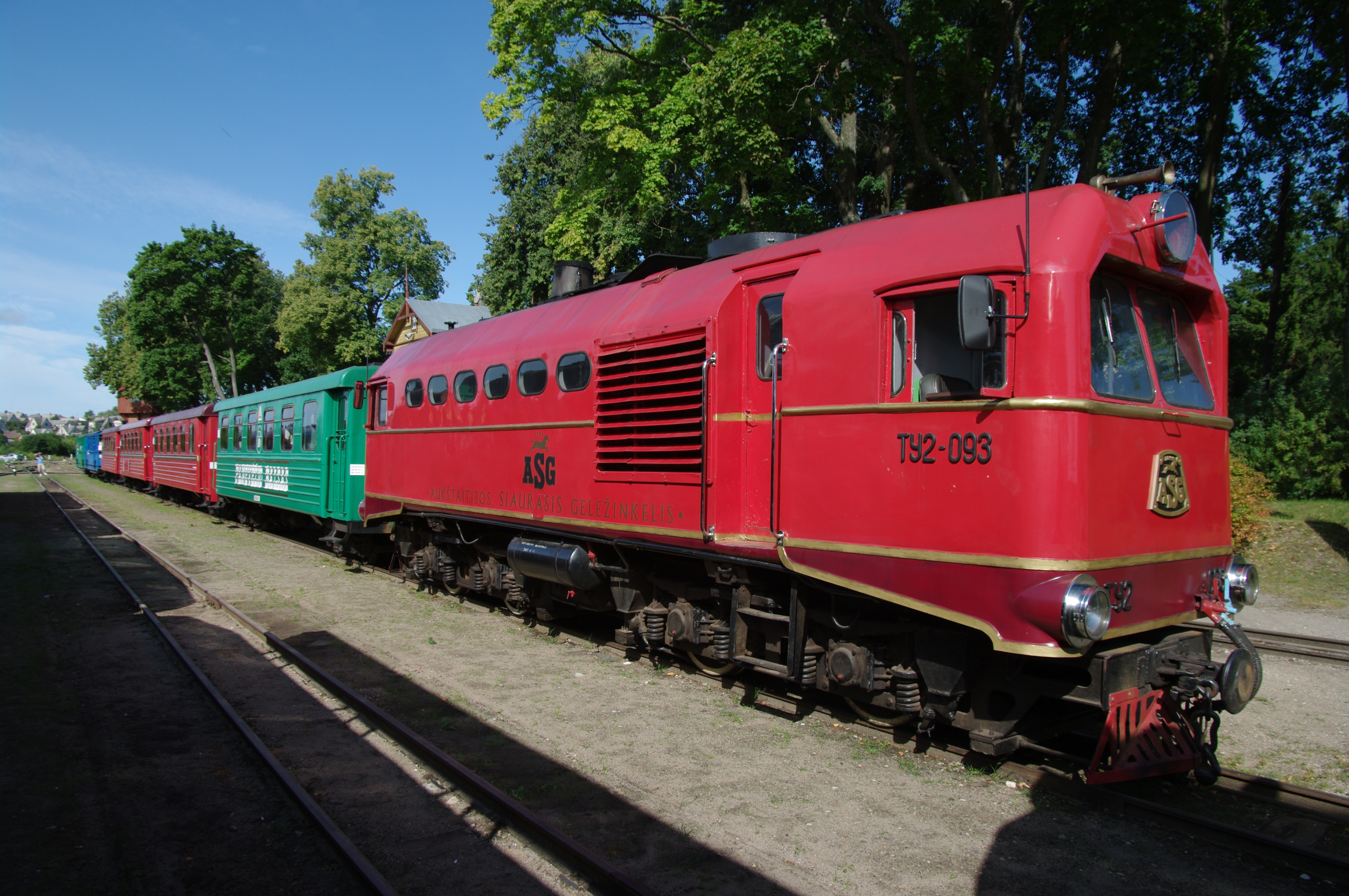
TU2 diesel locomotive on the narrow gauge track in Anykščiai

Lithuania has a narrow gauge line of 750 mm (2 ft 5 1/2 in) first constructed in 1891. It was built as a cheaper alternative to the wider gauge railway. In 1996, the narrow gauge railway was declared a heritage railway and, in 2003, the Panevėžys–Anykščiai–Rubikiai line was included into the national list of preserved cultural heritages. The total length of the preserved railway is 179 km (111 mi). Today, the active part of the railway is 68.4 km (42.5 mi), making it one of the longest narrow gauge lines in Europe.

In 2001, Aukštaitija narrow gauge railway was established as a separate company (independent from the Lithuanian Railways) to manage the narrow gauge railway. It primarily runs services for tourism and entertainment. It operates tourist trains ran by the TU2 diesel locomotives.

=== Future expansion ===
Rail Baltica is an ongoing greenfield railway infrastructure project that will link all Baltic states, including Lithuania, Poland and, eventually, Finland. Being a part of the Trans-European Transport Networks (TEN-T), it is a priority project of the European Union. It will introduce standard-gauge high-speed rail with an operating speed of 249 km/h for passenger trains. As of 2023, project completion is scheduled for 2030, with a start of services on some sections in 2028.

In Lithuania, 392 km (244 mi) of new track will be constructed, including reconstruction of the Vilnius–Kaunas Railway to support standard gauge. High speed rail will reduce the Vilnius–Kaunas route time to 38 minutes. At project completion, the following routes will become available or faster (with projected travel times):

- Vilnius–Warsaw (4:07)
- Vilnius–Riga (1:54, while currently it is 4:15)
- Vilnius–Tallinn (3:38)

As of 2021, the project is in progress with major construction ongoing in Lithuania. The standard gauge line between the Polish border and Kaunas has been built, with freight services already operating between Germany and Kaunas Intermodal Terminal as well as passenger train service between Kaunas and Białystok. Construction work for the line between Kaunas and the Latvian border was expected to begin in 2021.

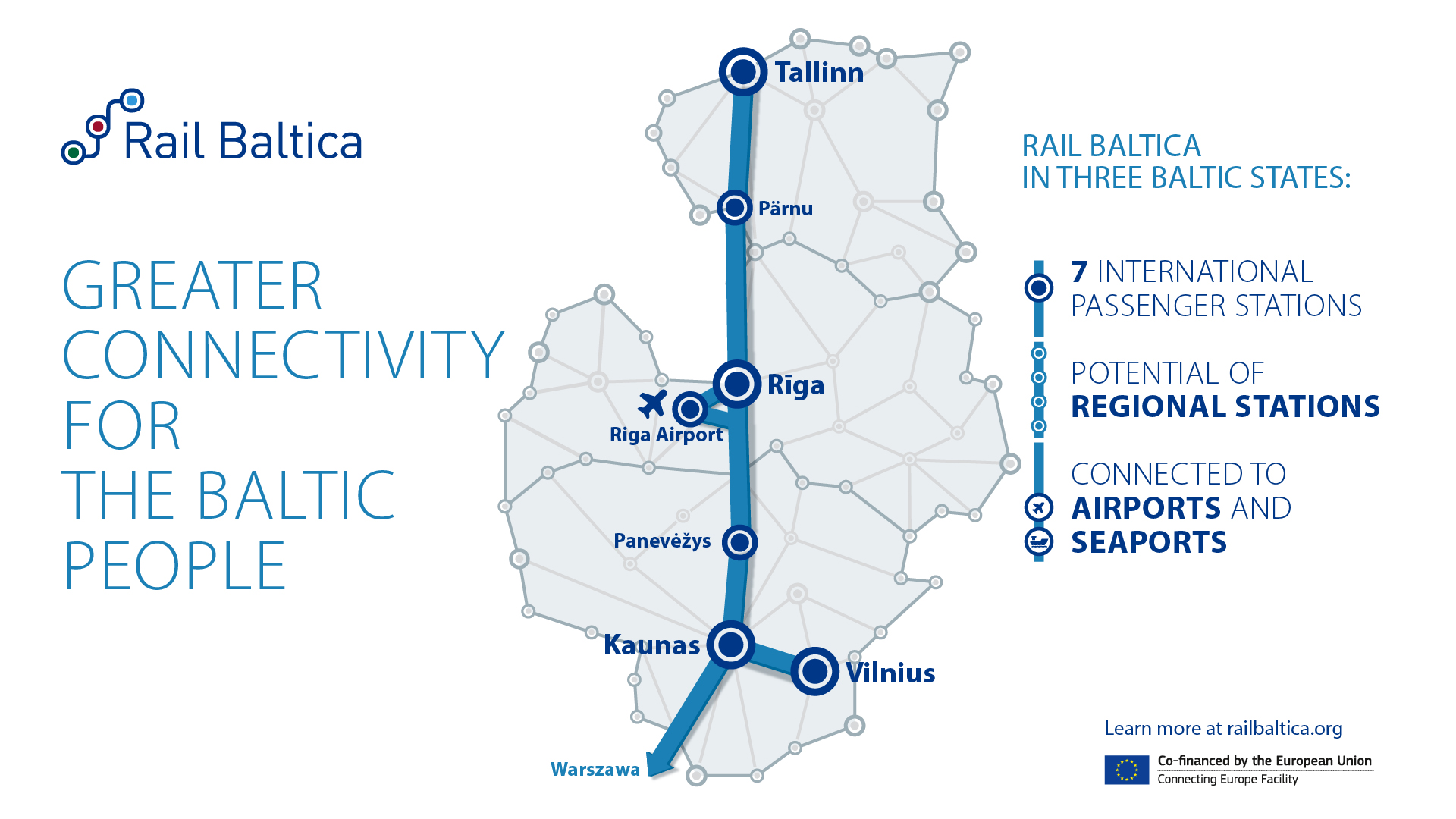
Map of Rail Baltica with the main stations

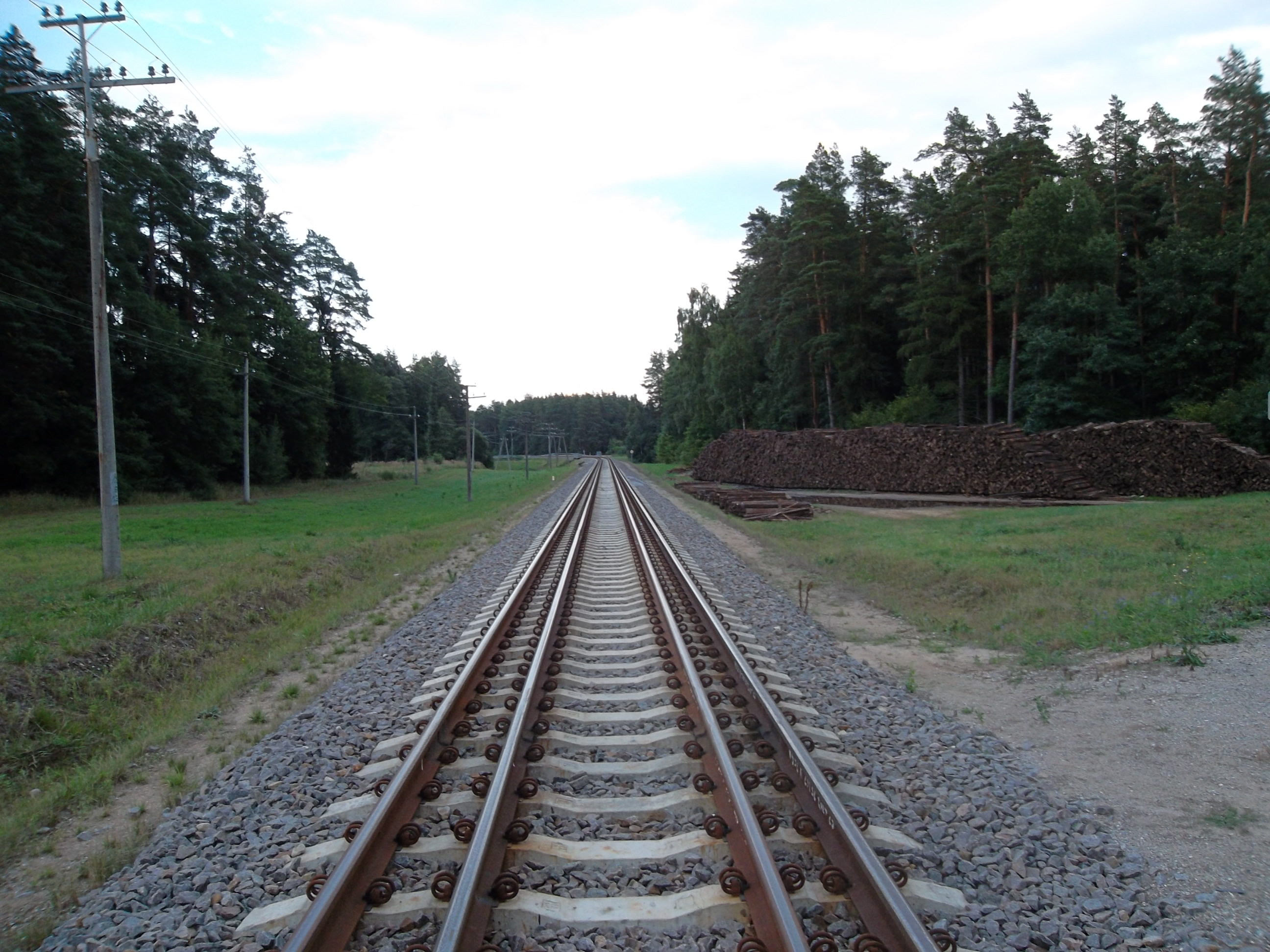
Dual gauge track between Mockava and Šeštokai

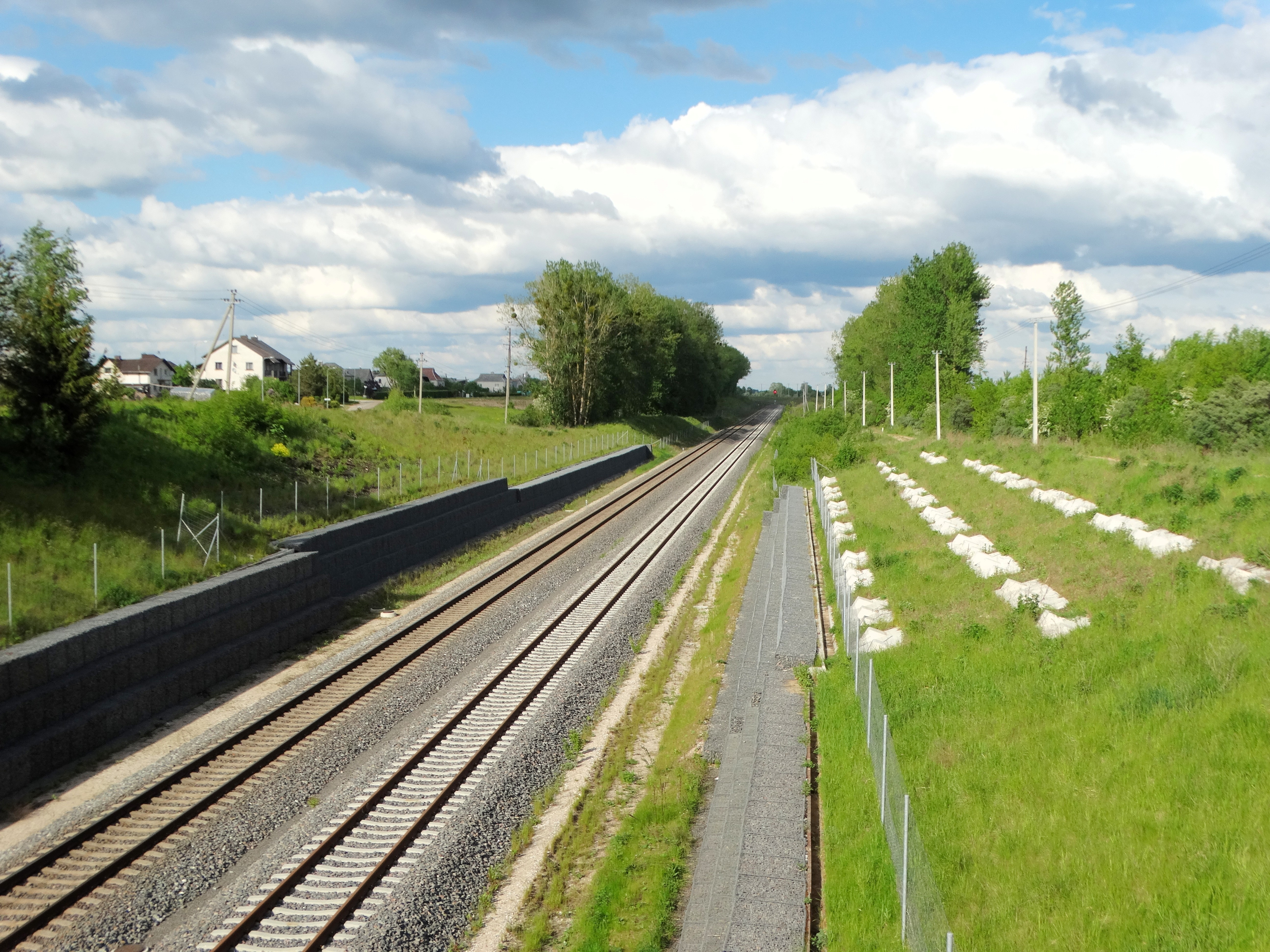
Rail Baltica track in Rokai (Kaunas district)

=== Rail links with adjacent countries ===
- — Latvia, same gauge (1520 mm)
- — Poland, dual gauge (1435 mm and 1520 mm)
- — Belarus, same gauge (1520 mm)
- — Kaliningrad Railway with Russia, same gauge (1520 mm)

== Gallery ==
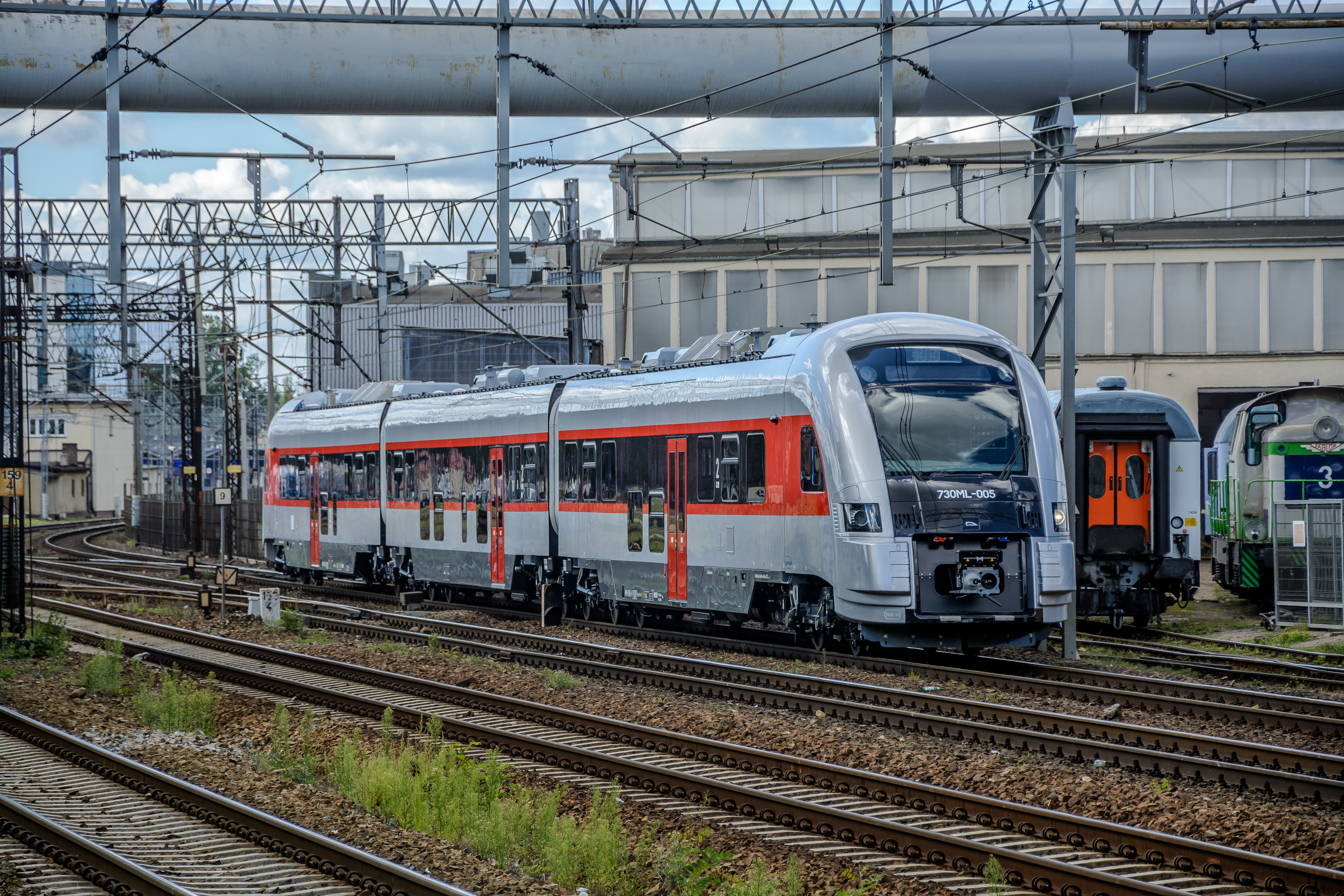
Pesa 730M train operated by LTG

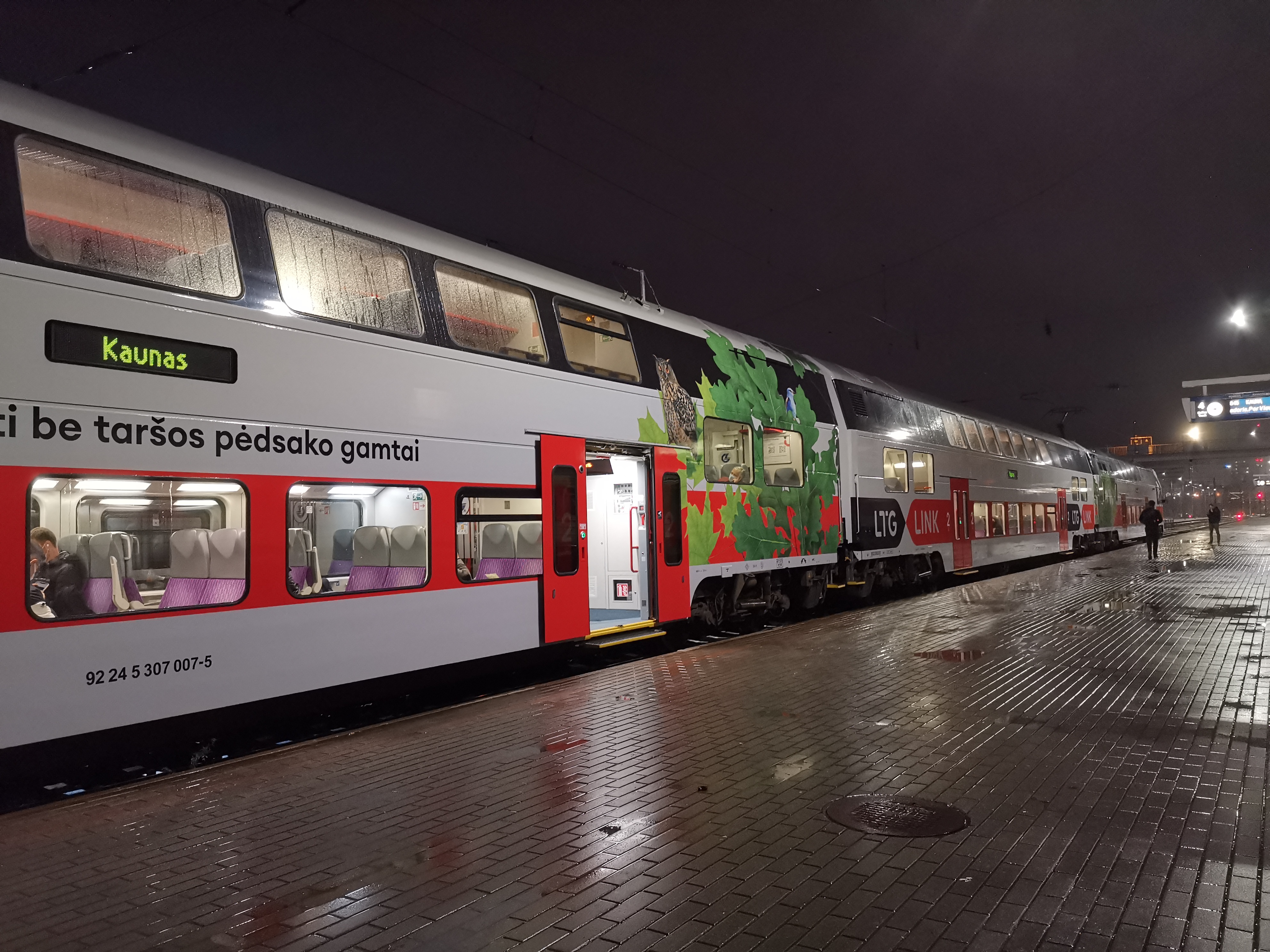
LTG Link service Vilnius–Kaunas

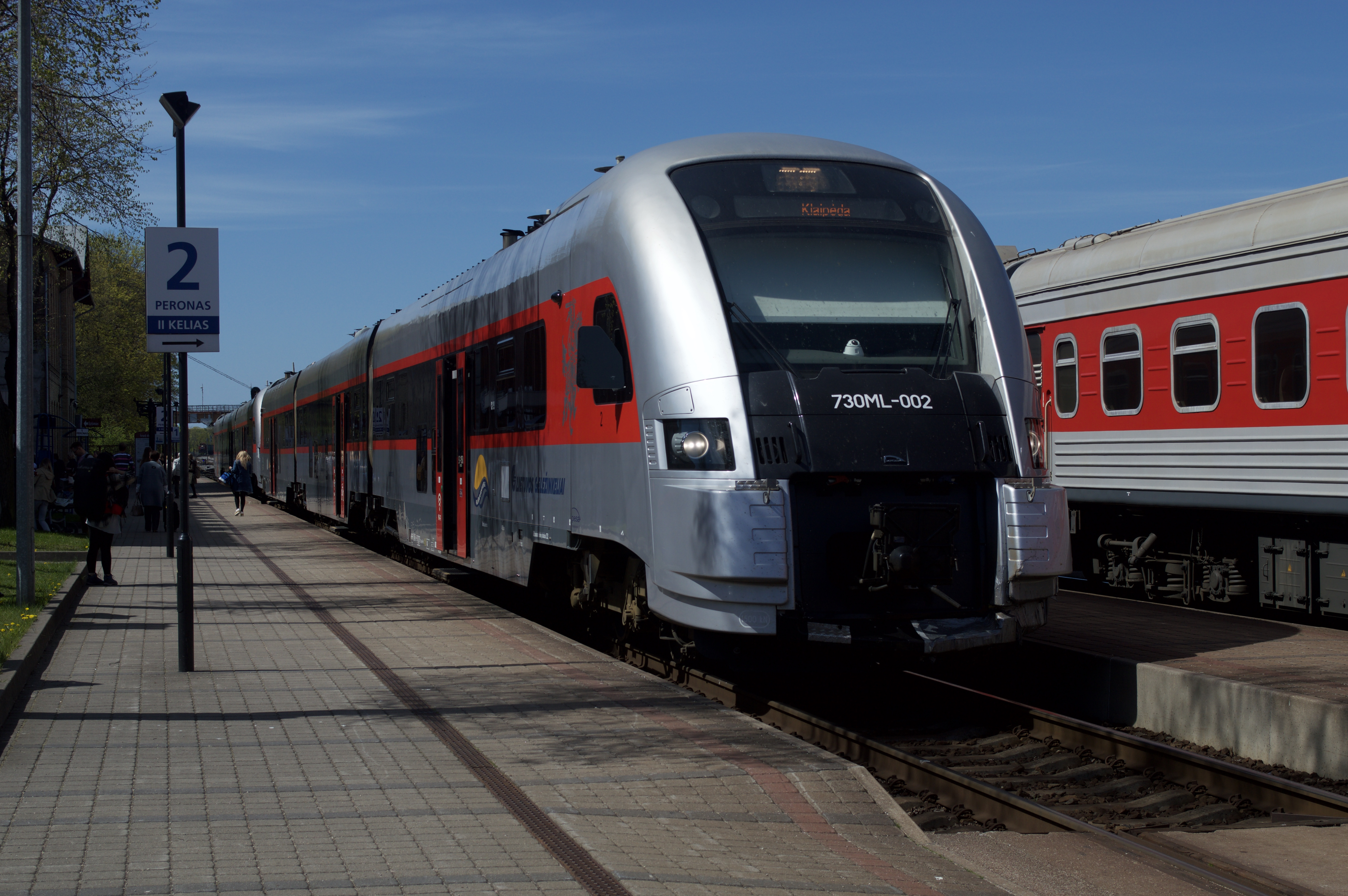
Train in Klaipėda railway station

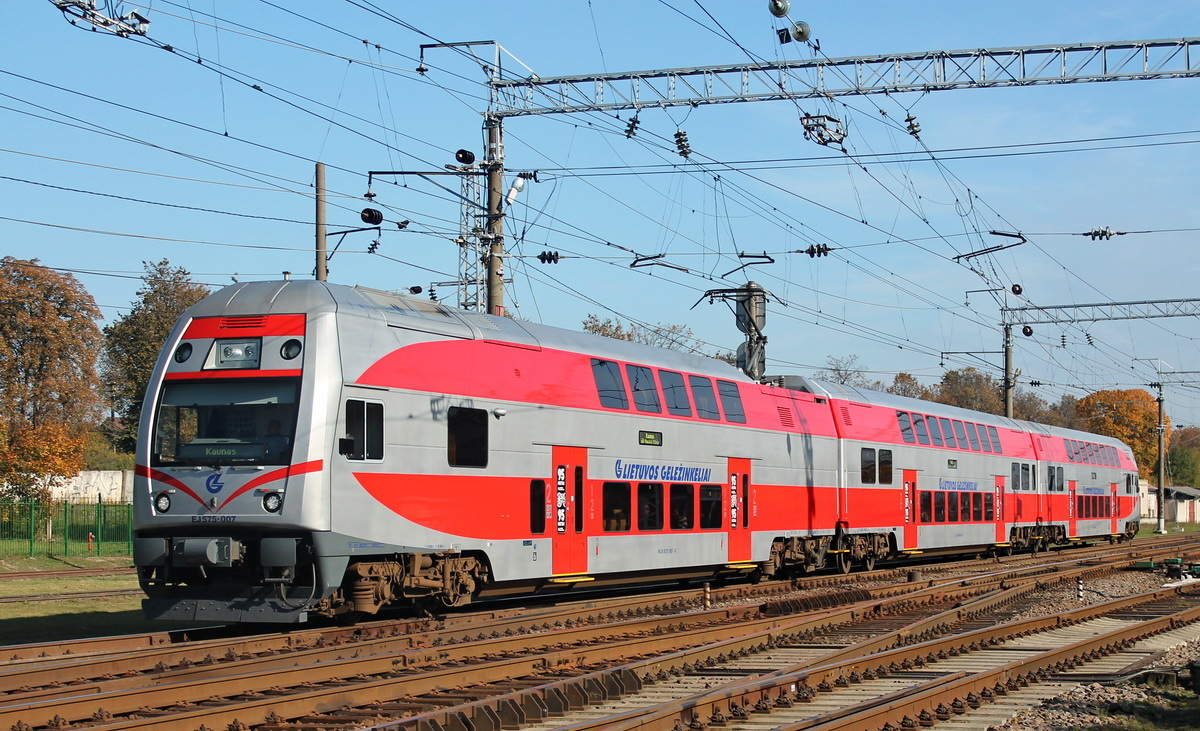
Škoda EJ575-007 train

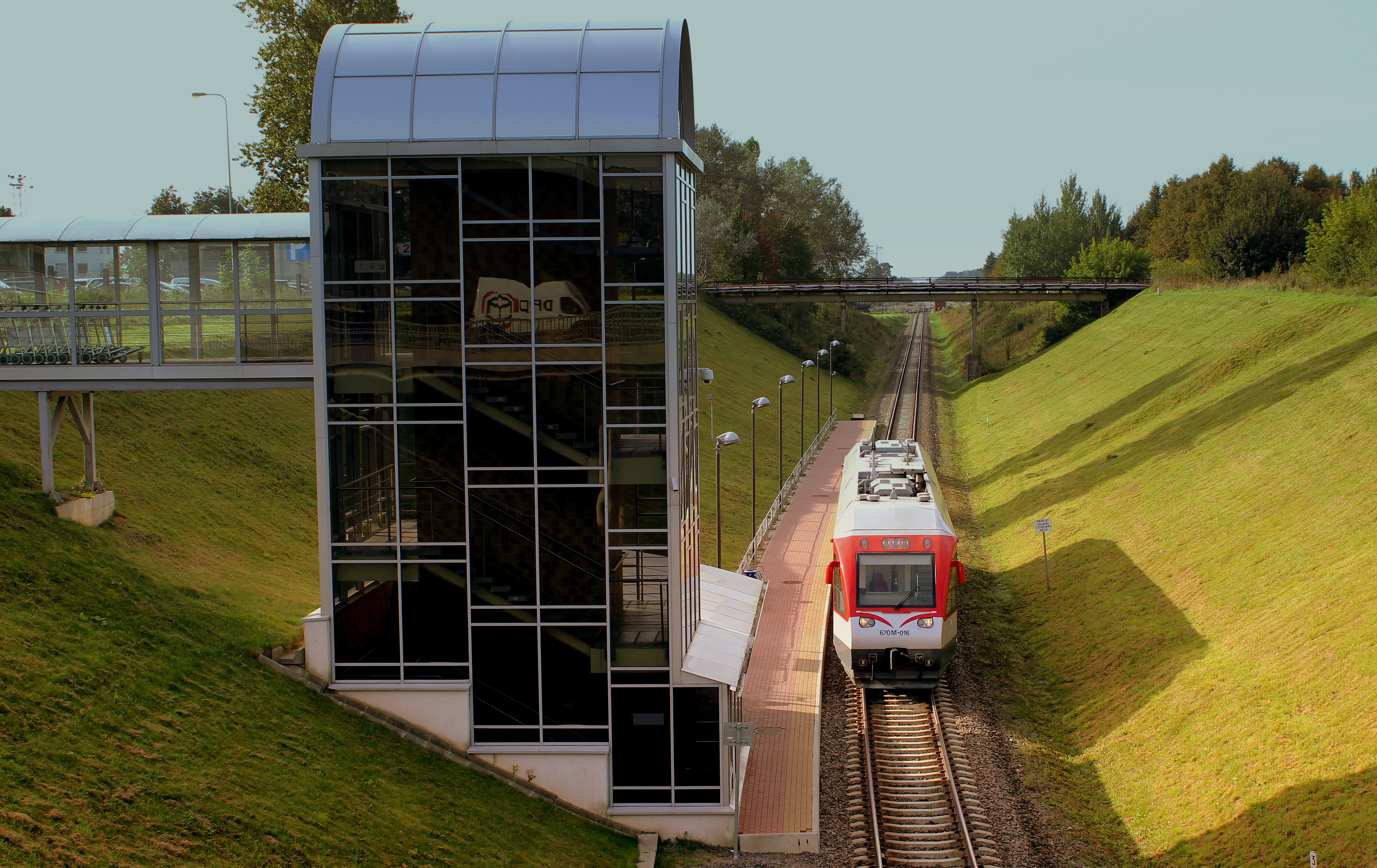
Train station at Vilnius Airport

== See also ==
- List of railway stations in Lithuania
- Transport in Lithuania
- Vilnius Metro
