= Lithuanian Railways =

State-owned railway company of Lithuania

AB Lietuvos geležinkeliai

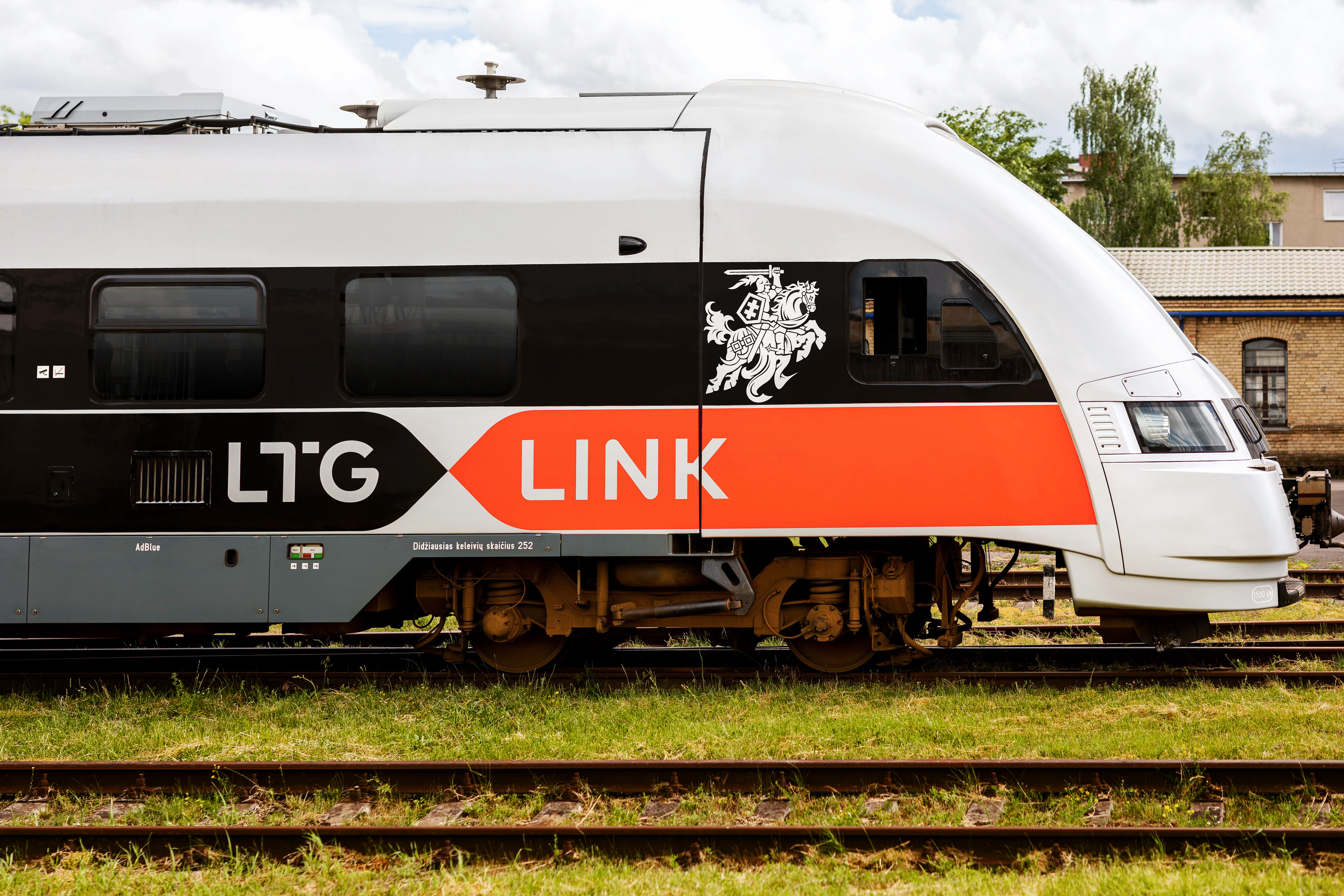
- Trade name: LTG Group
- Type: Group of public companies
- Industry: Rail transport
- Founded: 1860 (first railway); 1919 (official); 1991 (current company)
- Headquarters: Vilnius, Lithuania
- Key people: Egidijus Lazauskas (General Manager); Kęstutis Šliužas (Chairman)
- Products: Rail transport, cargo transport, services
- Revenue: ▼€434.1 million (2022)
- Operating income: ▼€5.7 million (2022)
- Net income: ▼€1.2 million (2022)
- Total assets: ▲€2.280 billion (2022)
- Total equity: ▼€1.161.5 billion (2022)
- Owner: Ministry of Transport and Communications
- Number of employees: ▼6,126 (2022)
- Subsidiaries: LTG Link; LTG Cargo; LTG Infra
- Website: ltg.lt/en

LTG Group, officially Lietuvos geležinkeliai (English: Lithuanian Railways), known as LTG, is the national state-owned railway company of Lithuania. It operates most of the railway network in the country. Its main subsidiary companies are LTG Link, for passenger services, LTG Cargo, for freight service, and LTG Infra, for maintenance and development of infrastructure.

During 2022, Lithuanian Railways transported 4.69 million passengers and 31.0 million tonnes of freight; the majority of freight conveyed comprised oil products and fertilizers.

== History and structure ==
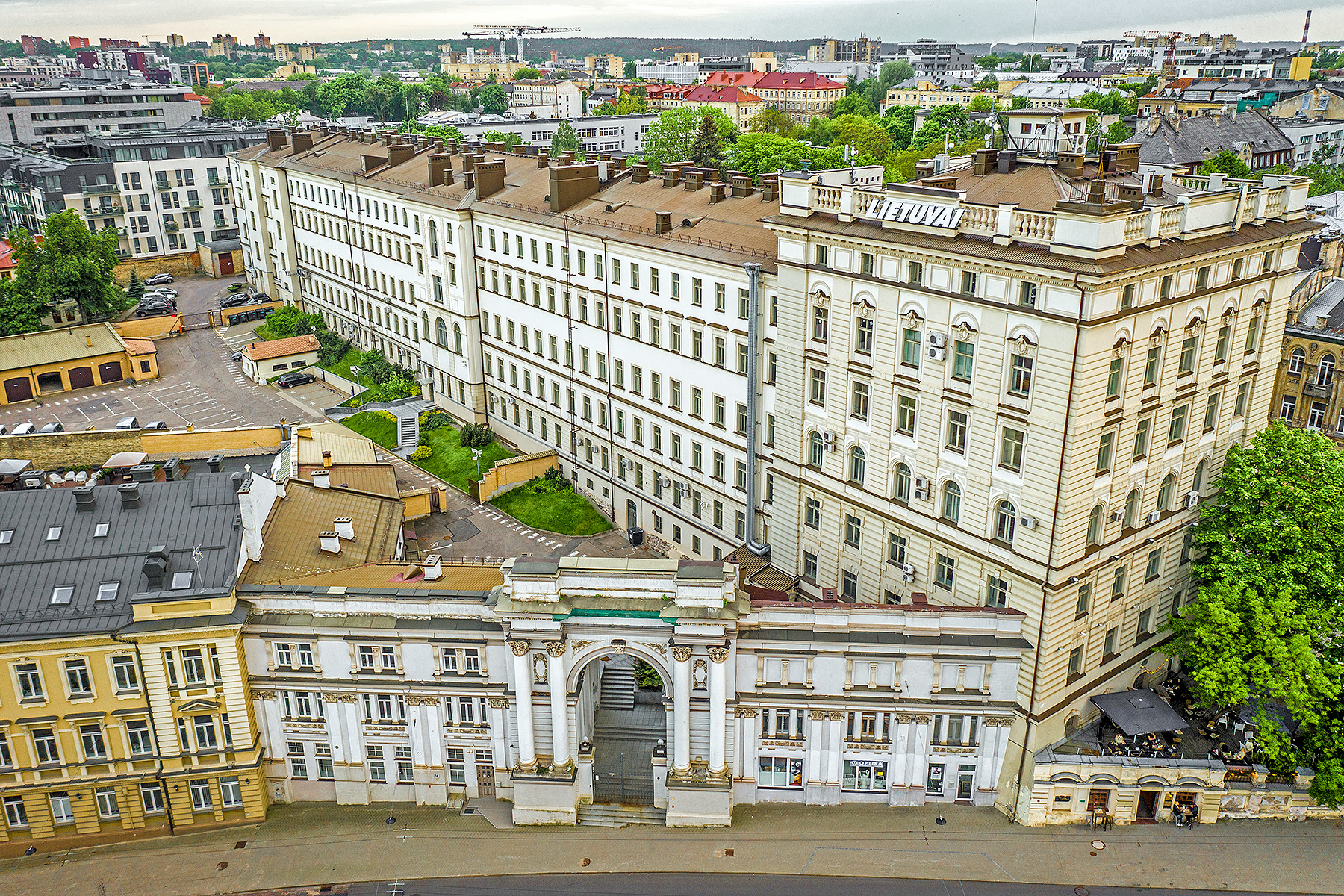
Historic headquarters in Vilnius

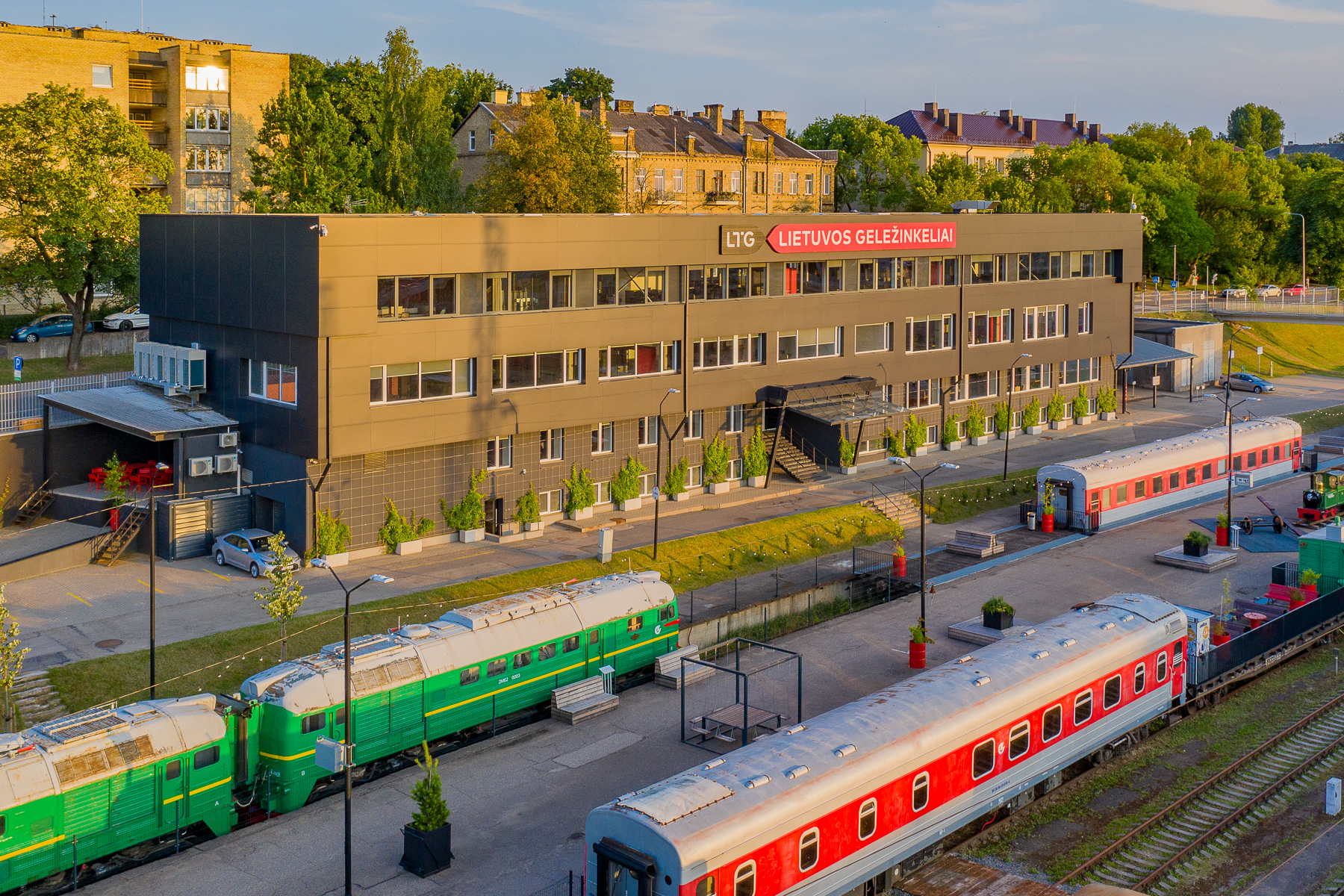
Current headquarters of LTG

Former logo

Lietuvos geležinkeliai was established in 1991 to operate the railways following the independence restoration. It provides numerous rail-related services, typically through its numerous subsidiary companies. While LTG Link is the provider for passenger services, while LTG Cargo is responsible for freight operations. Furthermore, another subsidiary, LTG Infra undertakes the maintenance and development of the railway infrastructure.

In 2008, in response to the Polish oil company PKN Orlen plans to reroute freight from its Lithuanian refinery at Mažeikiai to the Latvian port of Ventspils, the Lithuanian Railways unilaterally and intentionally dismantled the cross-border line to Latvia to prevent this. In 2017, the European Commission (EC) issued a €27.87 million fine to the Lithuanian Railways for breaching European Union (EU) competition law by the track's removal. In 2020, the cross-border line and the freight service was restored at a cost of €9.4m.

In May 2017, Lithuanian Railways was one of several companies that facilitated the launch of a new international tank container train service between Europe and China. In September of that same year, the first electrified cross-border trains started between Lithuania and Belarus. On 29 May 2018, the railway companies of the three Baltic states signed an agreement to launch a new intermodal freight service called Amber Train, linking Tallinn and Riga to the Lithuanian-Polish border at Šeštokai where they can be transhipped to the standard gauge network. EU funding was used to support some of these initiatives. During the late 2010s, there was a noticeable uptick in the volume of freight traffic traversing the Lithuanian rail network, along with corresponding increases in revenue.

Between 2018 and 2019, the company's Freight Transport, Passenger Transport and Railway Infrastructure Directorates were reorganized into separate companies, comprising LG CARGO, LG Keleiviams, and Lietuvos geležinkelių infrastruktura. The holding company LTG Group was also established, it remained a state owned enterprise; any excess profits not reinvested into the organisation is paid out to the Lithuanian government. A new group logo, mirroring the colours of the Lithuanian flag and symbolising movement, was also adopted at this time. During late 2020, the reorganisation was hailed for bolstering the competitiveness of Lithuania's railways and maintaining positive growth while also pursuing greater compliance with EU legislation.

One of the more high-profile infrastructure investments being made by LTG Infra in the wider Rail Baltica project, under which a standard gauge high-speed railway will be constructed between the Polish capital of Warsaw and the Estonian capital of Tallinn. The Lithuanian portion of the project involves a 392km line running north–south across the country as well as a new railway node being built in Kaunas to interface with the conventional network. Furthermore, during the late 2010s, a new strategy of widespread railway electrification was announced; specifically, a target for 39% of the Lithuanian rail network being electrified by 2030 was declared, a substantial increase over the 8% that already energised by 2020. Other areas of investment include track doubling, renovated communications, passenger information systems, energy efficiency schemes, routine maintenance, noise reduction, and track renewal programmes. In 2021, investment into key projects was reportedly doubled to €228.9 million, the majority of which was directed to infrastructure-related efforts.

In May 2020, a pilot freight train between Germany and Lithuania was operated under a partnership between LTG Cargo and the German intermodal specialist CargoBeamer. In September of that year, it was announced that LTG Link and the Polish operator PKP Intercity had signed a letter of intent to jointly develop a cross-border intercity passenger service between Vilnius and Warsaw. In March 2021, it was announced that the German specialist IVU Traffic Technologies would supply its digital resource planning and real-time traffic management software to the Lithuanian Railways. That same year, Lithuanian Railways issued multiple tenders calling for the provision of additional electric traction, including hybrid solutions.

In April 2022, LTG Link launched a new ticketing website, displaying more detailed information about services, customer service channels, and travel planning tools; the launch was connected to the introduction of a new smart ticket system that had been promised two years prior. In October 2022, a contract was awarded to ABB to supply 25kV AC electrification apparatus along the 730km line between Vilnius and Klaipėda.

By March 2024, via their software provider, Distribusion, the operator had completed its first integration with Google Maps, providing schedule and ticketing services via the platform.

== Rolling stock ==
At the middle of 2026, fleet of LTG Group's subsidiaries consisted of:

- Locomotives:
  - 29 EMUs
    - Stadler FLIRT
    - Škoda EJ 575
  - 13 railcars
    - Pesa 620M, Pesa 630M
  - 28 DMUs
    - Pesa 730ML
    - DR1A
  - 218 locomotives
    - Siemens ER20
    - 2M62
- Wagons:
  - 12 passenger wagons
  - 42 EMU wagons
  - 92 DMU wagons
  - 7176 freight wagons
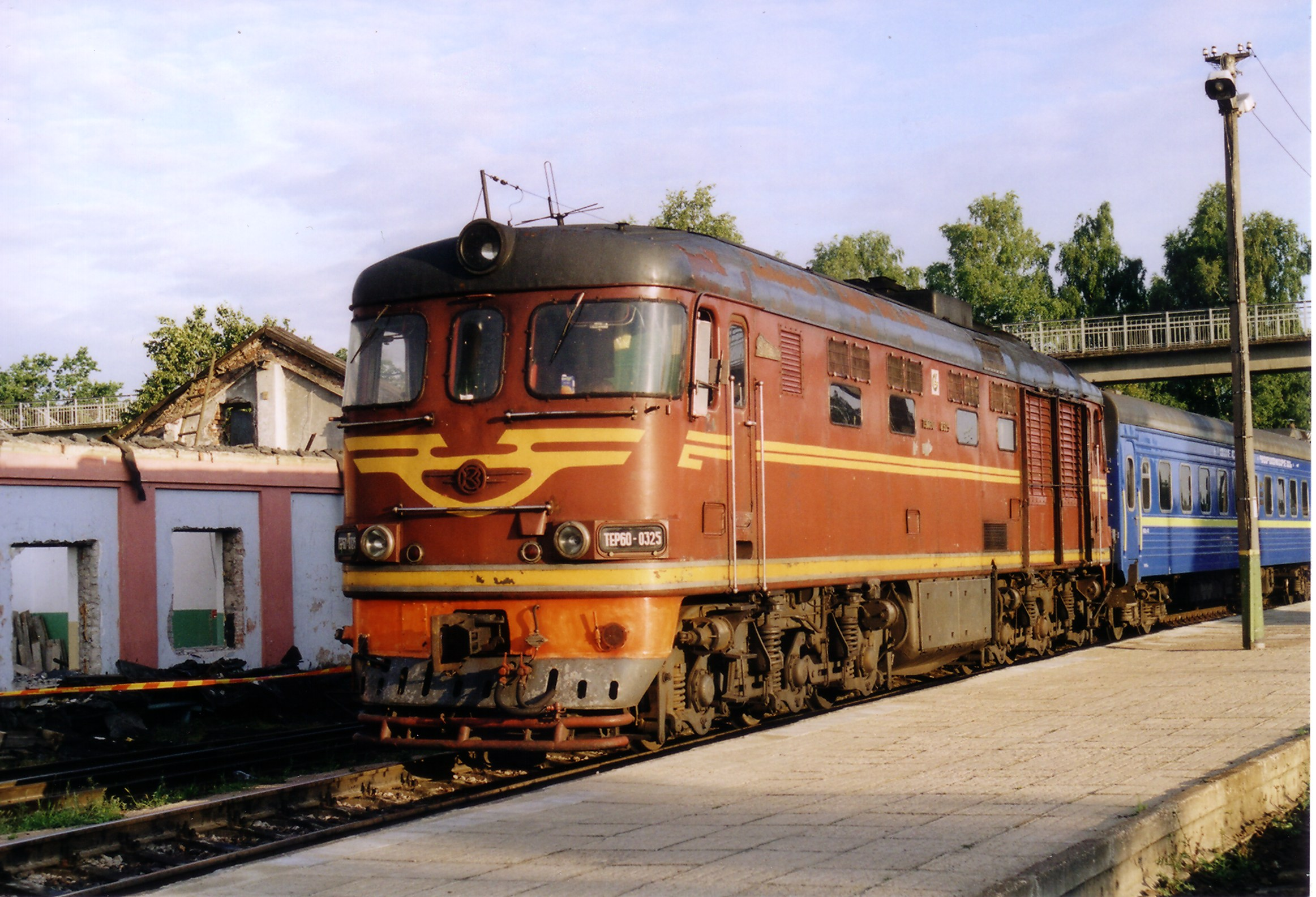
TEP60

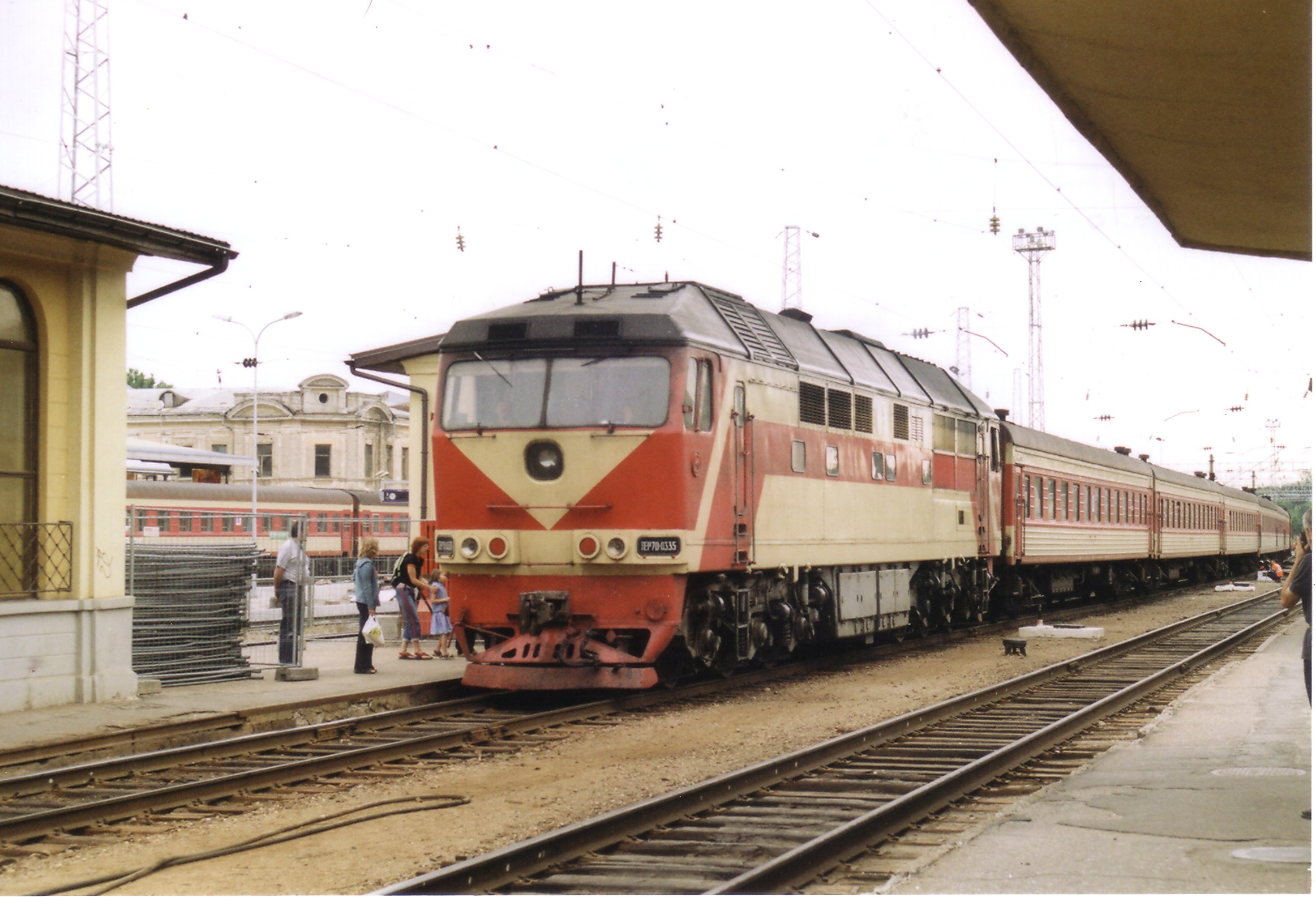
TEP70

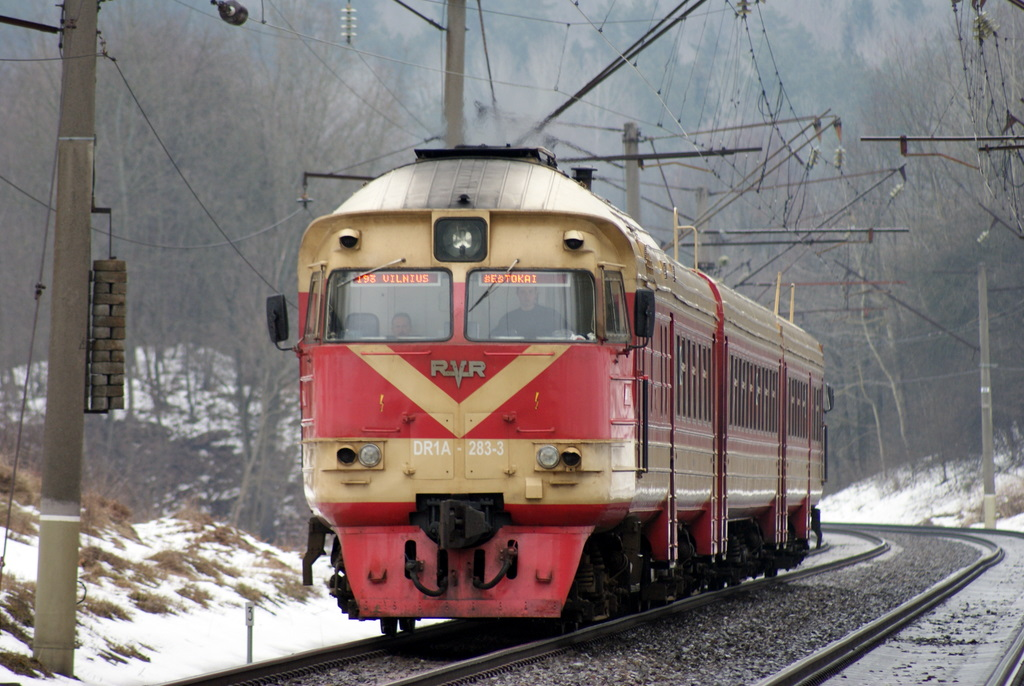
DR1

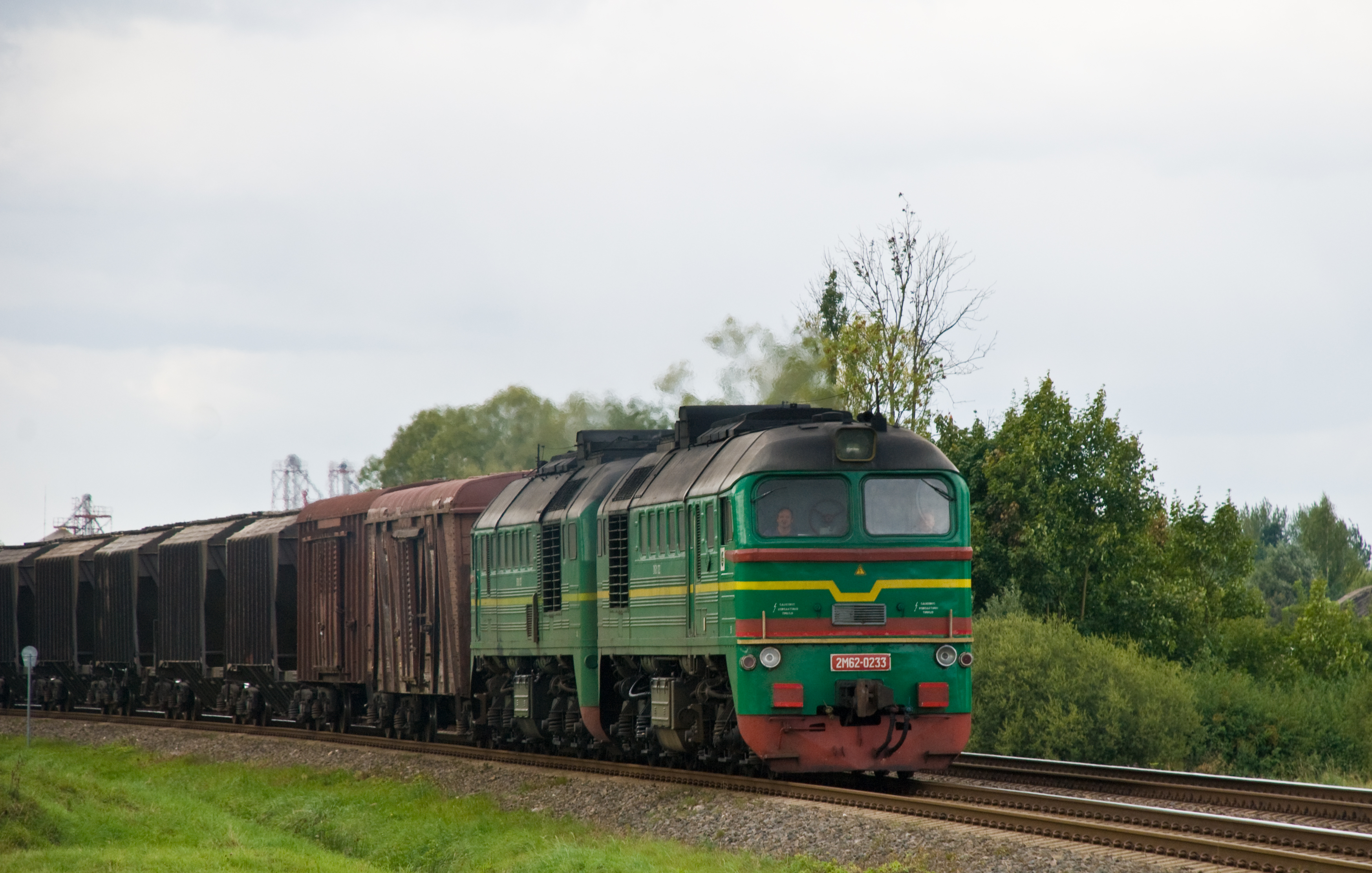
2M62

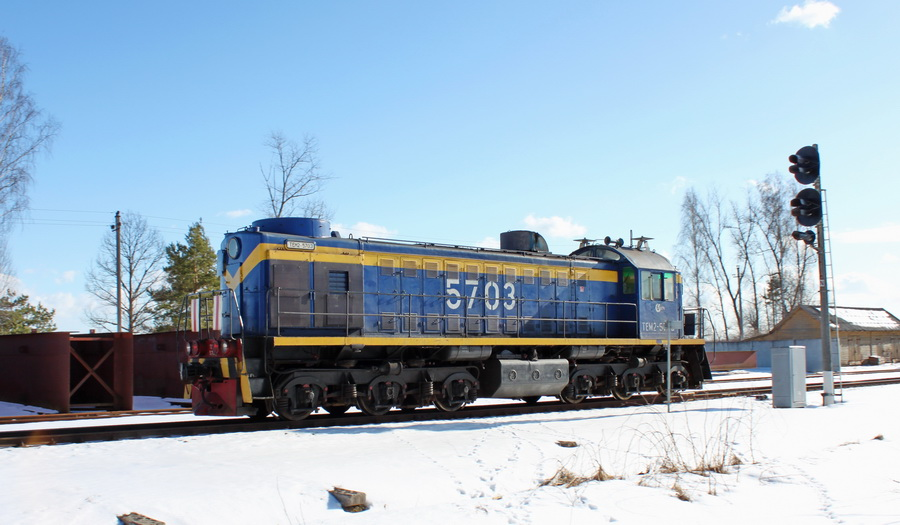
TEM2-5703

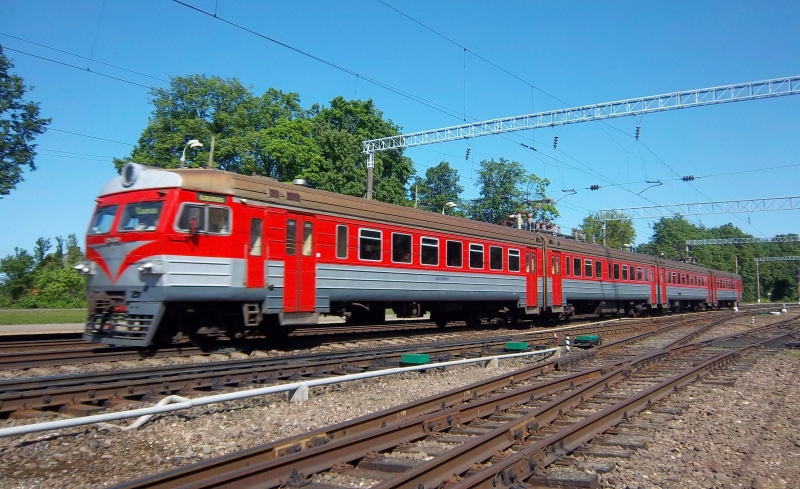
ER9

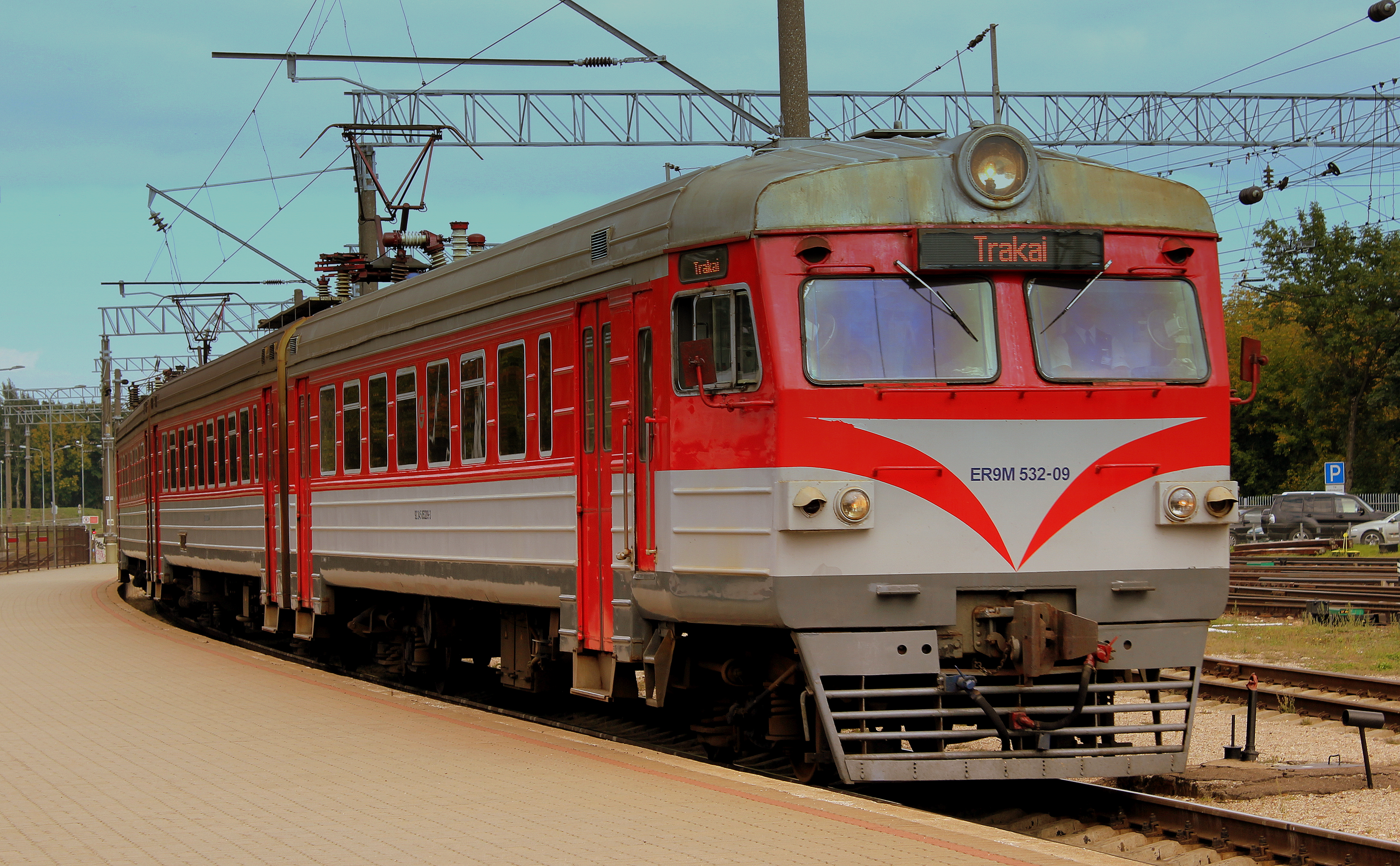
ER9M

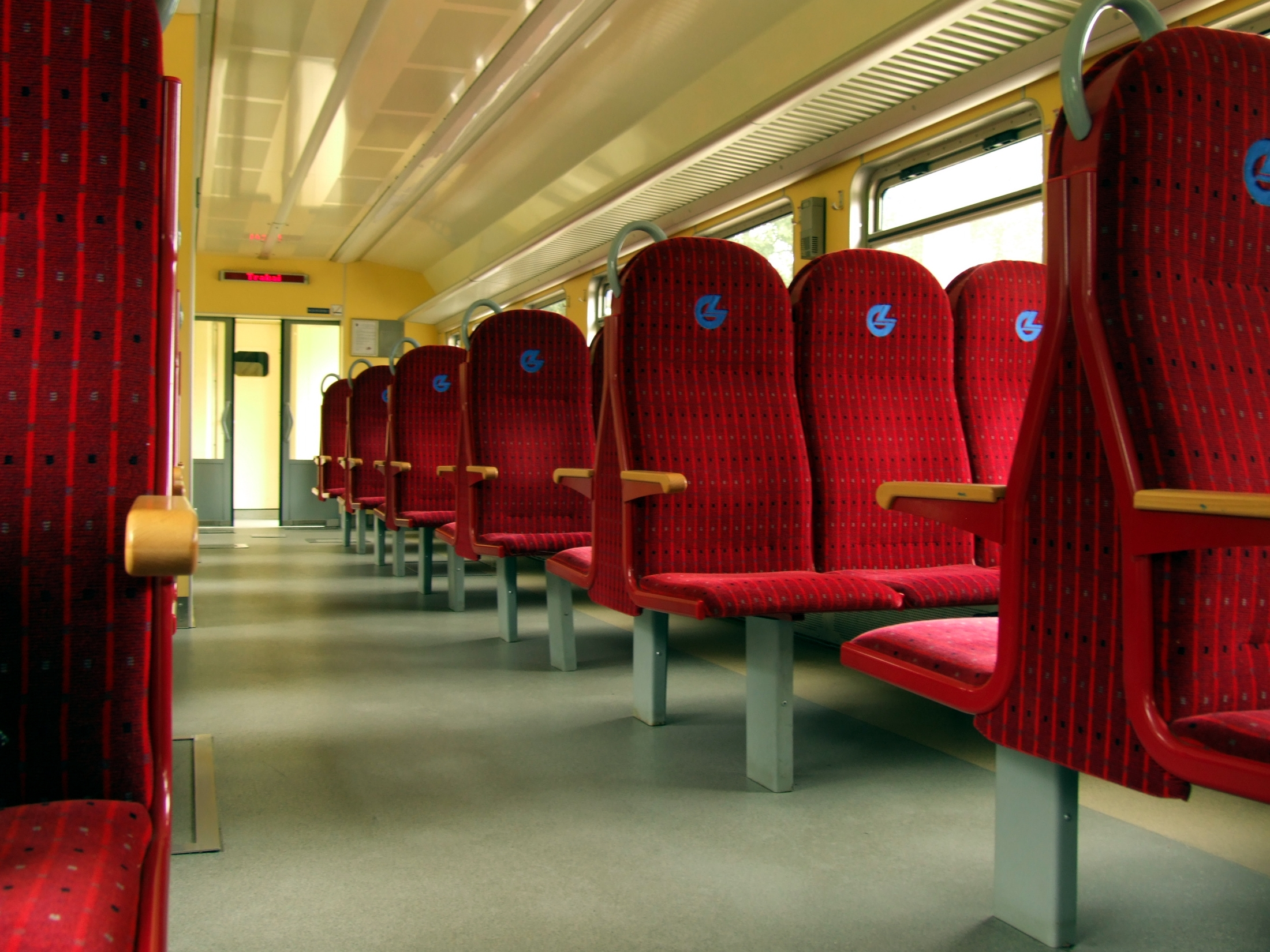
ER9M (interior)

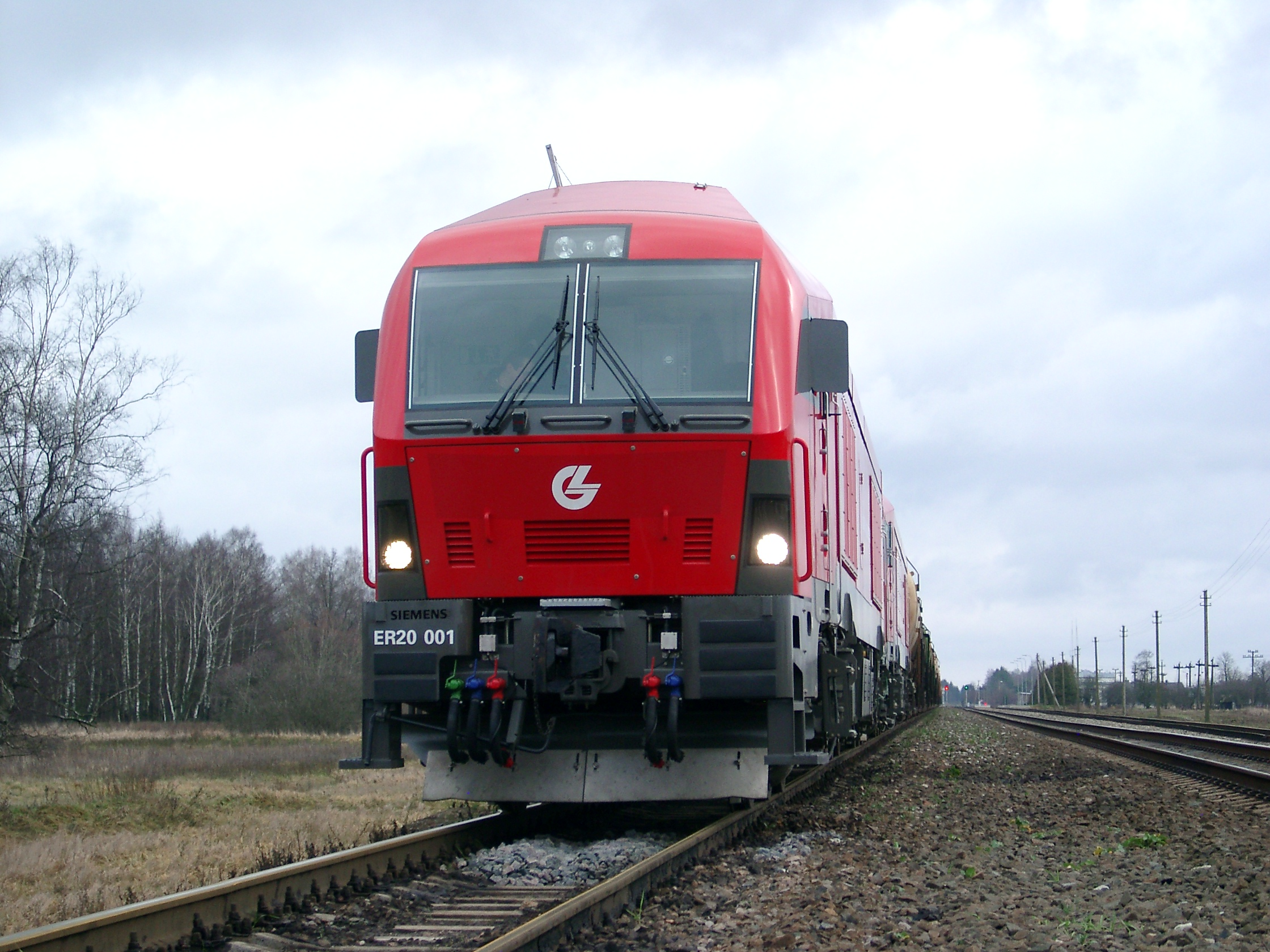
Siemens ER20

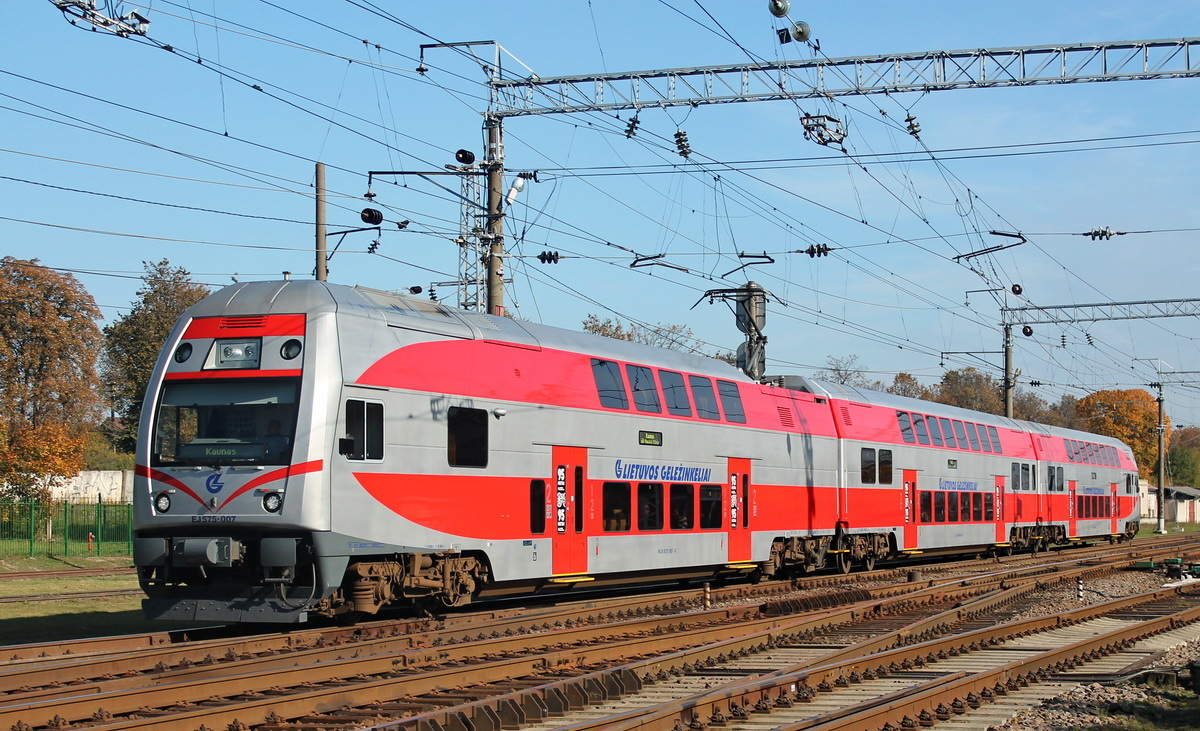
Škoda EJ 575

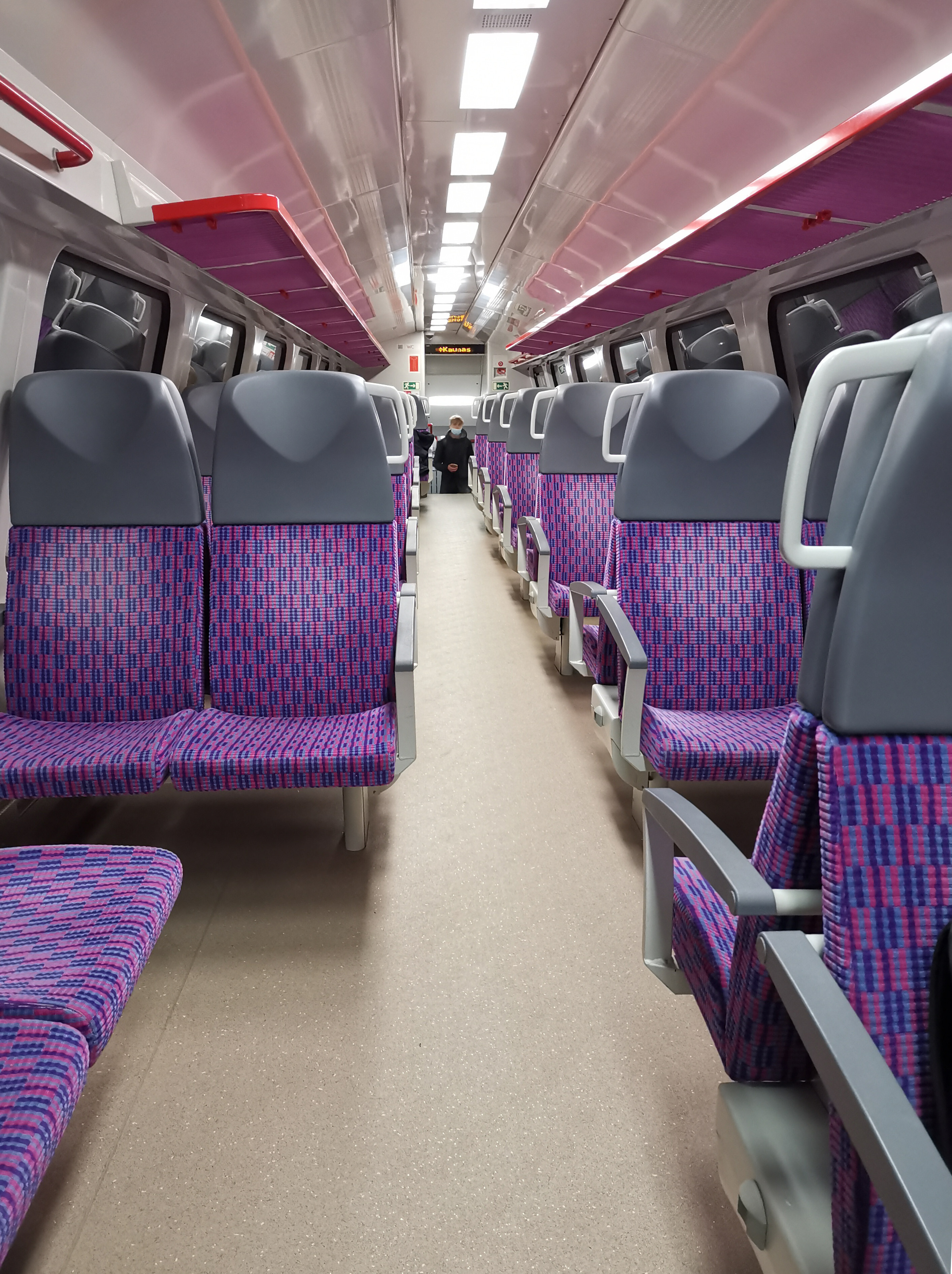
EJ 575 (interior)

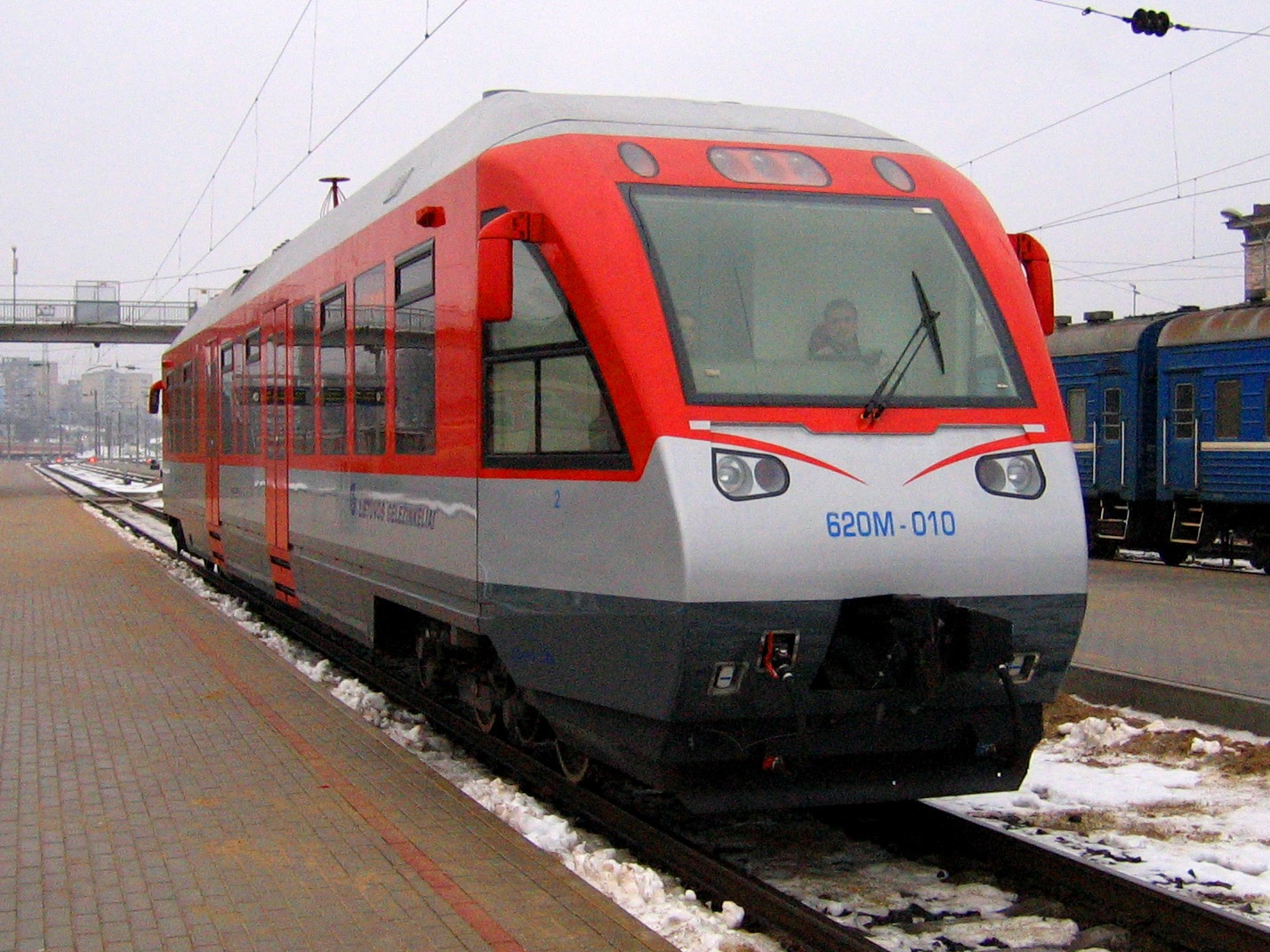
Pesa 620M

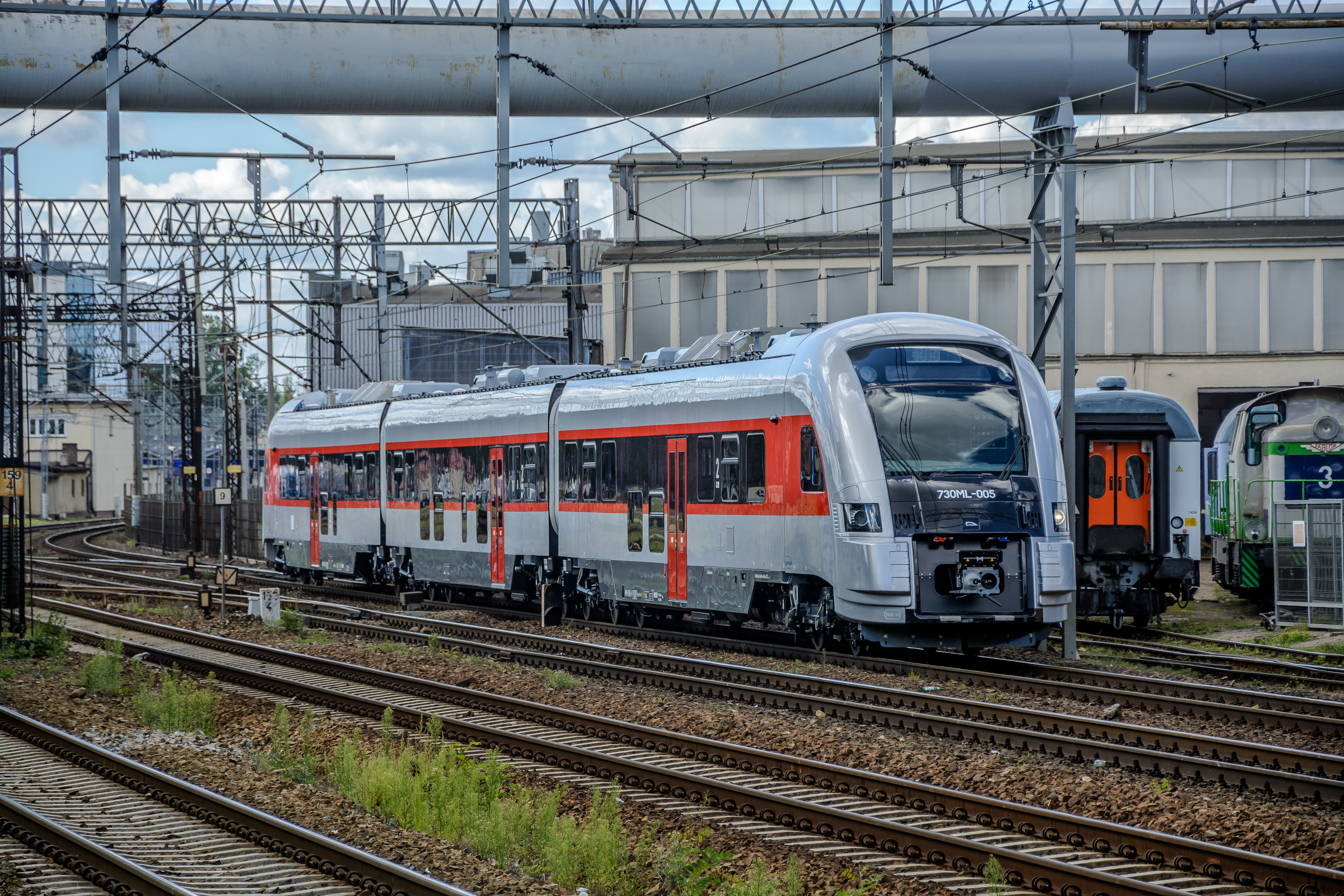
Pesa 730ML

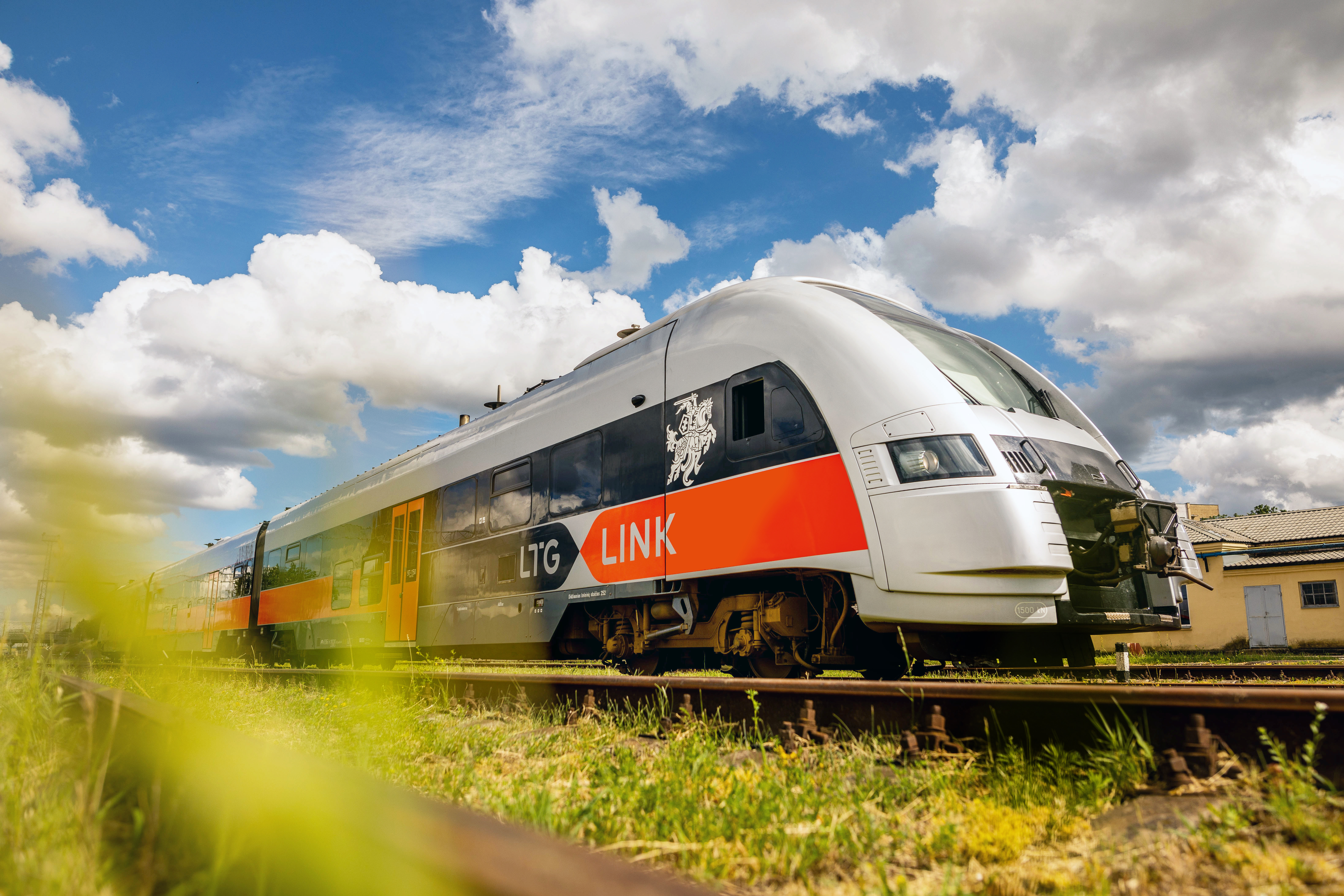
Pesa 730ML (close up)

== See also ==
- Rail transport in Lithuania
- Transport in Lithuania
- Vilnius Metro
- Vilnius Intermodal Terminal
- Kaunas Intermodal Terminal
