= Kaunas Intermodal Terminal =

Coordinates: 54.92°N 24.07°E

Kaunas Intermodal Terminal is a railway intermodal containers terminal in Kaunas, Lithuania. Terminal is located next to the Palemonas railway station.

== History ==
Location of the terminal was selected due Rail Baltica railway project in Kaunas. The total estimated cost of the project is 87.6 million Lt. Terminal officially opened on 26 May 2015.

== Capacity ==
Annual loading capacity is 55,000 TEU. It is second biggest intermodal terminal in the country after Vilnius Intermodal Terminal.
