= Vilnius Intermodal Terminal =

Railway dry port in Lithuania

Coordinates: 54°34′52″N 25°13′32″E

Vilnius Intermodal Terminal is a first railway dry port in Vilnius, Lithuania. Terminal is located next to the Vaidotai railway station. The project was carried out by Lithuanian Railways (AB “Lietuvos geležinkeliai”), making use of support from the EU Cohesion Fund. This project worked to achieve one of the most important goals of the EU and Lithuania: to reduce roadway usage and transfer a large part of the burden of cargo transportation to railways.

== History ==
The construction works started on 21 June 2013. The total estimated cost of the project is 107.2 millions Lt.

As of 2013 agreement 51% of the shares belongs to the Vilnius city municipality, while Lithuanian Railways owns the remaining 49%.

On 26 May 2015 the Vilnius Intermodal Terminal was officially opened with Prime Minister Algirdas Butkevičius participating in opening ceremony.

== Capacity ==
The total area of the terminal is 54 ha. Annual capacity is around 100,000 TEU.
