= St. Casimir Church =

St. Casimir Church may refer to several Roman Catholic churches:

== Lithuania ==
- Church of St. Casimir, Naujoji Vilnia
- Church of St. Casimir, Vilnius

== Poland ==
- Church of St. Casimir the Prince, Kraków
- St. Kazimierz Church, Warsaw
- St. Casimir the Prince Church, Września

== United Kingdom ==
- St Casimir's Lithuanian Church, Bethnal Green, London

== United States ==
- St. Casimir Lithuanian Church, Los Angeles, California
- St. Casimir Lithuanian Roman Catholic Church, Sioux City, Iowa
- St. Casimir Church, Baltimore, Maryland
- Church of St. Casimir (Saint Paul, Minnesota)
- St. Casimir's Roman Catholic Church (Newark, New Jersey)
- St. Casimir's Roman Catholic Church, now the Paul Robeson Theater, a New York City Designated Landmark in Brooklyn, New York
- St. Casimir Church (Cleveland, Ohio)

== See also ==
- St. Casimir Parish (disambiguation)
