= Ignalina railway station =

Railway station in Lithuania

Ignalina
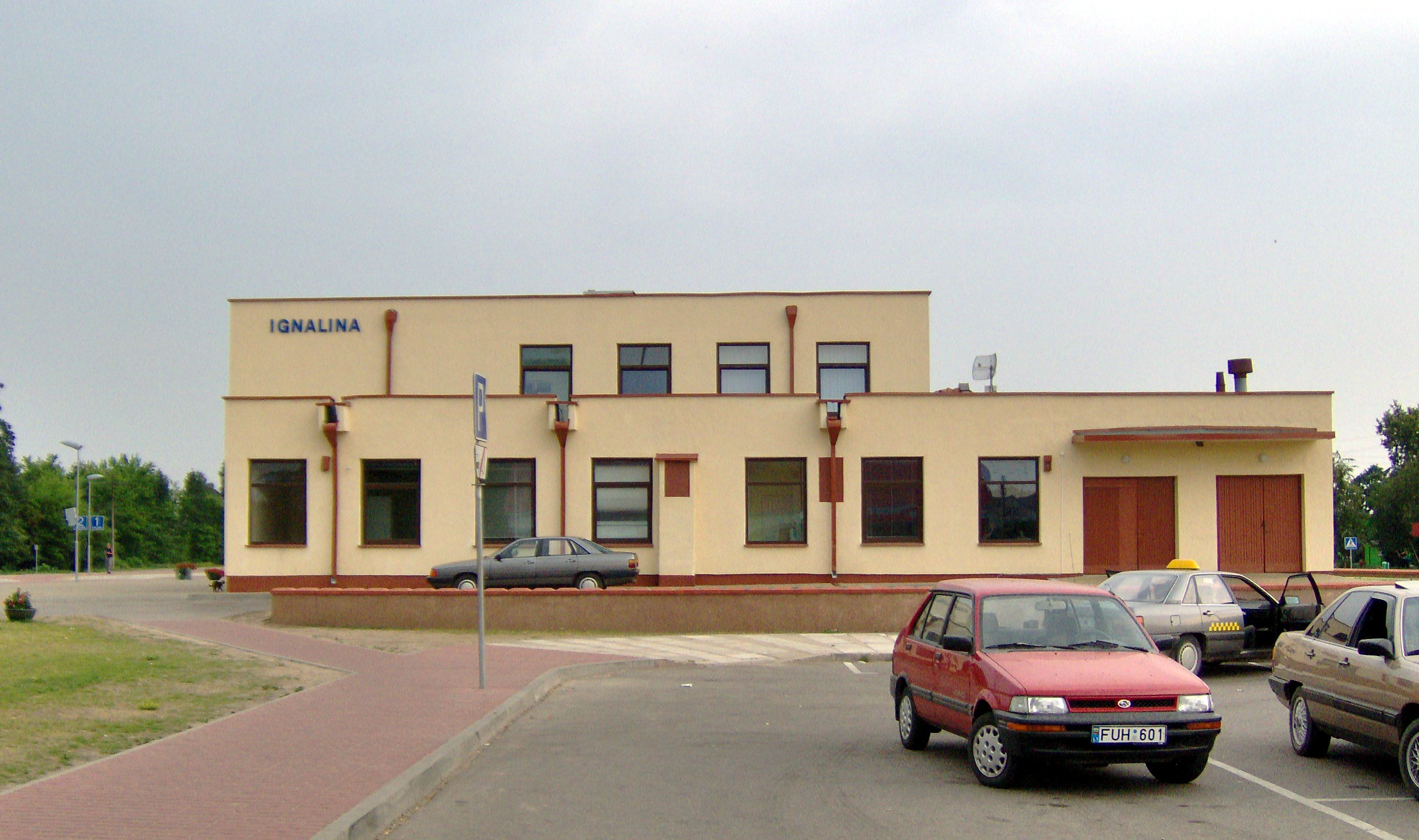
- Ignalina station in 2006

General information
- Location: Geležinkelio g. 19; Ignalina; Lithuania
- Coordinates: 55°20′19″N 26°9′49″E
- Line: Vilnius–Turmantas Railway
- Train operators: Lietuvos Geležinkeliai (LTG)

Services
Preceding station	LTG Link	Following station
Pakretuonė towards Vilnius	Vilnius—Turmantas	Lobiniai towards Turmantas
Location
- Location within Lithuania

Ignalina railway station (Lithuanian: Ignalinos geležinkelio stotis) is a railway station serving the city of Ignalina in eastern Lithuania. The station is located in the centre of the city next to the city's bus station.

The station opened in 1860 as a part of the historic railway line between Saint Petersburg and Warsaw.

Map of the Lithuanian railway network

== See also ==
- List of railway stations in Lithuania
- Rail transport in Lithuania
- History of rail transport in Lithuania
- Transport in Lithuania
