= Naujoji Vilnia railway station =

Railway station in Vilnius, Lithuania

Coordinates: 54°41′37″N 25°24′31″E

Naujoji Vilnia
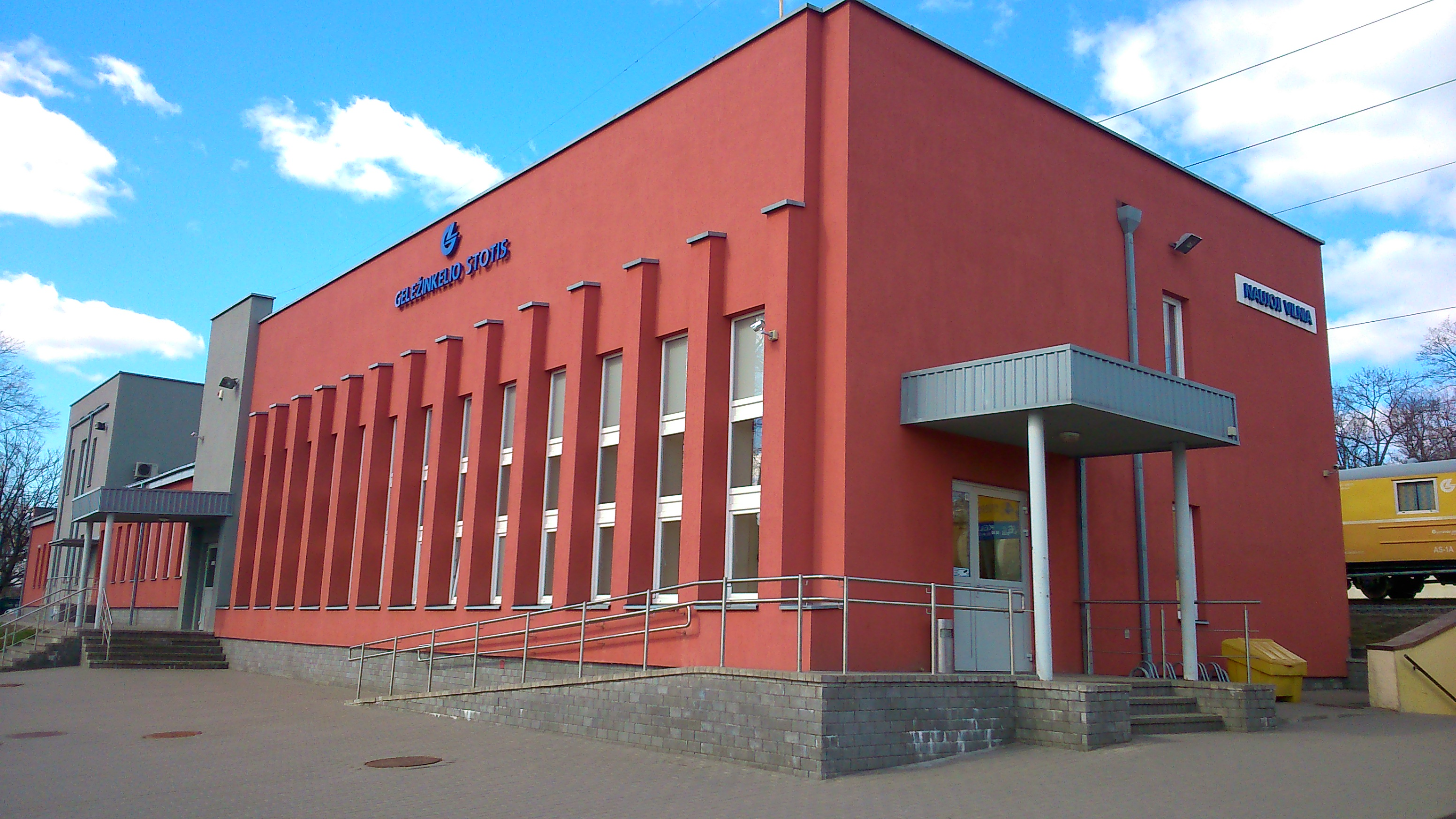
- Station building in 2014

General information
- Location: Kojelavičiaus g. 14; Vilnius, 11118 Vilnius City Municipality; Lithuania
- Managed by: Lithuanian Railways
- Platforms: 3

History
- Opened: 1873; 153 years ago

Services
Preceding station	LTG Link	Following station
Pavilnys towards Vilnius	Vilnius—Kena	Elektrinių Traukinių Depas-1 towards Kena
Pavilnys towards Vilnius	Vilnius—Turmantas	Elektrinių Traukinių Depas-2 towards Turmantas
Location

Naujoji Vilnia railway station (Lithuanian: Naujosios Vilnios geležinkelio stotis) is a Lithuanian Railways station serving the eldership of Naujoji Vilnia in eastern Vilnius, Lithuania. The station was built in 1873.

It is used mainly by industry, but it also organizes commercial passengers trips to Kaunas, Trakai, Ignalina, Kena and Turmantas.

== History ==
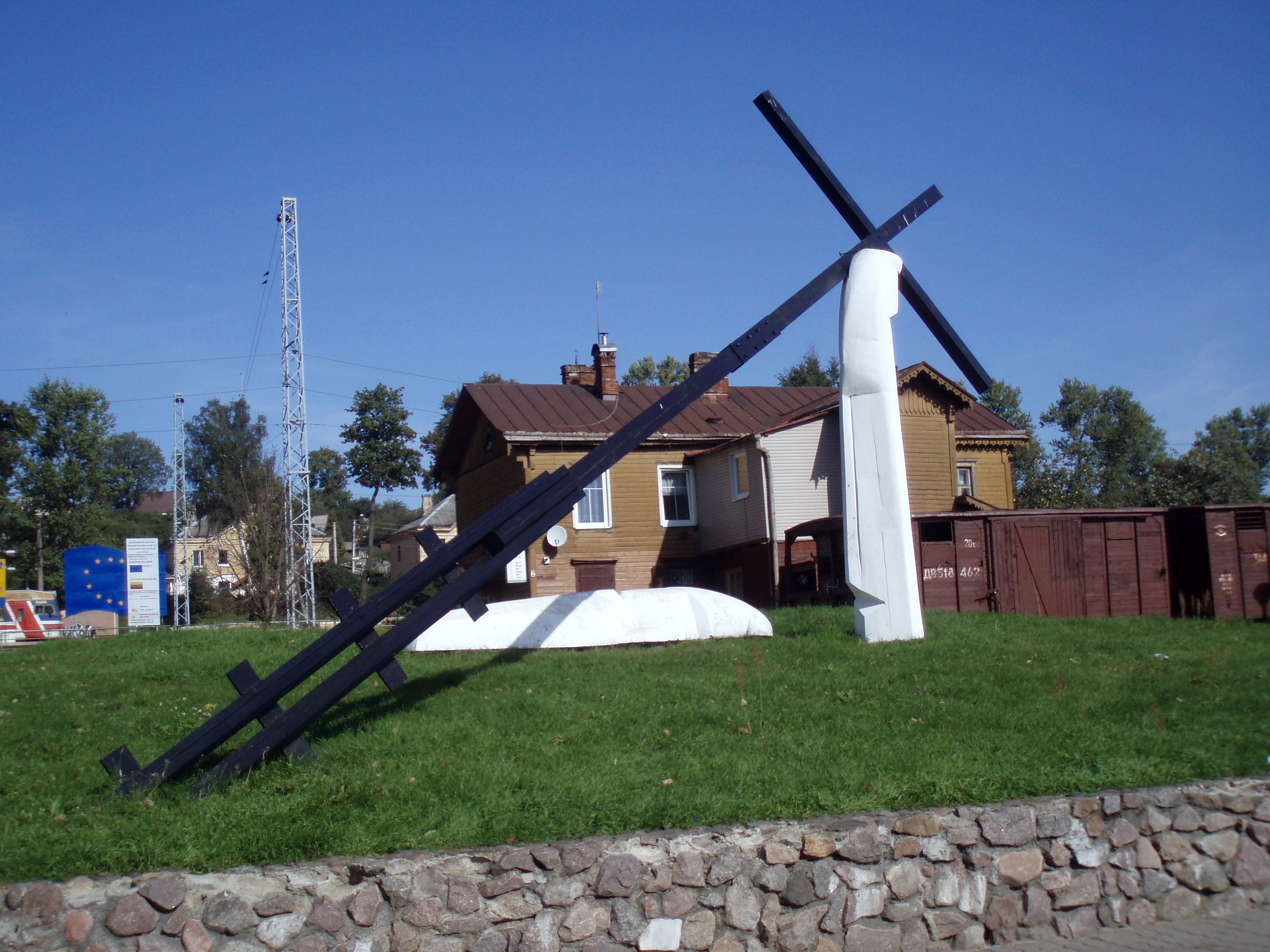
Memorial of deportations to Siberia near railway station

The station was built during the Saint Petersburg–Warsaw railway expansion. In 1940–1941 the Soviet government carried out mass deportation to Siberia from Naujoji Vilnia railway station.

Map of the Lithuanian railway network

== See also ==
- List of railway stations in Lithuania
- Rail transport in Lithuania
- Transport in Lithuania
