= Church of St. Casimir the Prince =

Church of St. Casimir the Prince may refer to:

- Church of St. Casimir the Prince, Kraków
- St. Casimir the Prince Church, Września
