= Visaginas railway station =

Railway station in Lithuania

Visaginas
- Visaginas station in 2006

General information
- Location: Pasmalvės k. Lithuania
- Coordinates: 55°36′50″N 26°24′58″E
- Line: Vilnius–Turmantas Railway
- Train operators: Lietuvos Geležinkeliai (LTG)

Services
Preceding station	LTG Link	Following station
Gerkonys towards Vilnius	Vilnius—Turmantas	Turmantas Terminus
Location
- Location within Lithuania

Visaginas railway station (Lithuanian: Visagino geležinkelio stotelė) is a railway station serving the city of Visaginas in eastern Lithuania. The station is located to the northwest of the centre of the city in the village of Pasmalvės.

The station opened in 1876 as Juodbrasta station (Polish: Czarny Bród) on the historic railway line between Saint Petersburg and Warsaw which had opened in 1860.

Map of the Lithuanian railway network

== Gallery ==
The Czarny Bród railway station during World War I

== See also ==
- List of railway stations in Lithuania
- Rail transport in Lithuania
- History of rail transport in Lithuania
- Transport in Lithuania
