= List of railway stations in Lithuania =

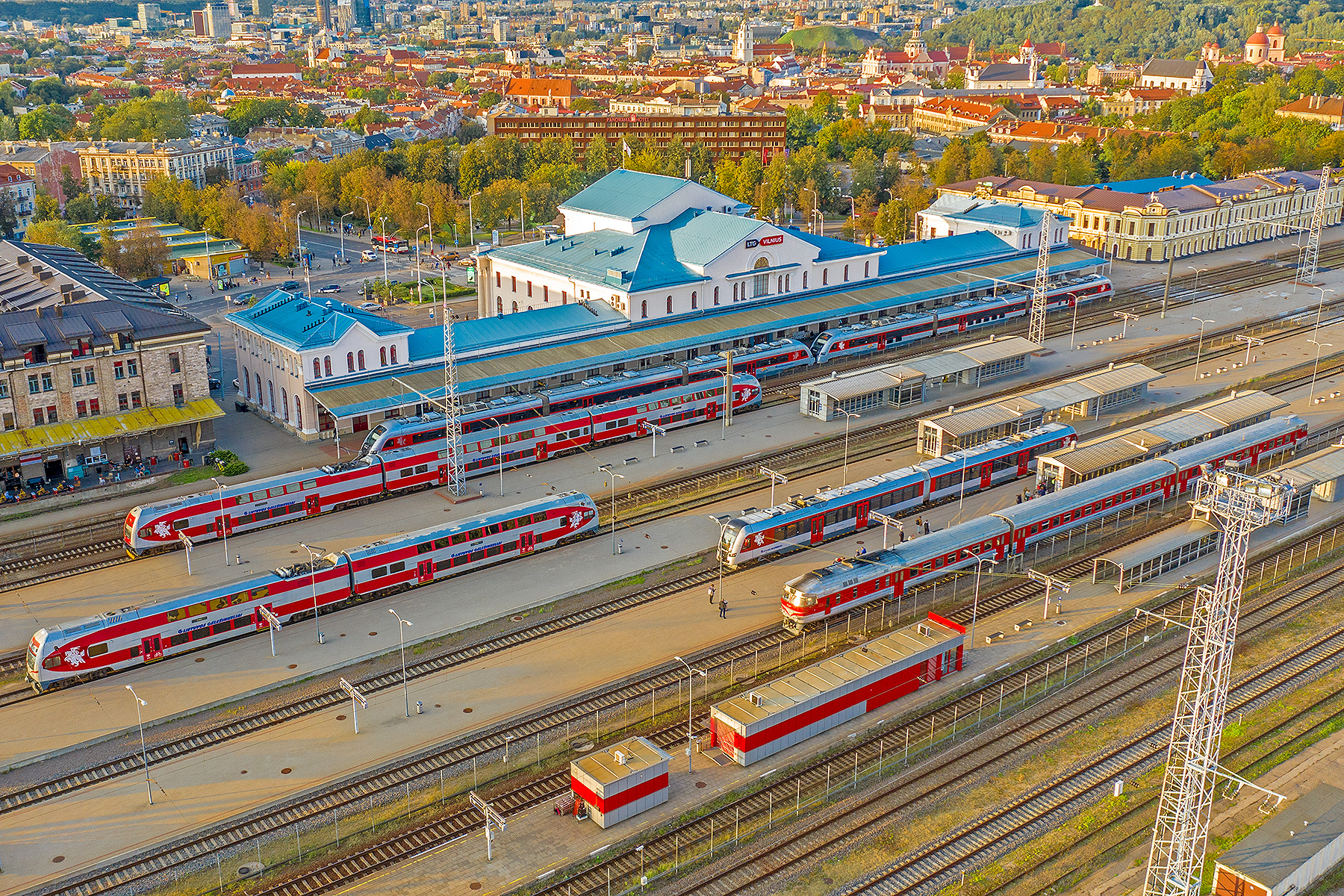
Aerial view of the Vilnius Railway Station

This is a list of all 125 railway stations in Lithuania, sorted alphabetically. All are served by LTG Link, with the exception of Šeštokai, which is served only by the Rail Baltica link to Poland.

- Akmenė railway station
- Alksnėnai railway station
- Alvitas railway station
- Bagotoji railway station
- Baltamiškis railway station
- Bebruliškė railway station
- Bezdonys railway station
- Būdviečiai railway station
- Bygailiai railway station
- Dituva railway station
- Dūkštas railway station
- Durpynas railway station
- Dūseikiai railway station
- Elektrinių Traukinių Depas-1 railway station
- Elektrinių Traukinių Depas-2 railway station
- Garliava railway station
- Gerkonys railway station
- Giruliai railway station
- Gružeikiai railway station
- Gustonys railway station
- Ignalina railway station
- Jašiūnai railway station
- Jonava railway station
- Joniškis railway station
- Juodšiliai railway station
- Jūrė railway station
- Kaišiadorys railway station
- Kalviai railway station
- Karčiupis railway station
- Kariotiškės railway station
- Karsakiškis railway station
- Kaugonys railway station
- Kaunas railway station
- Kazlų Rūda railway station
- Kėdainiai railway station
- Kena railway station
- Kirtimai railway station
- Klaipėda railway station
- Klepočiai railway station
- Kretinga railway station
- Kukorai railway station
- Kūlupėnai railway station
- Kupiškis railway station
- Kuršėnai railway station
- Kutiškiai railway station
- Kužiai railway station
- Kybartai railway station
- Kyviškės railway station
- Laba railway station
- Labučiai railway station
- Lazdėnai railway station
- Lentvaris railway station
- Lieplaukė railway station
- Lobiniai railway station
- Mankiškiai railway station
- Marcinkonys railway station
- Marijampolė railway station
- Matuizos railway station
- Mauručiai railway station
- Mažeikiai railway station
- Mickūnai railway station
- Miškiniai railway station
- Naujoji Vilnia railway station
- Oro Uostas railway station
- Pabališkiai railway station
- Pabradė railway station
- Pailgis railway station
- Pakenė railway station
- Pakretuonė railway station
- Palemonas railway station
- Pamerkiai railway station
- Pamieris railway station
- Panemunėlis railway station
- Paneriai railway station
- Panevėžys railway station
- Papilė railway station
- Parudaminys railway station
- Pavenčiai railway station
- Pavilnys railway station
- Pažeimenė railway station
- Pilviškiai railway station
- Plungė railway station
- Pravieniškės railway station
- Priekulė railway station
- Radviliškis railway station
- Radžiūnai railway station
- Raudėnai railway station
- Rimkai railway station
- Rokiškis railway station
- Rūdiškės railway station
- Rykantai railway station
- Santaka railway station
- Šateikiai railway station
- Šeduva railway station
- Senieji Trakai railway station
- Šeštokai railway station
- Šiauliai railway station
- Šilėnai railway station
- Šilutė railway station
- Skapiškis railway station
- Skersabaliai railway station
- Šklėriai railway station
- Sodai railway station
- Subačius railway station
- Švenčionėliai railway station
- Tarvainiai railway station
- Telšiai railway station
- Terešiškės railway station
- Tindžiuliai railway station
- Trakai railway station
- Tryškiai railway station
- Turmantas railway station
- Valčiūnai railway station
- Valkininkai railway station
- Varėna railway station
- Viekšniai railway station
- Vievis railway station
- Vilkaviškis railway station
- Vilkyčiai railway station
- Vilnius railway station
- Vilnius Airport Railway Station
- Vinčai railway station
- Visaginas railway station
- Vokė railway station
- Voveriškiai railway station
- Žasliai railway station
- Žeimena railway station
