= Naujoji Vilnia =

- Eldership
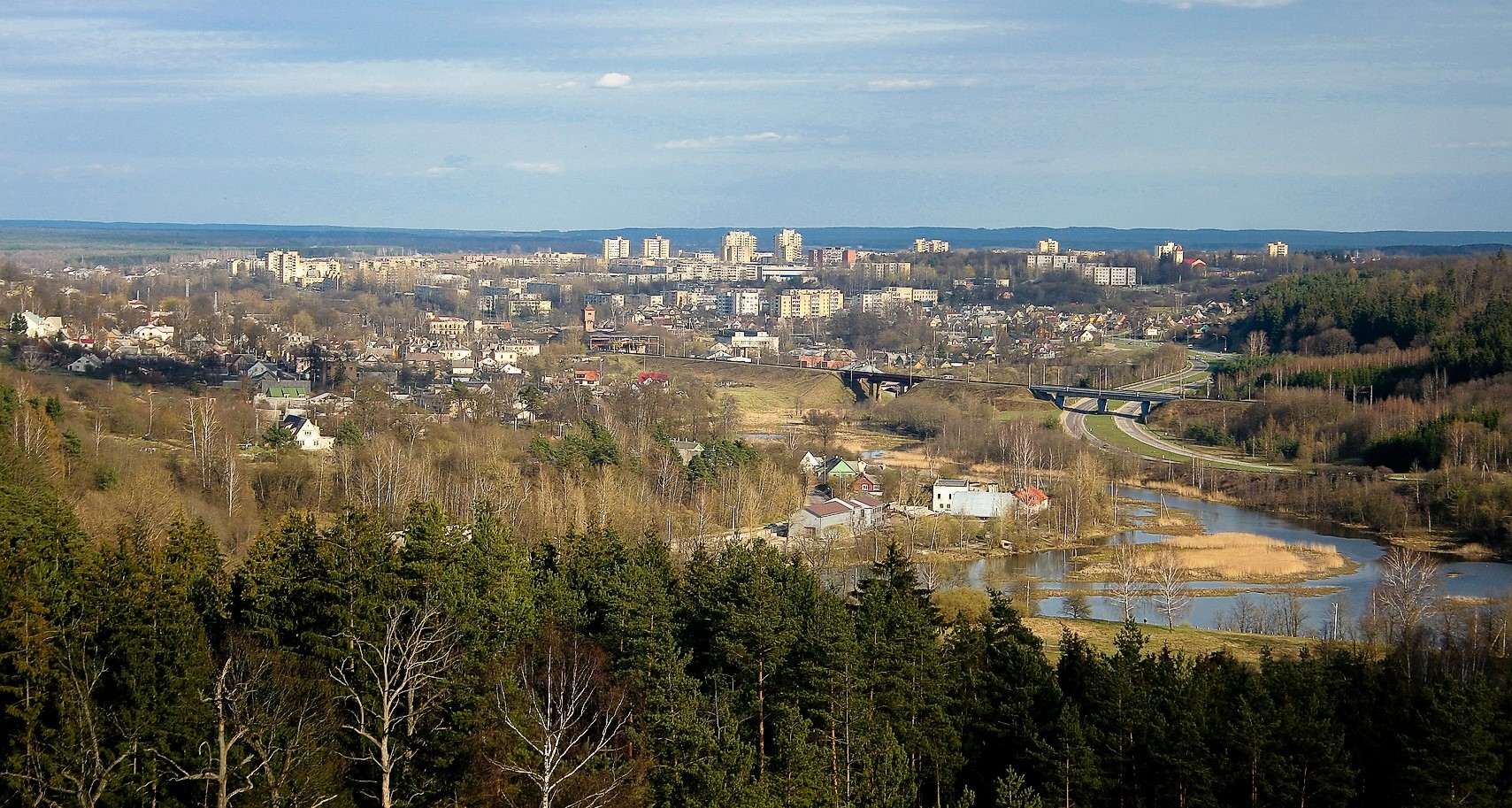
- Naujoji Vilnia as seen from surrounding hills

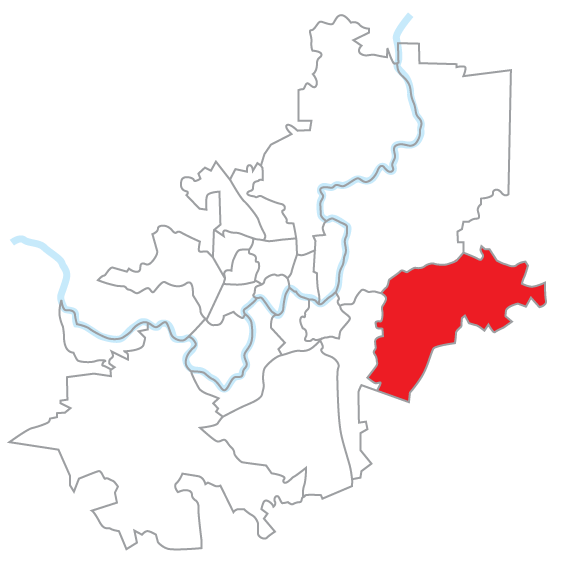
- Country: Lithuania
- County: Vilnius County
- Municipality: Vilnius city municipality

Area
  - Total: 39.3 km^{2} (15.2 sq mi)

Population (2023)
  - Total: 42,545
  - Density: 1,080/km^{2} (2,800/sq mi)
- Time zone: UTC+2 (EET)
  - Summer (DST): UTC+3 (EEST)

Naujoji Vilnia is an eldership in eastern Vilnius, Lithuania situated along the banks of the Vilnia River. According to the 2011 census, the district had a population of 31,933. This figure grew to 36,507 in 2021, when the newest census was performed. The ethnographic composition is very diverse, but is also changing because of construction boom in Pavilnys and Kalnėnai neighborhoods of Naujoji Vilnia.

== History ==
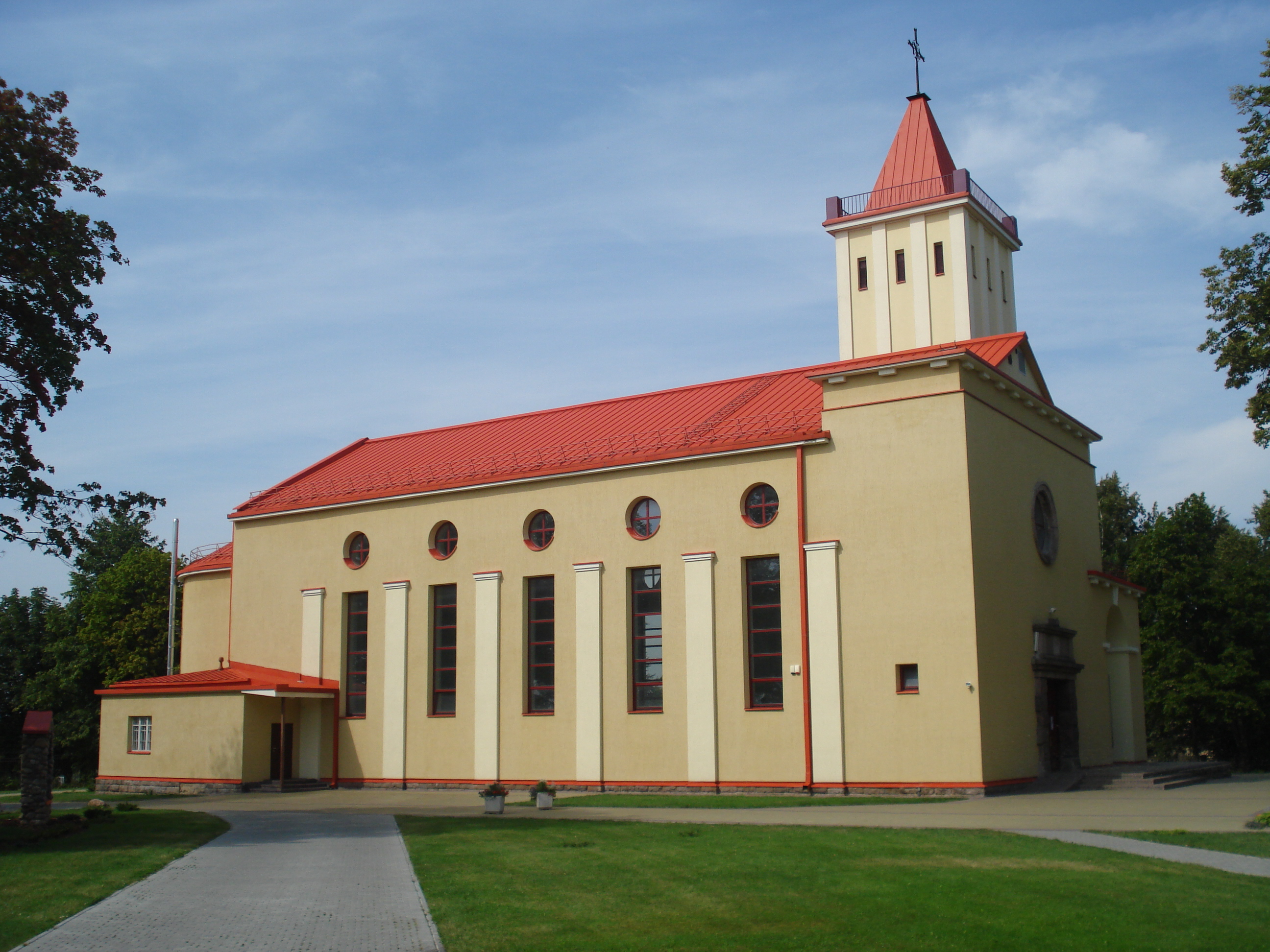
Church of Our Lady Queen of Peace in Naujoji Vilnia

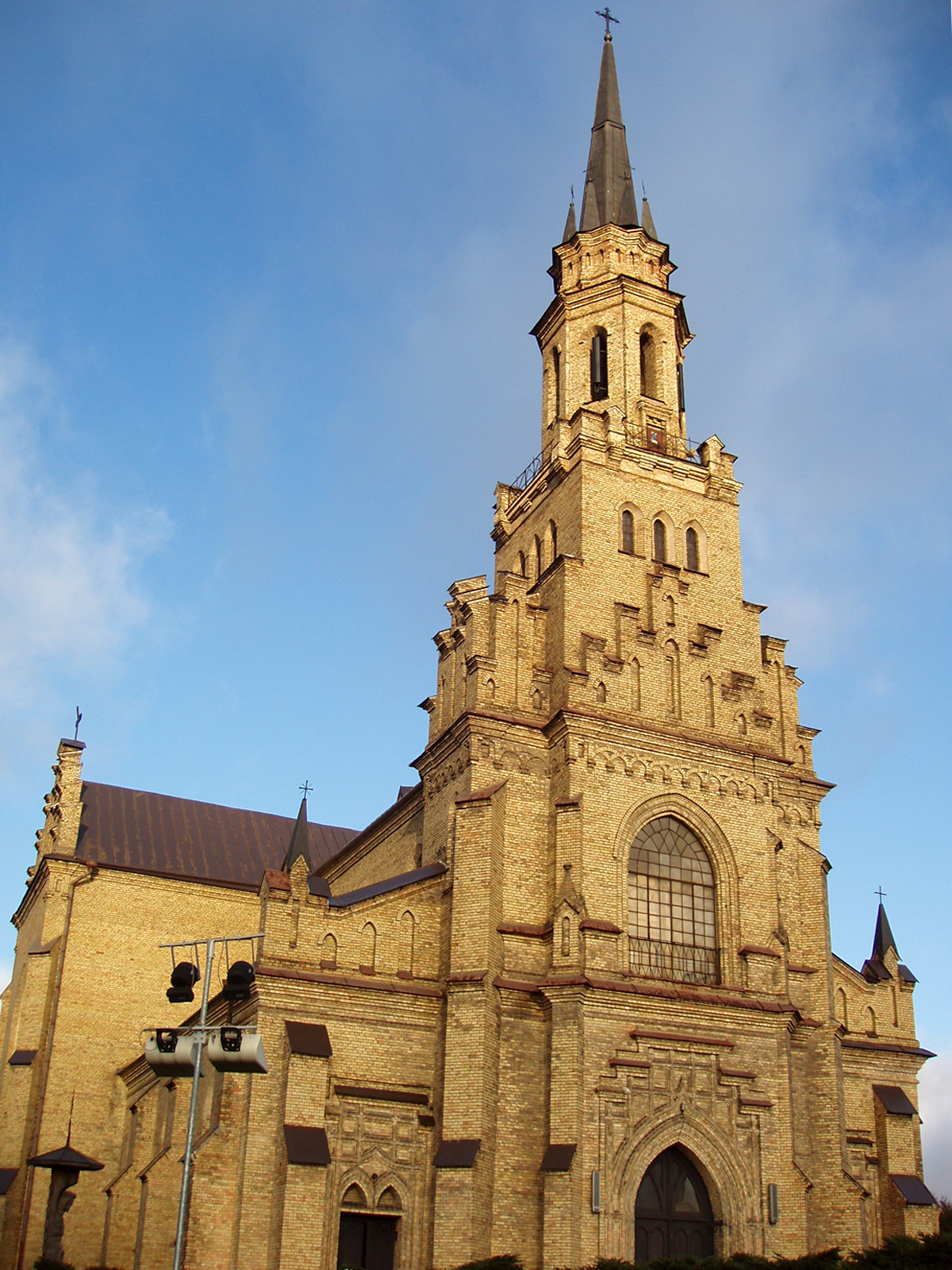
The church of St. Casimir in Naujoji Vilnia

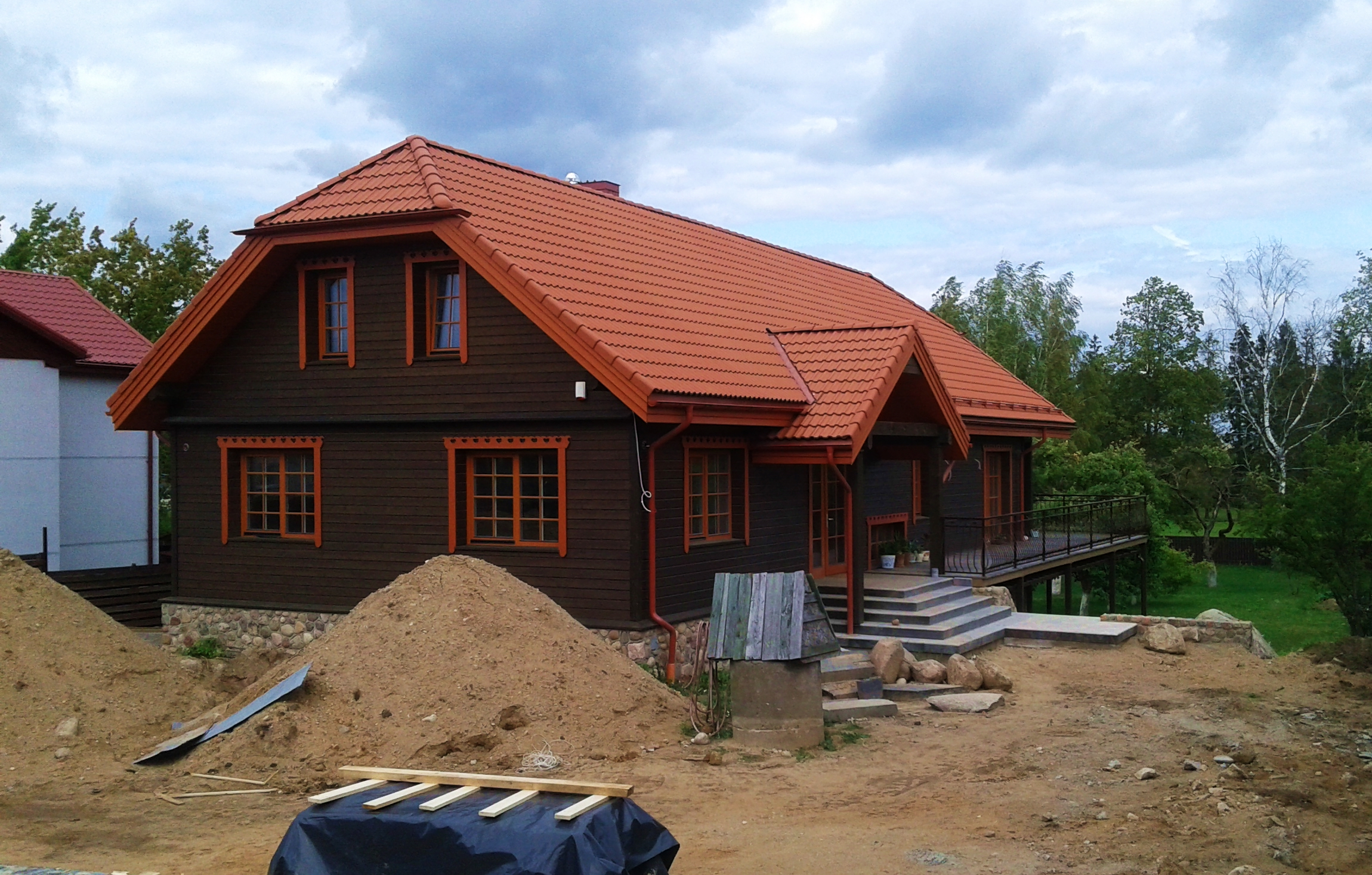
Reconstruction of an old building in Naujoji Vilnia

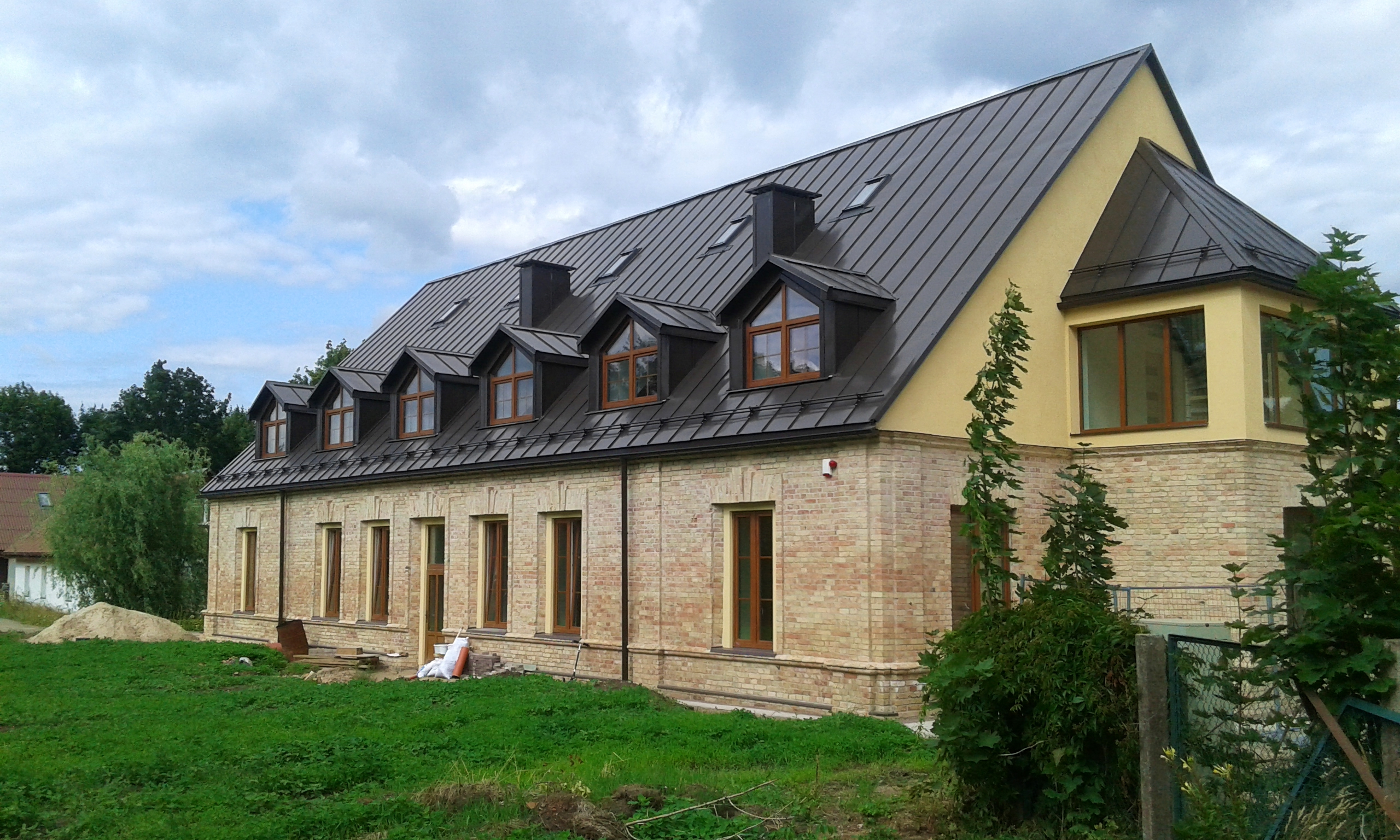
An old building in Naujoji Vilnia

New Vileika emerged as a separate town in the second half of the 19th century when the Warsaw – Saint Petersburg Railway was built. It grew as a narrow strip along the rails. Then another major Libau–Romny Railway line connecting Vilnius with Minsk was built. Before World War I, Naujoji Vilnia was one of the most industrialized cities in Lithuania, growing to 10,300 inhabitants in 1903, one of the largest in Lithuania at the time (comp. to Alytus with 3,445, Marijampolė with 6,777 or Panevėžys with 12,968 inhabitants in 1897). It had a number of metal and wood manufacturing factories, yeast, scythes, knives, paper and knitting mills.

In 1878, industrialists Wyszwianski and Szereszewski hailing from Berlin came to Naujoji Vilnia and established a German-Russian nail factory with 90 workers. In 1882, the factory was bought by the wealthiest man in Lübeck of the time Emil Possehl. Additionally, 60 specialists from Styria were invited to work at the plant. Raw materials, from which scythes were produced were from Emil Possehl's steel factory in Sweden. In 1886, 1 million scythes were produced a year. In 1900 scythes produced in Naujoji Vilnia were demonstrated at The 1900 World's Fair in Paris. In 1905 there were 450 laborers working in the factory. Before World War I, already more than 3 million scythes were produced at the factory annually. The scythes and nail factory in Naujoji Vilnia was the largest in the World at the time.

In 1911, The Church of St. Casimir was built.

During mass deportations to Siberia in June 1941, some 30,000 deportees passed through the Naujoji Vilnia railway station. After World War II, former shops were nationalized by the Soviet authorities and converted into large factories for machine tools, agricultural equipment and other factories. In 1957 it was incorporated into Vilnius city.

In May 1991, pro-Soviet politicians associated with Yedinstvo unilaterally proclaimed the illegal establishment of the so-called Polish National-Territorial Region, projected in the ethnically-mixed Vilnius Region district just outside of Vilnius, complete with its own flag, anthem, bank and the "capital" at Naujoji Vilnia. In August of the same year Lithuanian authorities cracked down on these actions as separatists in the area had supported the failed August Putsch in Moscow.

== Demographics ==
During the last two decades between the 2001 and 2021 censuses, the percentage of Lithuanians grew from 29.5% to 47.9% (17,493 persons), while the percentage of Poles shrank from 34.2% to 26.4% (9,646 inhabitants), Russians — from 19.8% to 13.3% (4,858 persons), Belarusians from 9% to 5.8% (2,105 inhabitants), Ukrainians — from 1.5% to 1.1% (390). There were also 2,008 inhabitants of other ethnicity.

== Notable people ==
- Tadeusz Konwicki, Polish writer

== Twin towns ==
- (Poland) Konstancin-Jeziorna
