= Marijampolė railway station =

Train station in Lithuania

Marijampolė
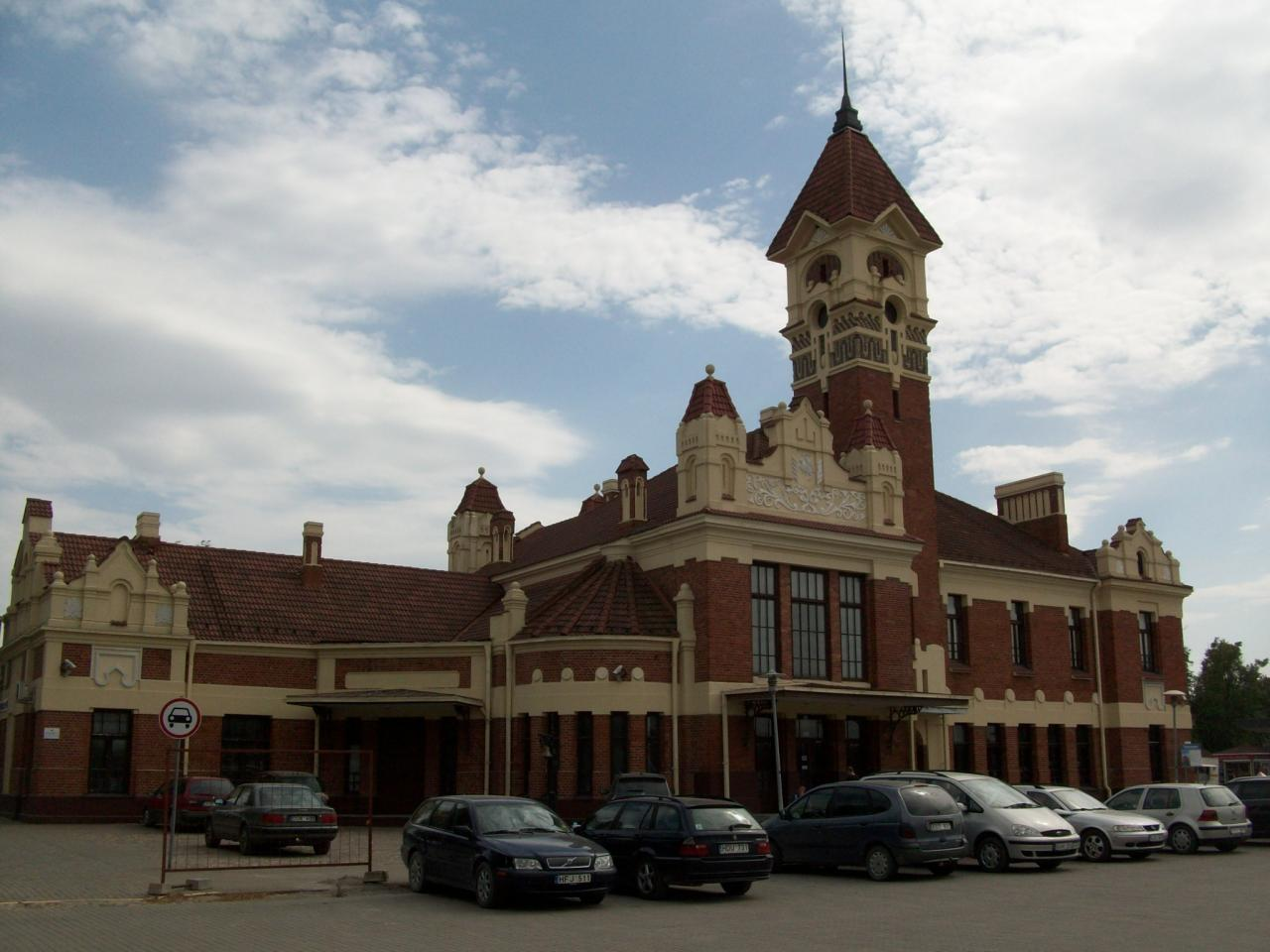

General information
- Location: Stoties g. 2 Marijampolė; Lithuania
- Coordinates: 54°33′26″N 23°21′52″E
- Owner: Lithuanian Railways

Construction
- Architect: Edmundas Alfonsas Frykas
- Architectural style: Modern, Historism

History
- Opened: 1924

Services
Preceding station	LTG Link	Following station
Mockava towards Kraków, Poland via Mockava	Vilnius—Warsaw—Kraków	Kazlu Ruda towards Vilnius
Terminus	Kaunas—Marijampolė	Būdviečiai towards Kaunas
Location
- Location within Lithuania

Marijampolė railway station (Lithuanian: Marijampolės geležinkelio stotis) is a Lithuanian Railways station serving the city of Marijampolė in southern Lithuania.

Its station building is one of the most ornate buildings of its type in Lithuania. It was designed by the architect Edmundas Frykas in Art Deco architectural style.

== Gallery ==
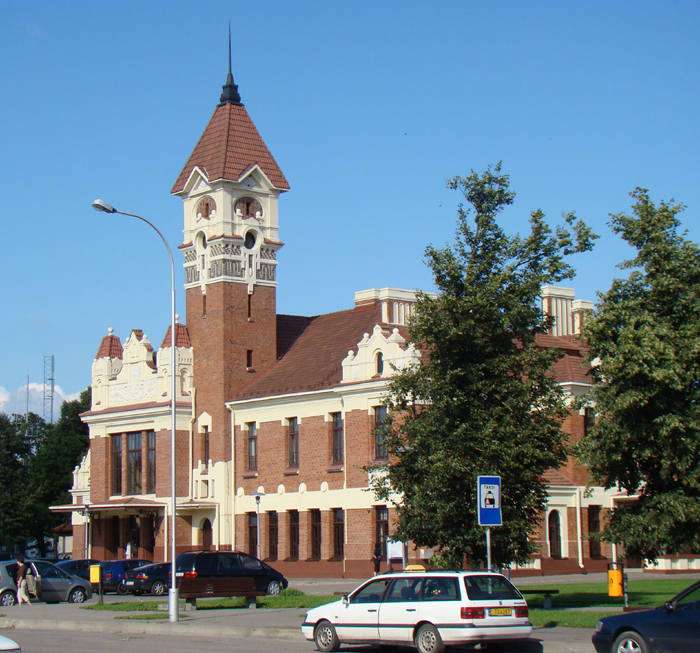

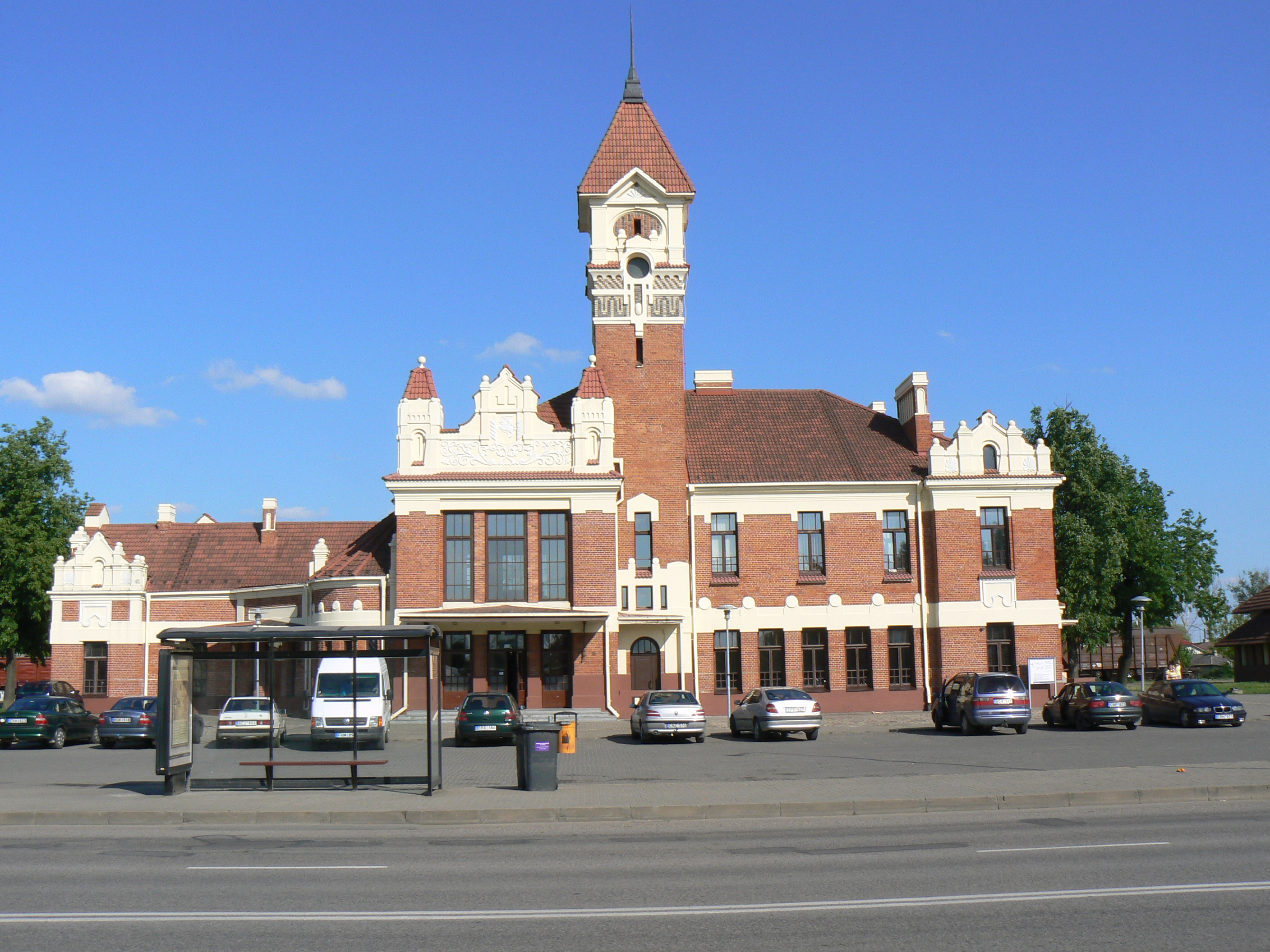
Front facade

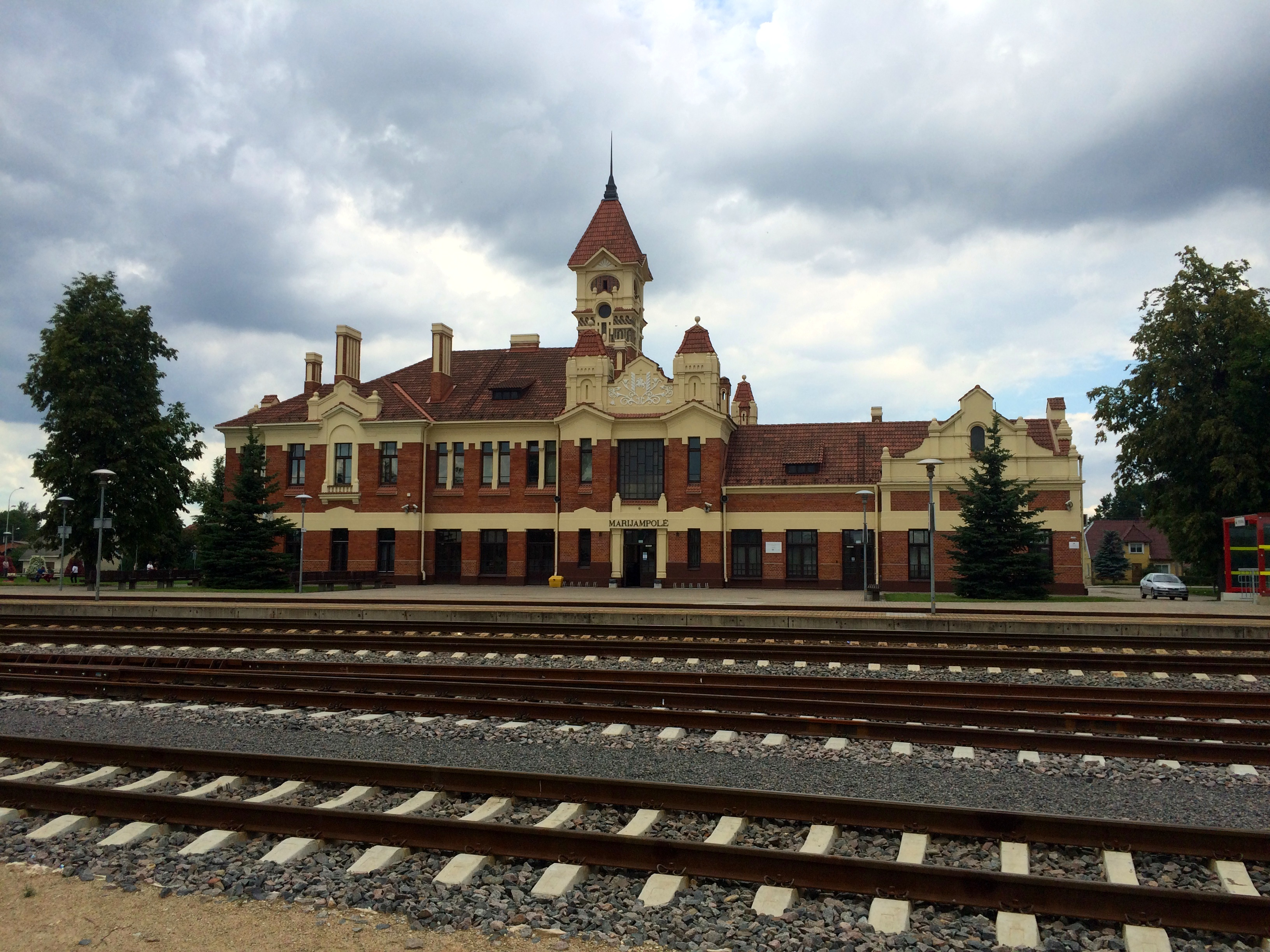
Railway side of the station

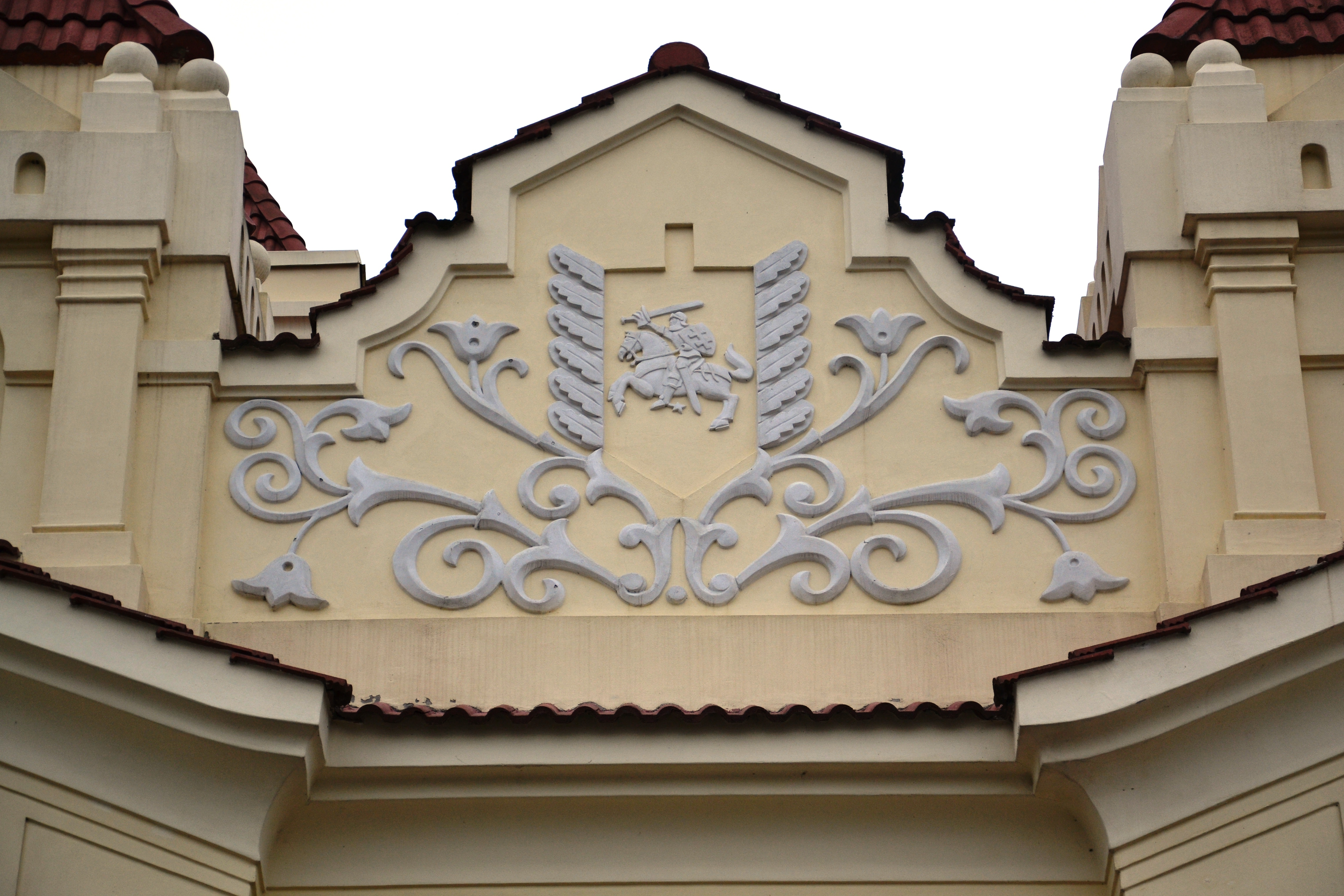
Station decoration with Vytis in the center

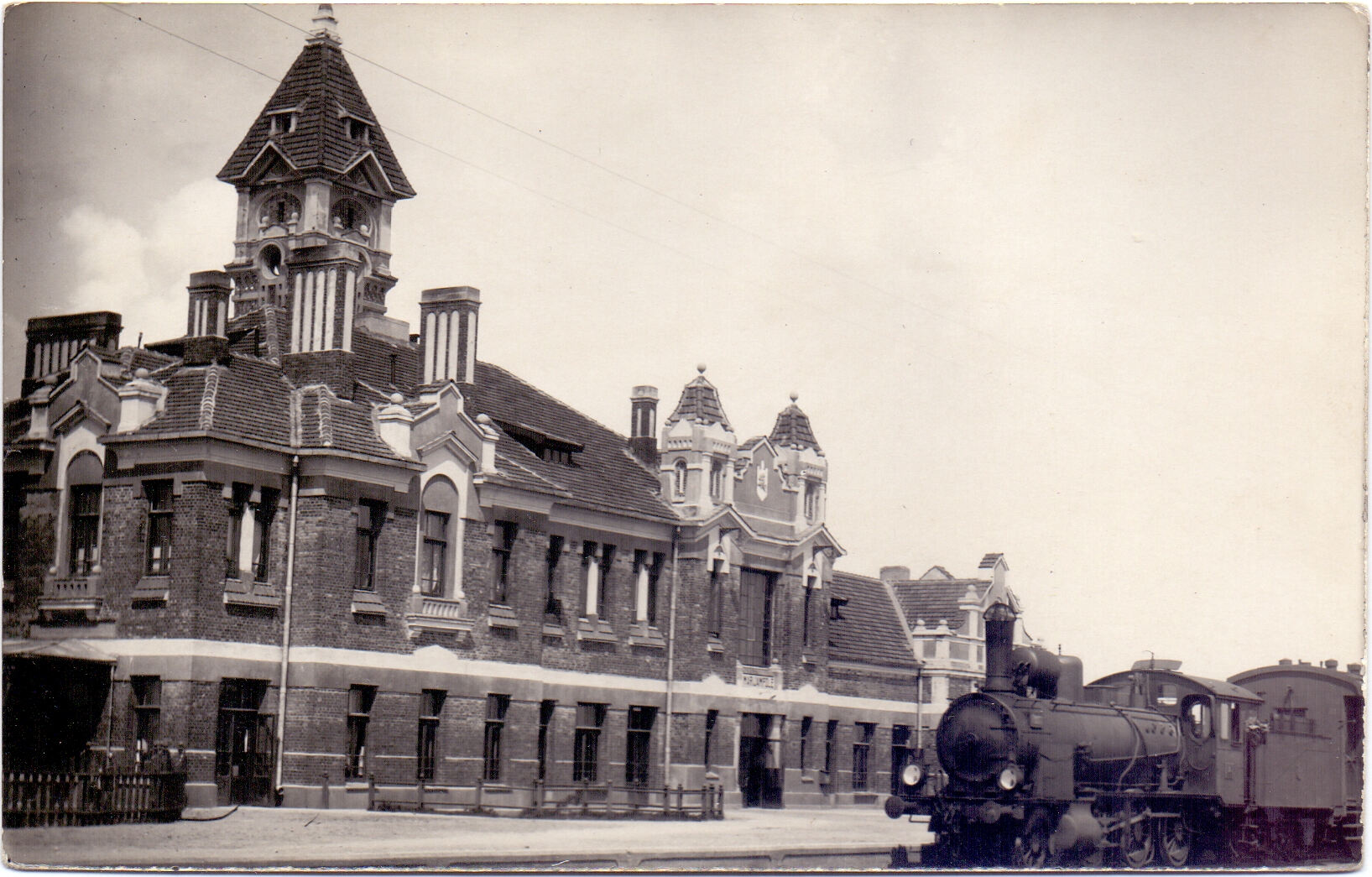
Station in 1940

Map of the Lithuanian railway network

== See also ==
- List of railway stations in Lithuania
- Rail transport in Lithuania
- Transport in Lithuania
