= Joniškis railway station =

Railway station in Lithuania

Coordinates: 56.2310°N 23.5995°E

Joniškis
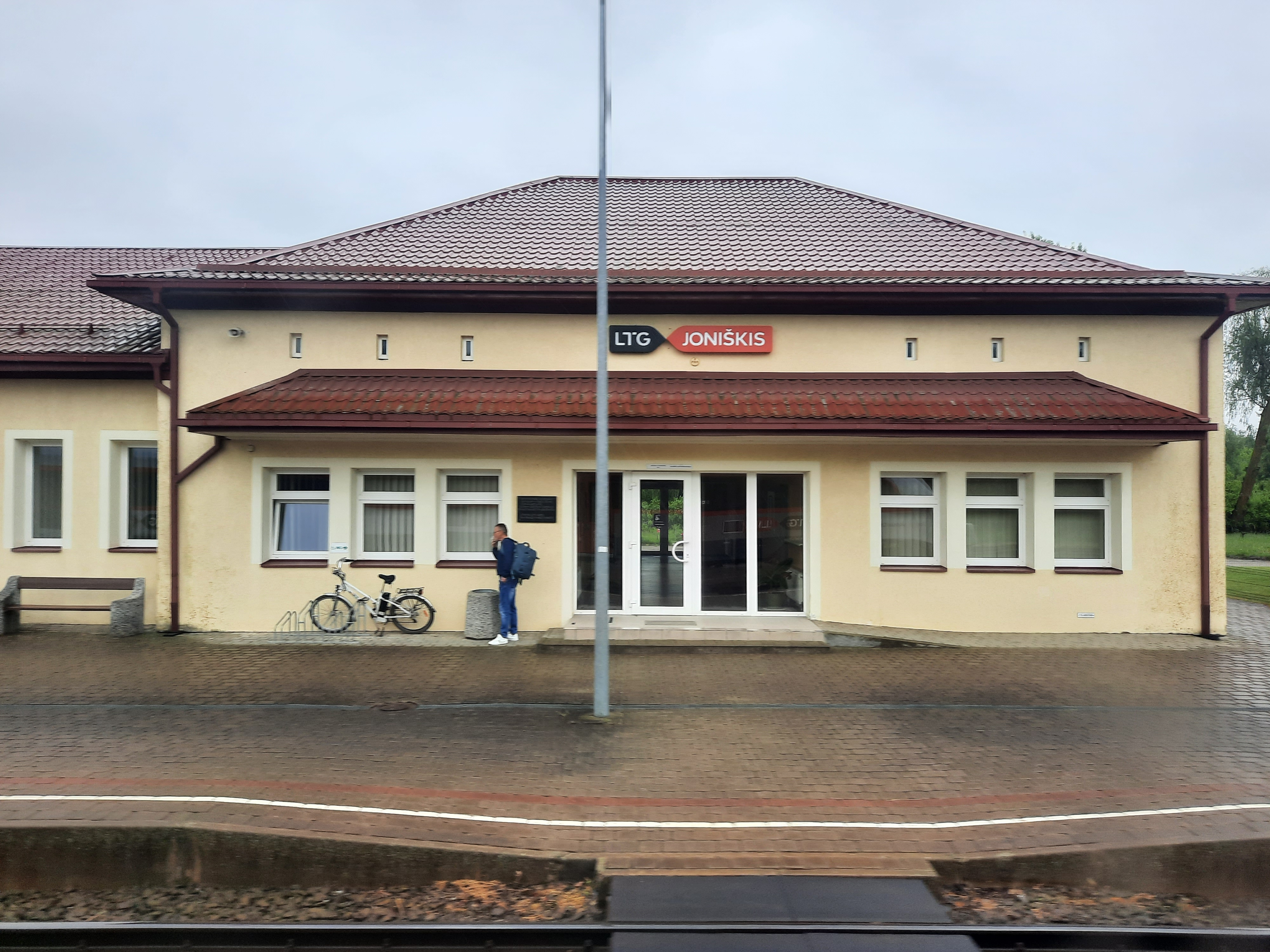
- Joniškis railway station in 2025

General information
- Location: Stoties g. 28; Joniškis; Lithuania
- Operator: LTG Link

History
- Opened: 1916

Services
Preceding station	LTG Link	Following station
Šiauliai towards Vilnius	Vilnius—Riga	Jelgava, Latvia towards Riga, Latvia
Location
- Location within Lithuania

Joniškis railway station is a railway station on Stoties str. 28, in the southwestern part of Joniškis, northern Lithuania. International trains from Vilnius to Riga stop here. The station is located on the Šiauliai–Jelgava railway section. The main building of the station is already the third to be built, but the first (wooden) has also survived.

== History ==
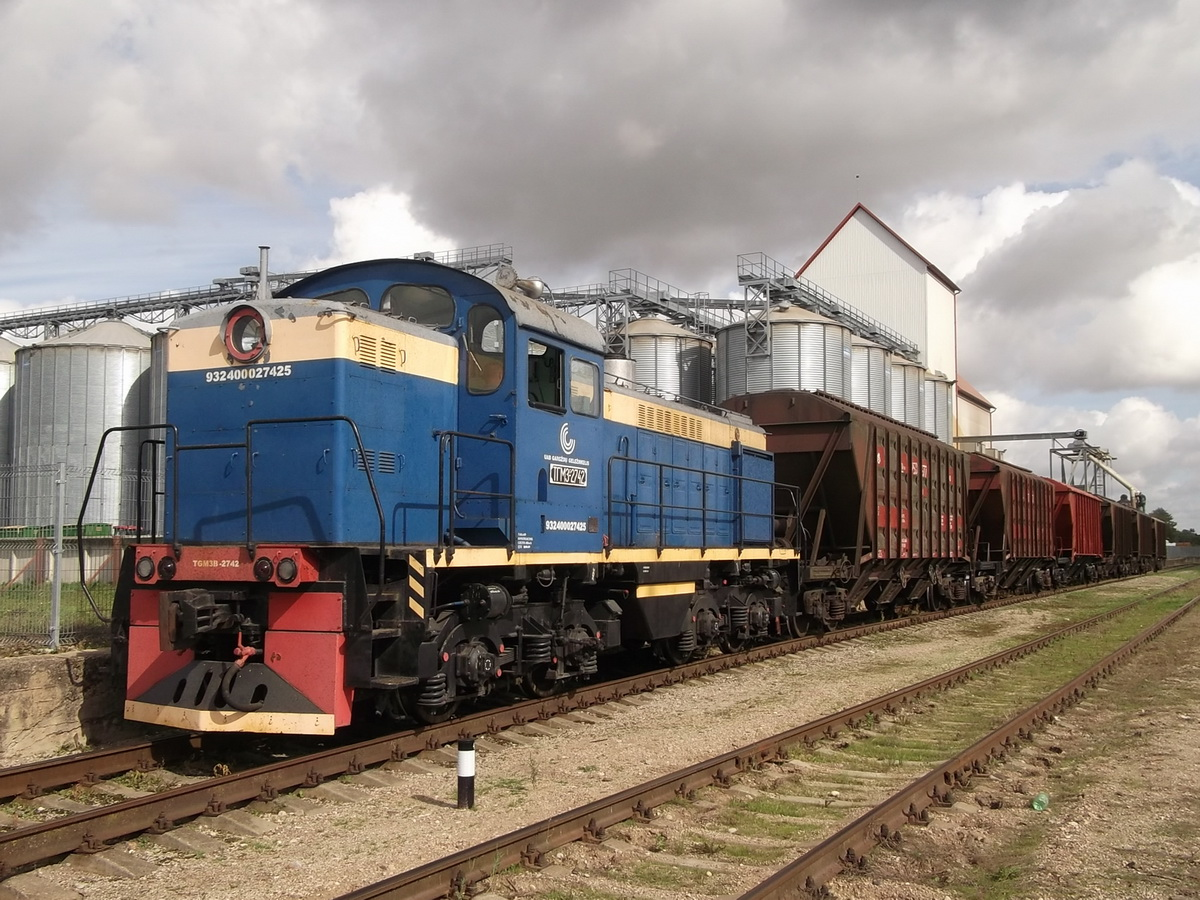
Train at Joniškis station

During World War I, the Šiauliai–Jelgava Railway was built through Joniškis, and in 1916 a railway station was installed here. In 1922, the Joniškis–Žeimelis narrow-gauge railway started operating. The railway, which was built through Joniskis, was used in 1916. The German military command began to urgently handle the railways, converting the wide Russian gauge to a width of 1435 mm. For military purposes, the German forces also built 92 km of roadway between Šiauliai, Joniškis, and Jelgava . For frontal affairs, imperial Germany built a number of railways in Lithuania with a width of 600 mm, including a Joniškis–Žeimelis line.

At the end of the twentieth century, the station building was repaired. Until 14 January 2004, Vilnius–Riga trains served the station (although the Vilnius-Riga trains briefly returned from September 2018 until March 2020, they did not stop here). On 27 December 2023, the route was resumed, this time with a station in Joniškis. Prime Minister Ingrida Šimonytė, Minister of Transport Marius Skuodis, and other Lithuanian politicians rode on the first train to Riga to meet Latvian politicians.

Map of the Lithuanian railway network

== See also ==
- List of railway stations in Lithuania
- Rail transport in Lithuania
- Transport in Lithuania
