= Church of St. Casimir, Naujoji Vilnia =

Church in Vilnius, Lithuania

Coordinates: 54°41′51″N 25°24′38″E

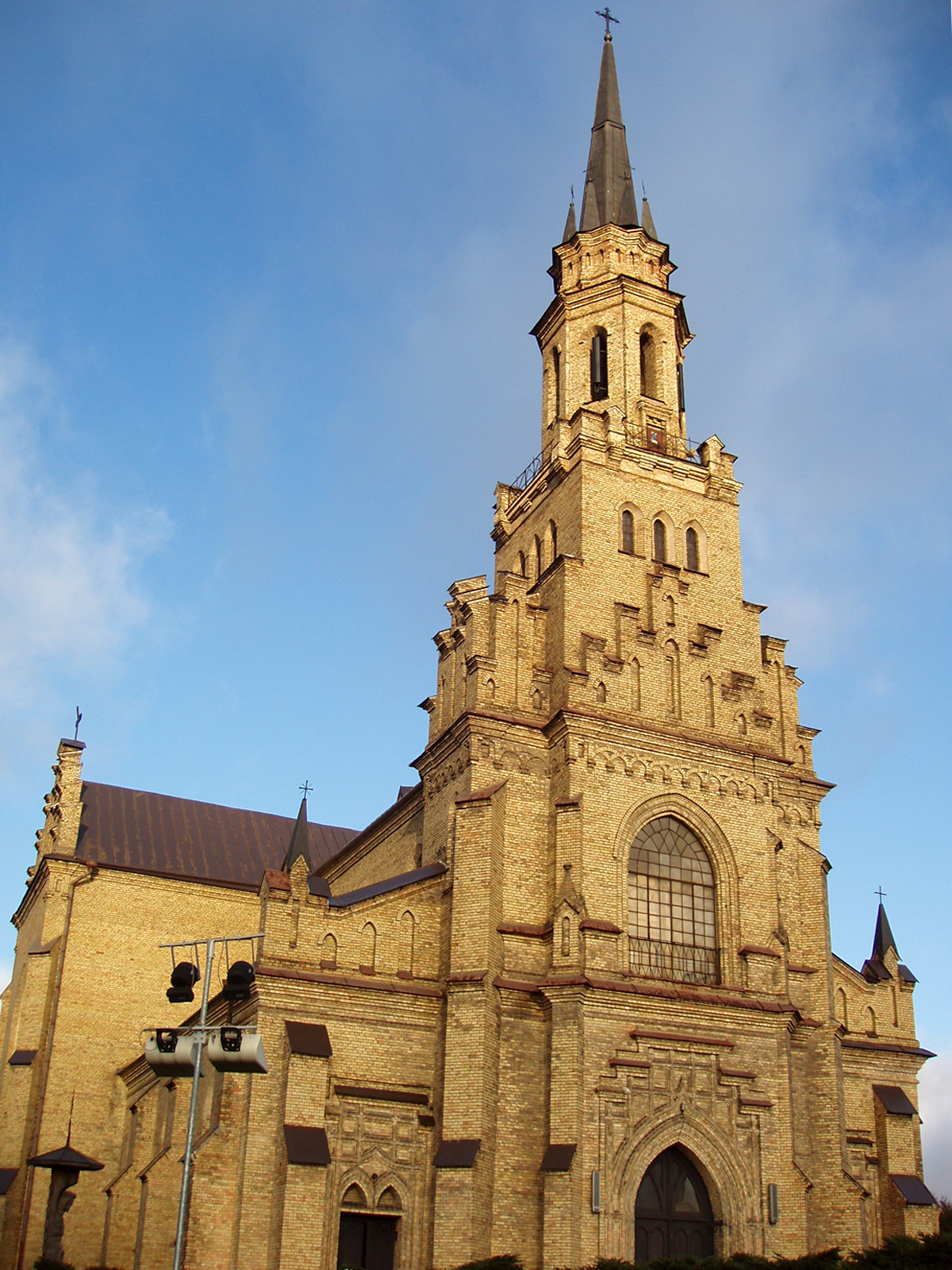
Church of Naujoji Vilnia

Church of St. Casimir is a historicist style church in Naujoji Vilnia elderate of Vilnius, Lithuania. Current shape church was erected in 1911. Naujoji Vilnia church is one of the tallest churches in Vilnius.
