= Turmantas railway station =

Railway station in Lithuania

Turmantas
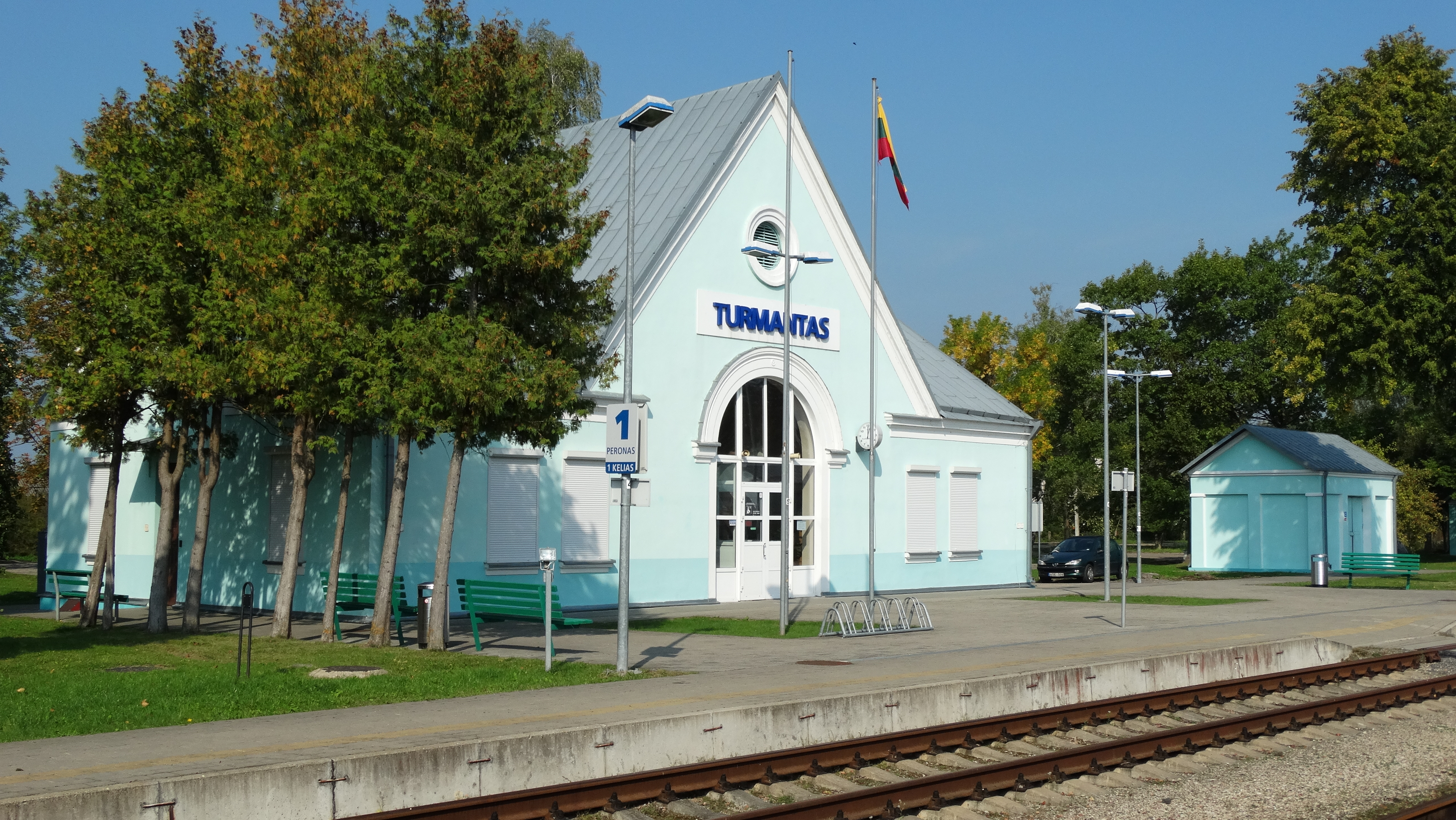
- Train station in 2016

General information
- Location: Stoties str. 8 Turmantas; Lithuania
- Coordinates: 55°41′59″N 26°27′57″E
- Owner: Lithuanian Railways
- Platforms: 2
- Tracks: 5
- Train operators: Lithuanian Railways

Construction
- Accessible: Available

History
- Opened: 1862

Services
Preceding station	LTG Link	Following station
Visaginas towards Vilnius	Vilnius—Turmantas	Terminus
Location
- Location within Lithuania

Turmantas railway station (Lithuanian: Turmanto geležinkelio stotis) is a railway passenger and cargo station serving the town of Turmantas in Zarasai district, Lithuania. The station is located on the Lithuanian-Latvian border, at the end of railway line Vilnius - Turmantas. Closest railway stations are situated in Visaginas to the south and Daugavpils (Lithuanian: Daugpilis) to the north.

Turmantas's coat of arms features two steel horses, which are the symbols of railways.

== History ==
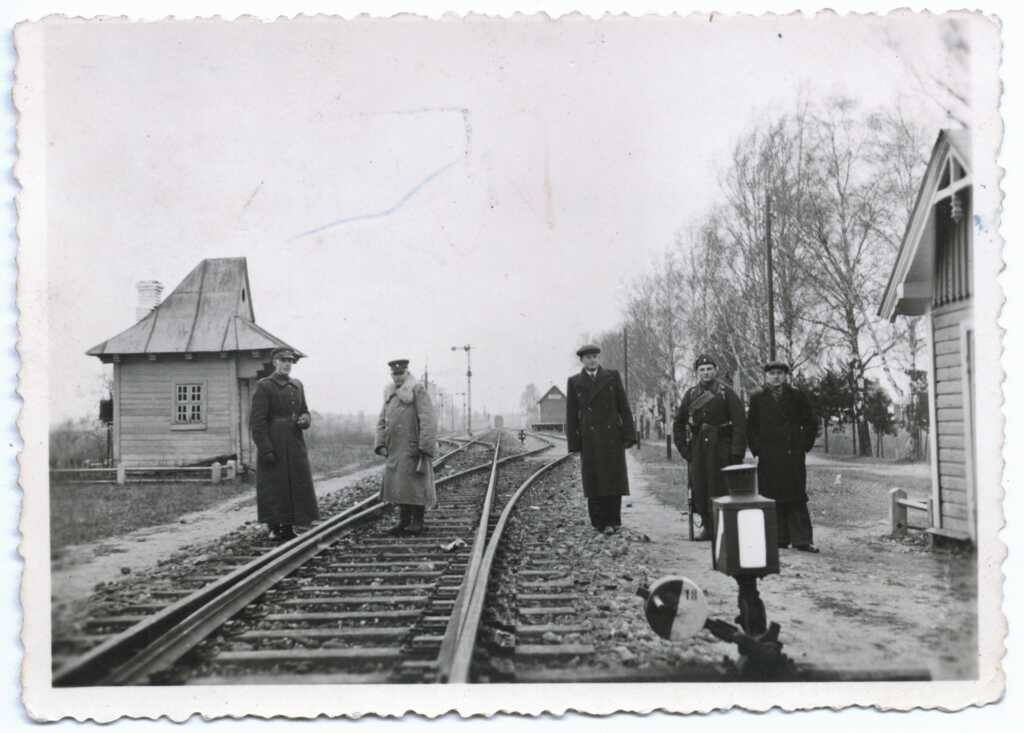
Border guards at Turmantas station in 1939.

Turmantas railway station was built as a fourth-class railway station and opened in 1862 while building Saint Petersburg–Warsaw Railway. It was built between Dūkštas and Kalkuny (Russian: Калкуны, currently named Daugavpils) stations, approximately half-way on the railway line. During the tsarist era the station was called Novoaleksandrovsk (Russian: Новоалександровск, currently named Zarasai), then Turmont. During World War II retaliating Nazi army, among other stations on this railway line, destroyed the passenger hall. It was rebuilt between 1945 and 1960.

== Services ==
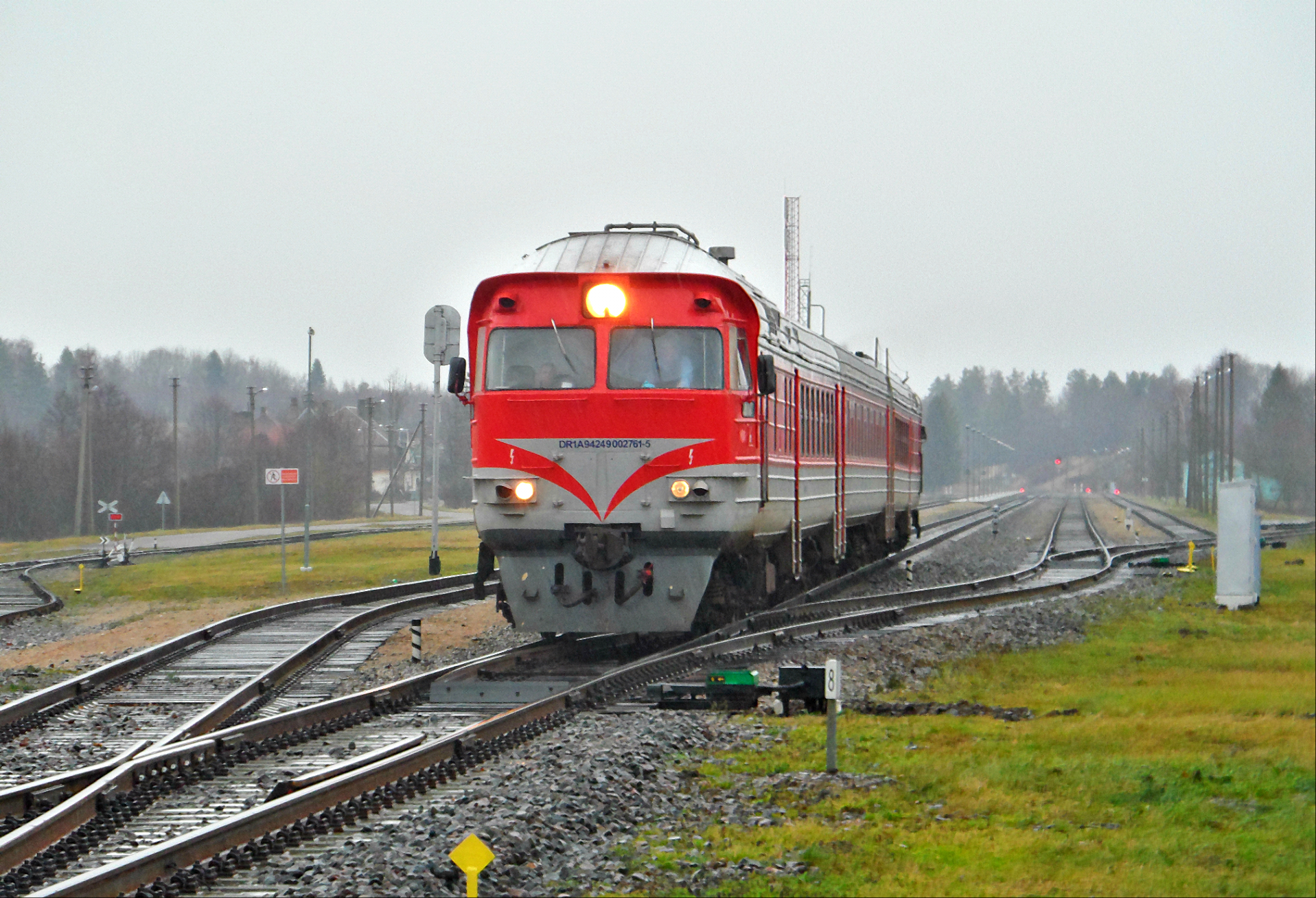
Diesel multiple unit DR1A arriving to the station

Map of the Lithuanian railway network

Currently it is a terminus for a train passenger service Vilnius - Ignalina - Turmantas. In 2015, service through Turmantas on the route Vilnius - Daugavpils - St. Petersburg was canceled, which was the oldest train service in Lithuania since the opening of the Saint Petersburg–Warsaw Railway, also passing through this station. Until 2018, a route Vilnius - Turmantas - Daugavpils was also stopping at this station, when all services along Turmantas - Daugavpils were cancelled. LTG Link is considering reopening this link once Latvia completes repairs.

== See also ==
- List of railway stations in Lithuania
- Rail transport in Lithuania
- Transport in Lithuania
