= Church of St. Casimir the Prince, Kraków =

Roman Catholic church in Kraków, Poland

Church of St. Casimir the Prince
- Kościół św. Kazimierza Królewicza
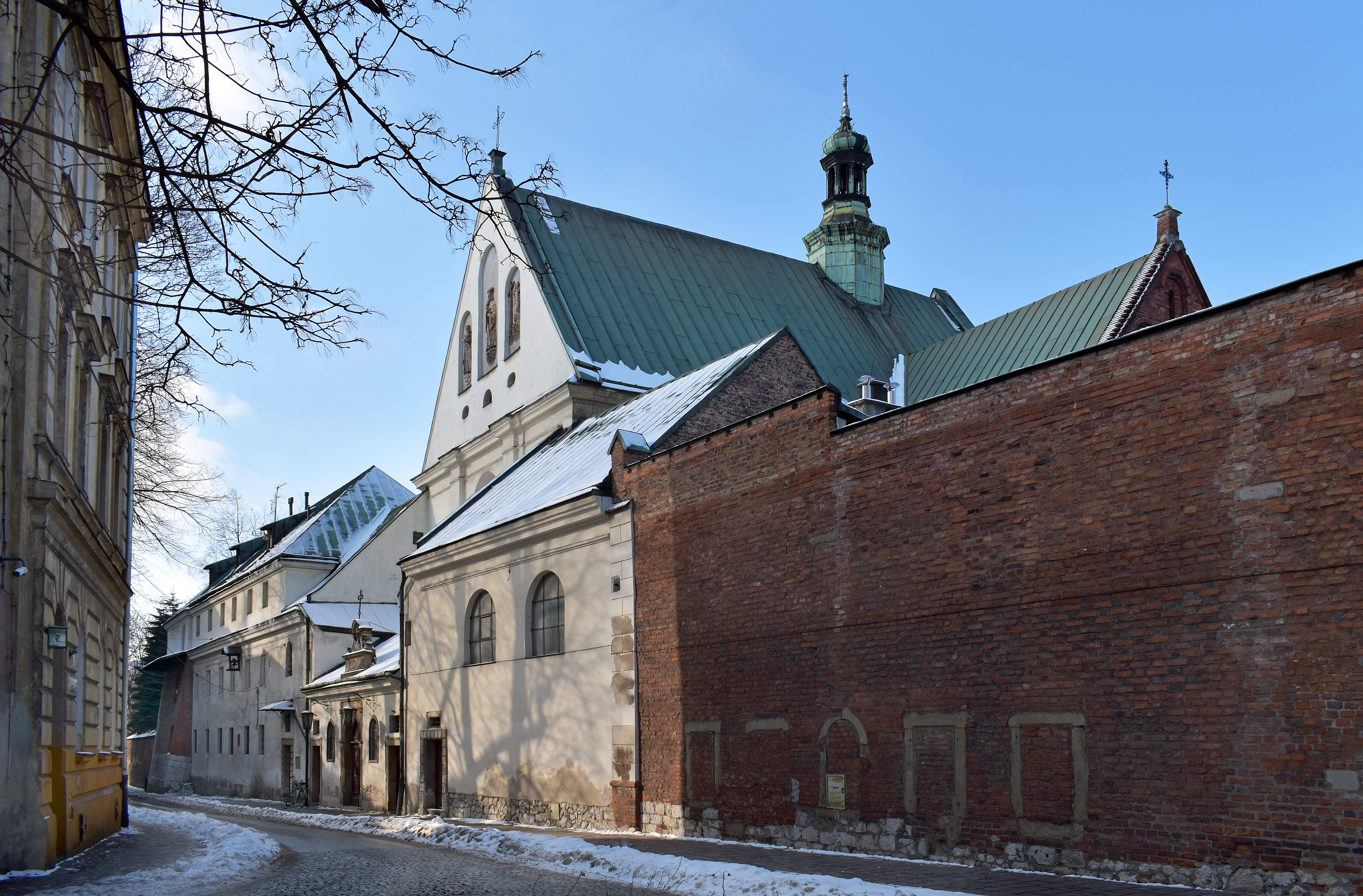
- Church and monastery
- Church of St. Casimir the Prince
- 50°03′53.5″N 19°56′10.4″E
- Location: Kraków
- Address: 4 Reformacka Street
- Country: Poland
- Denomination: Roman Catholic

History
- Consecrated: 1672

UNESCO World Heritage Site
- Type: Cultural
- Criteria: iv
- Designated: 1978
- Part of: Historic Centre of Kraków
- Reference no.: 29
- Region: Europe and North America

Historic Monument of Poland
- Designated: 1994-09-08
- Part of: Kraków – historic city center
- Reference no.: M.P. 1994 nr 50 poz. 418

The Church of St. Casimir the Prince (Polish: Kościół św. Kazimierza Królewicza) known colloquially as the Franciscan Observants Church (Polish: Kościół reformatów) is a historic Roman Catholic conventual church of the Franciscan Observants located at 4 Reformacka Street, in the Old Town of Kraków, Poland.

== History ==
The church was completed in 1640 thanks to a donation from Zuzanna Amendówna, bequeathed around 1644 along with the miracle painting of Madonna displayed today at the side altar of the new church. The first church of the Order was destroyed during the Swedish Deluge. In 1658 monks settled at the Reformacka street in a small manor given to them by Stanisław Warszycki, the castellan of Kraków. In 1666 suffragan bishop Mikołaj Oborski laid the foundation stone for the current church. The chief benefactor of the church and the monastery was Franciszek Szembek, a local noble and the castellan of Kamieniec. The newly built Baroque church was consecrated in 1672.

Inside the church there are late Baroque altars originating in 1745–1748. A crucifix stands atop the high altar in accordance with the basic rule of the Order. The Patron of the church, St. Casimir, has his facsimile painted at the side altar (first on the left). This image was most probably painted in 1660-1670 and is assumed to be the work of the Gdańsk painter Daniel Schultz. Paintings on the vault of the church date from 1904 and are the work of Aleksander Mroczkowski.

== The catacombs ==
On the outside wall of the Monastery there is an old, historic "bell for the dying" rung only when someone close to the Little Brothers dies. The bell is protected by a small roof. Below the bell is a plaque of black marble, written in reference to its foundation in 1750.

The monastic crypts with mummified bodies are made available for public viewing only once a year on All Souls Day (November 2), the day after All Saints Day. In the past, the mummies attracted crowds of visitors, causing unforeseen climatic challenges.

The catacombs in the crypt under the Church are among some of the most secret places in the city. Unique climatic conditions found in the basement caused the bodies of the dead to undergo a process of natural mummification whereby they remain in an excellent state of preservation. Among them, hidden away since 1667, are the remains of many monks and members of Polish noble families such as Wielopolscy, Szembekowie, and Morsztynowie. Monastic books reveal that in total almost 1,000 bodies were placed in the catacombs over the years, among them around 730 lay people and 250 monks. The remains of the monks – all sitting down – are placed right under the chancel of the church, without coffins, directly on earth and sand. In a glass coffin there is the body of Father Sebastian Wolicki. Among the most notable corpses is the body of Countess Domicella Skalska, who was employed by the Church as a housemaid for 20 years. She revealed her noble origin shortly before her death in 1864.

In the crypt there is also the body of a Napoleonic soldier, formerly dressed in full uniform, with a sabre and rifle. The monks' oral tradition holds that the soldier was seriously injured and dragged himself to the monastic gates in 1812. He died shortly afterwards, in the infirmary, without regaining consciousness. During World War II the Germans took away the weapons and set up an air raid shelter in the catacombs.

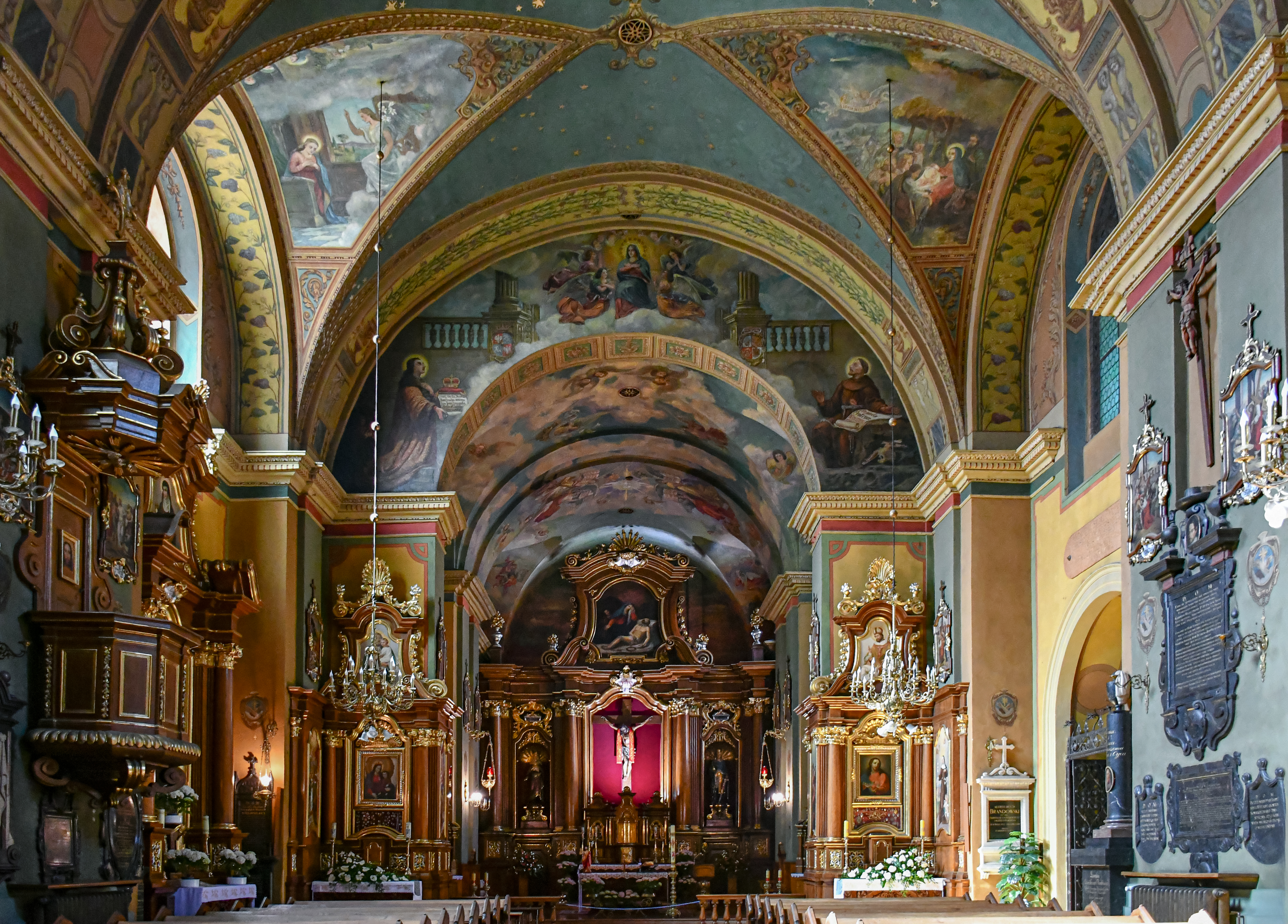
Interior: nave and altar

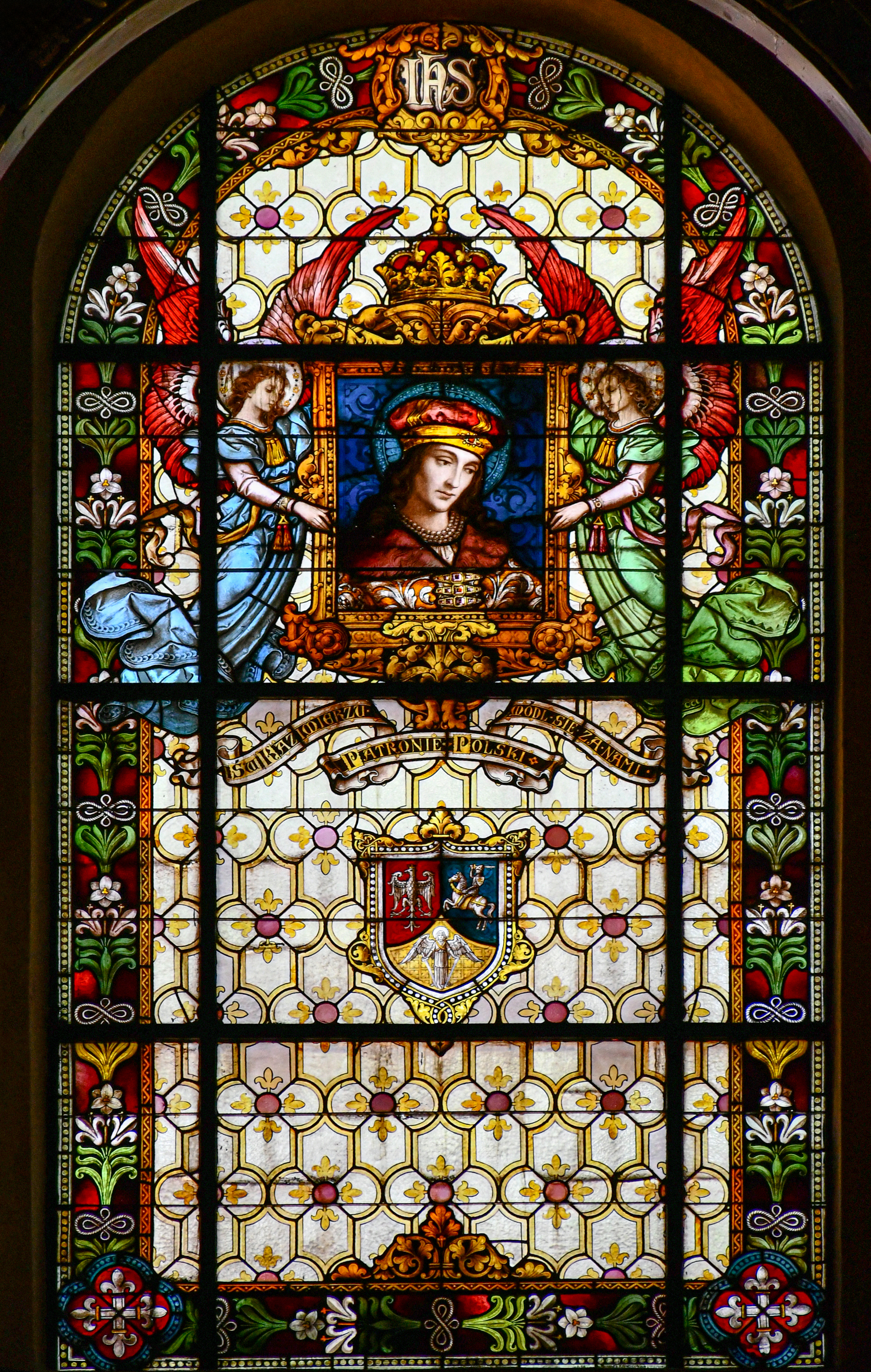
Interior: stained-glass window St. Casimir (1899 by Franz Borgias Mayer, Munich)

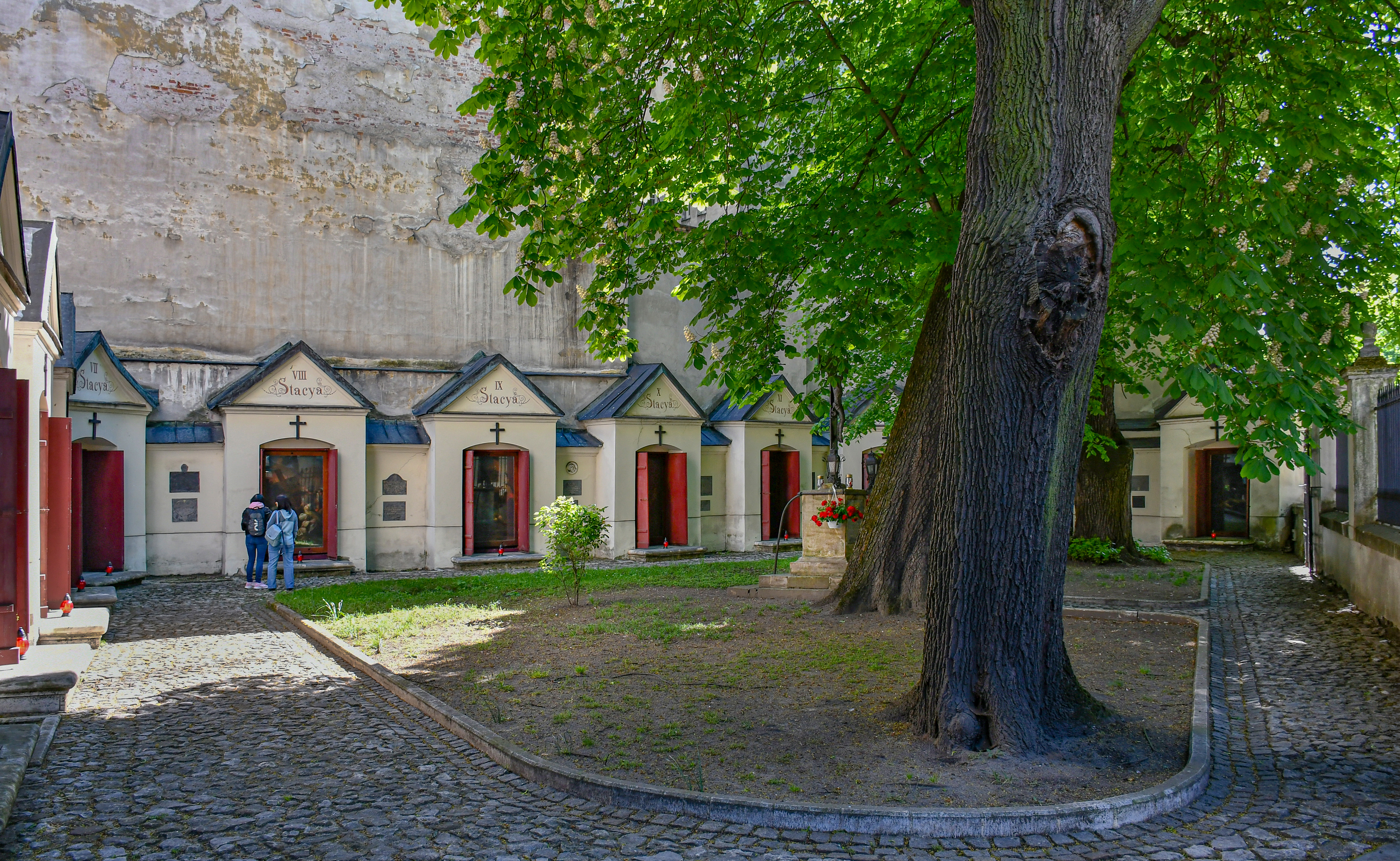
Former cemetery, now Stations of the Cross in front of the church

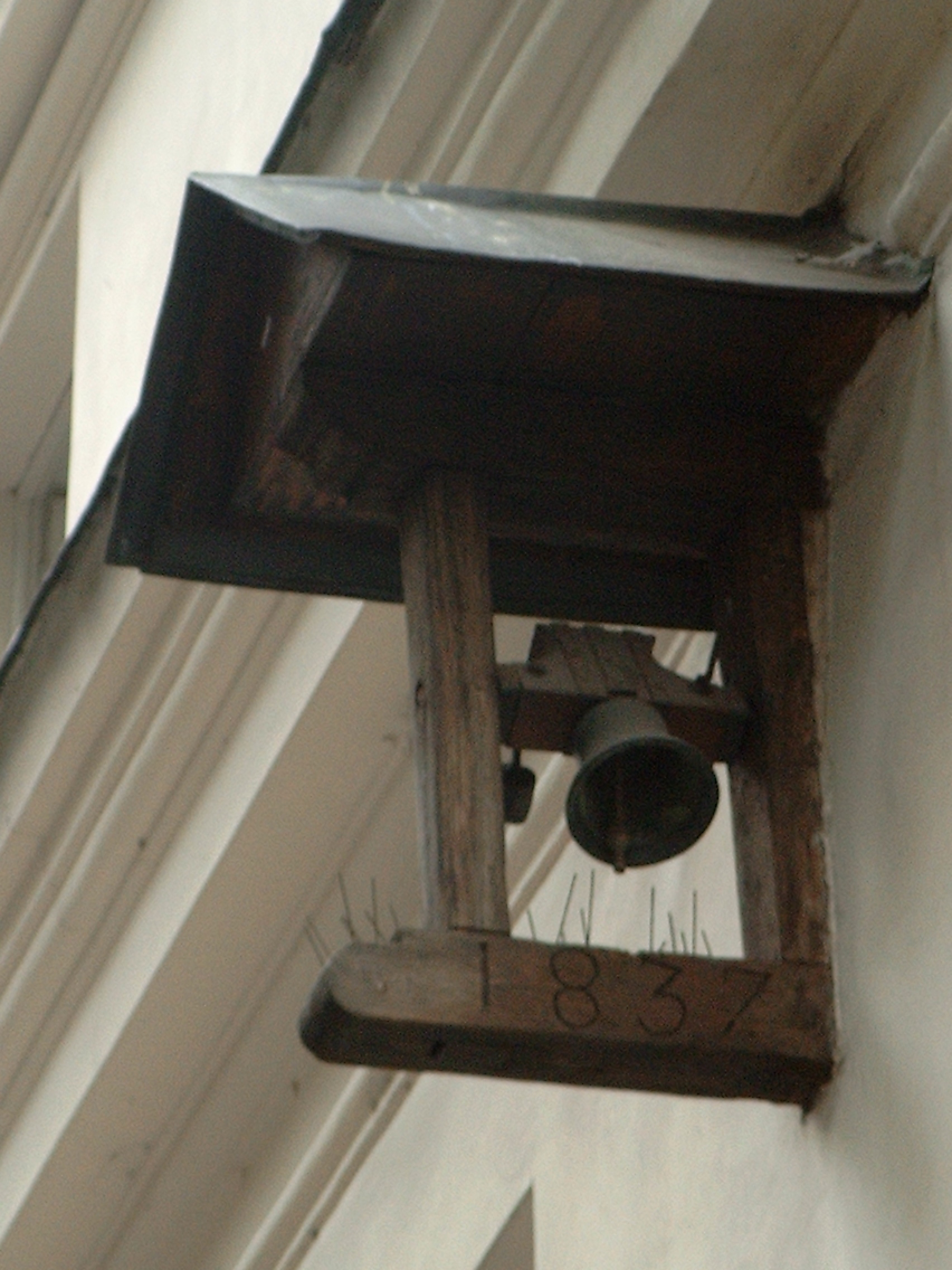
Dead bell
