= St. Casimir the Prince Church, Września =

Church in Września, Poland

Coordinates: 52°18′57″N 17°33′53″E

St. Casimir the Prince Church, Września (in Polish) Kościół św. Kazimierza Królewicza we Wrześni
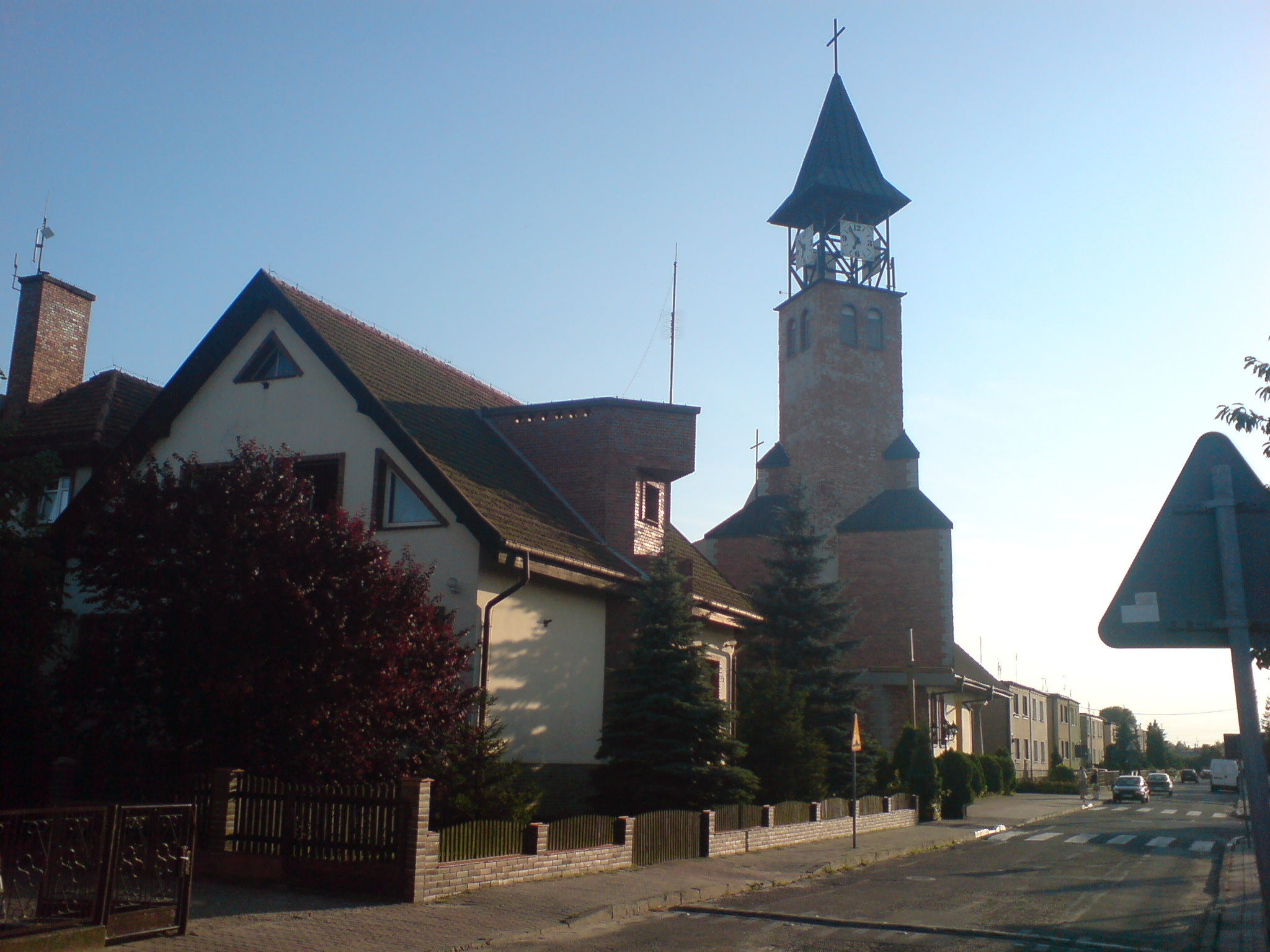

Religion
- Affiliation: Roman Catholic
- Province: Archdiocese of Gniezno
- Year consecrated: 1996

Location
- Location: Września
- Interactive map of St. Casimir the Prince Church, Września (in Polish) Kościół św. Kazimierza Królewicza we Wrześni

Specifications
- Direction of façade: south west
- Materials: brick

St. Casimir the Prince Church, Września - bricked church in the southern part of Września, located on Sławno district, on Słupska street.
