= Turmantas =

- Town
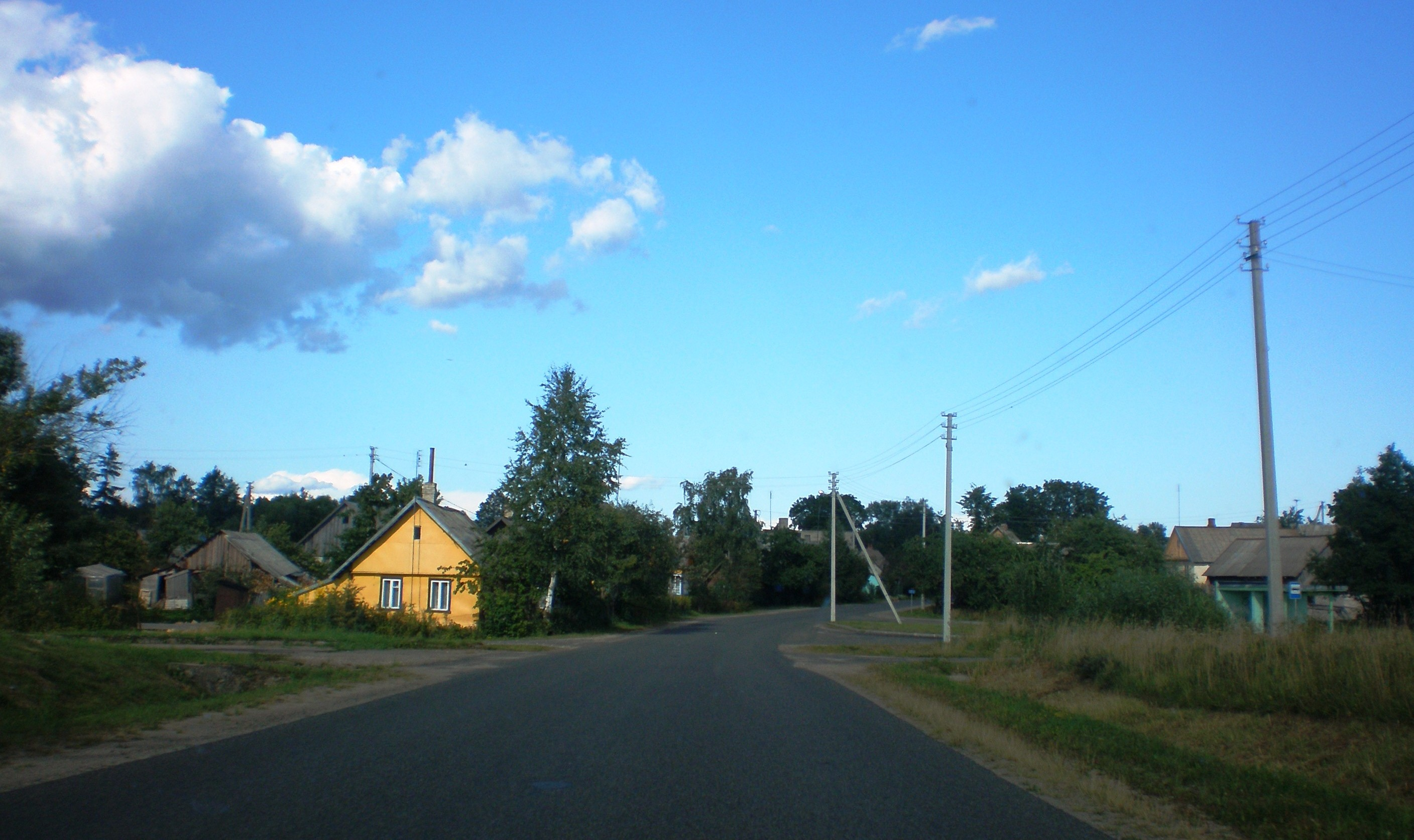

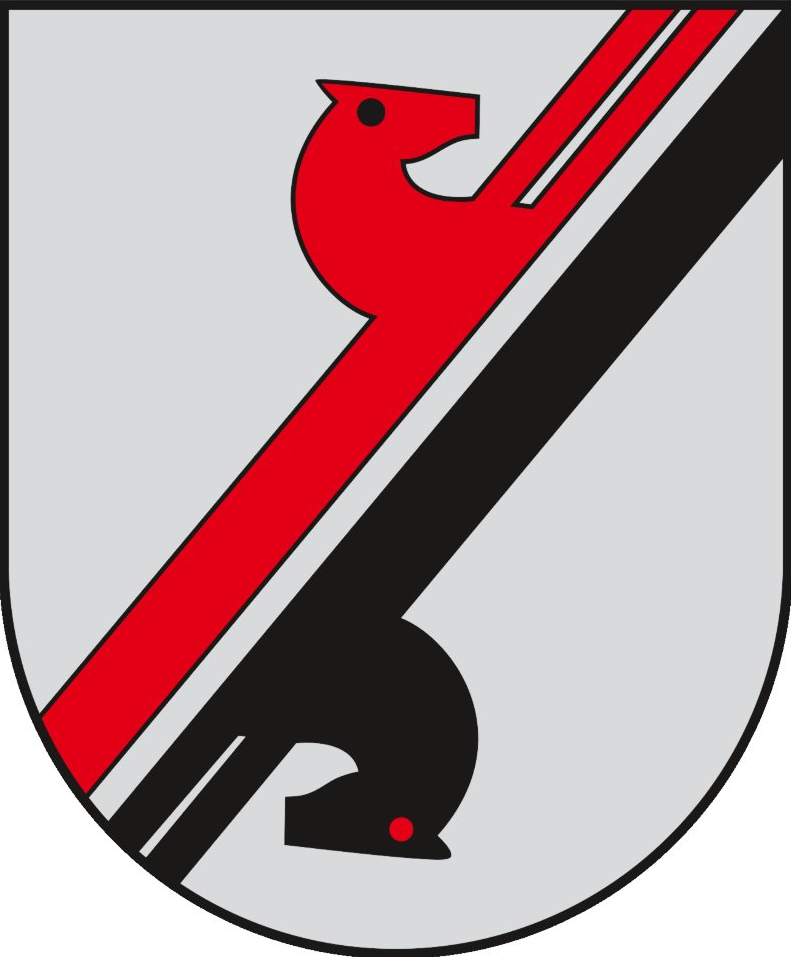
- Coat of arms

- Location of Turmantas
- Coordinates: 55°41′40″N 26°27′40″E
- Country: Lithuania
- Ethnographic region: Aukštaitija
- County: Utena County
- Municipality: Zarasai district municipality
- Eldership: Turmantas eldership
- Capital of: Turmantas eldership
- First mentioned: 1798

Population (2021)
  - Total: 209
- Time zone: UTC+2 (EET)
  - Summer (DST): UTC+3 (EEST)

Turmantas (Polish: Turmont) is a town in the Zarasai district municipality, Lithuania. Located on the border with Latvia, it is a railway station on the Warsaw–Saint Petersburg railway. The village is known since 1798. It began growing after completion of the railway in 1862. As part of the Wilno Voivodeship, Turmantas was part of the Second Polish Republic between 1920 and 1939. During that time a wooden Catholic church was rebuilt, an Orthodox church for the Old Believers and a secondary school were built in the town. According to the 2011 census, it had 286 residents.

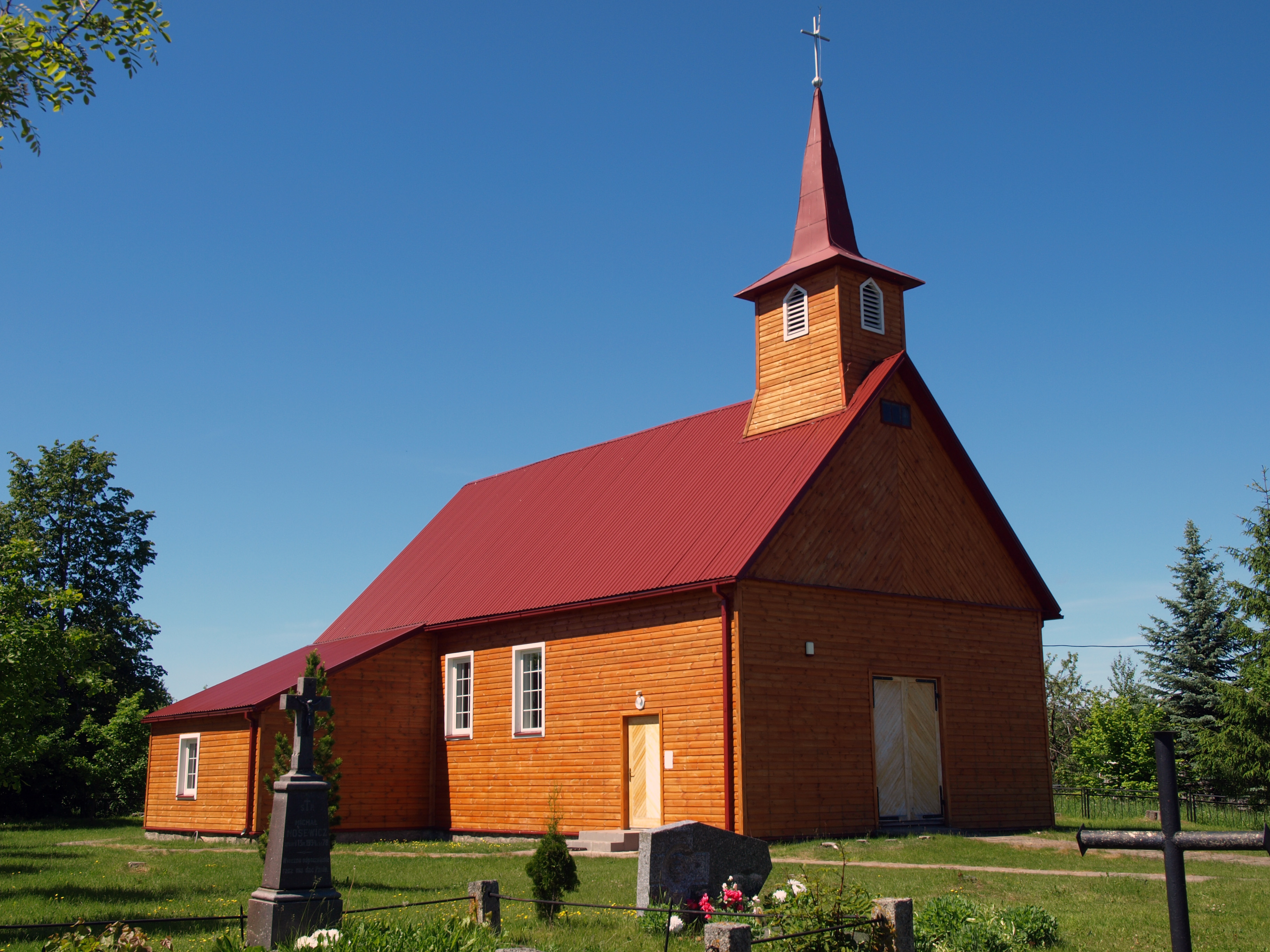
Church of the Sacred Heart of Jesus
