= Kūlupėnai =

Village in Kretinga District Municipality, Lithuania

- Village
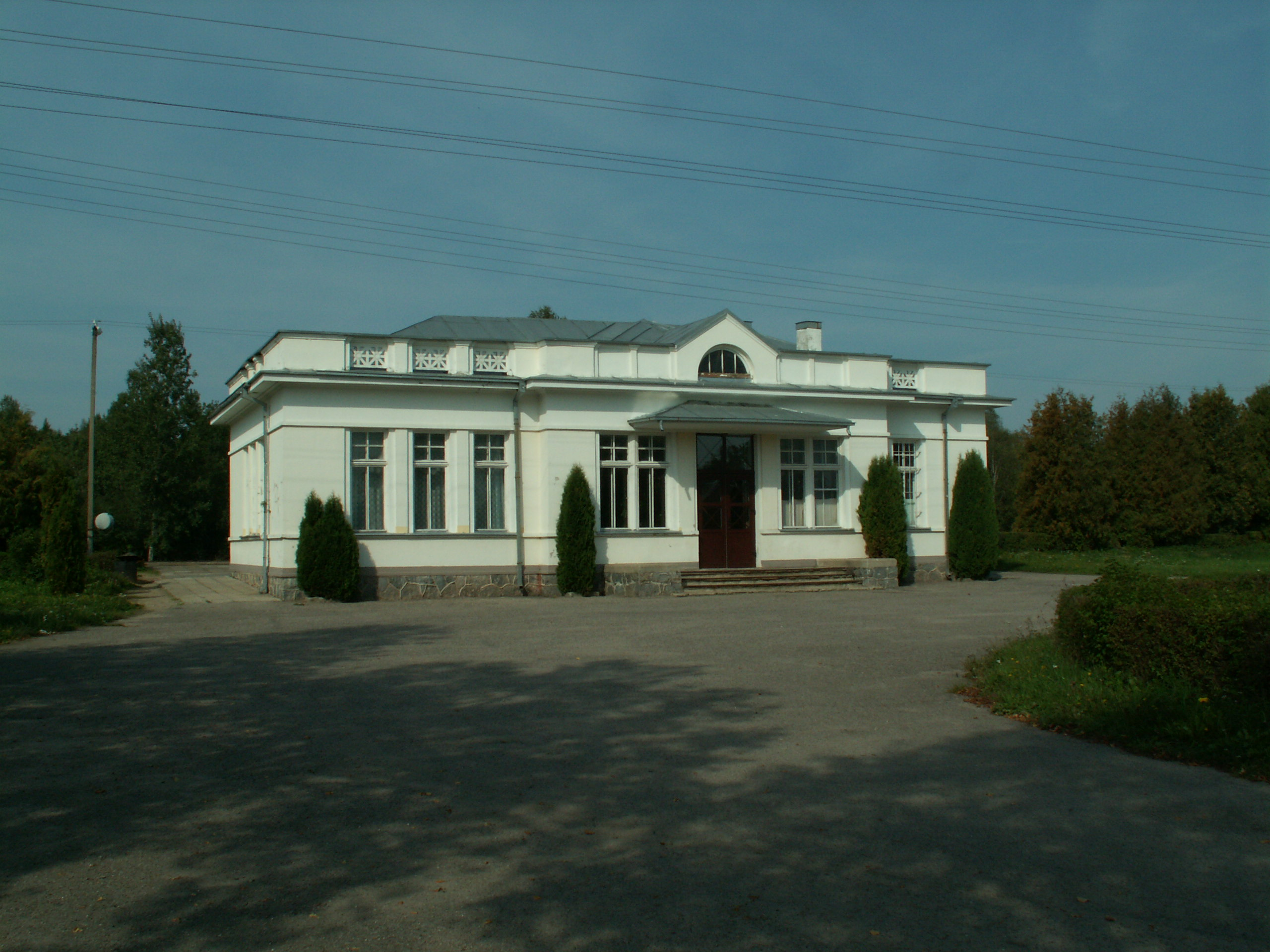
- The Kūlupėnai railway station in 2006
- Interactive map of Kūlupėnai
- Country: Lithuania
- County: Klaipėda County
- District Municipality: Kretinga District Municipality
- Eldership: Kūlupėnai Eldership

Population (2021)
  - Total: 1,035

Kūlupėnai (Note: Samogitian: Kūlopienā) is a village in eastern Kretinga District Municipality, in Klaipėda County, west Lithuania. The KK226 sideroad runs along the northside of the village, connecting Kartena and Salantai.

== Etymology ==
Kūlupėnai was named after the Kūlupis River, flowing along the northern ridge of the village, towards the Salantas River. In the Samogitian language, which is a common language in the Samogitia region, the plural for "stone" is "kūlių", of which the river is named after.

== History ==
=== Medieval and early modern ===
The first mention of Kūlupėnai was in 1566 when the country was deciding on volok divisions (a medieval land unit used in Lithuania equivalent to 21.368 hectares). The village owned 20 voloks (427 hectares) of arable land, which peasants rented from the Plateliai manor. The village was also assigned several pastures, meadows, and forests.

In the 16th–17th centuries, approximately 20 peasant families lived in Kūlupėnai on average at once. Most of these were Roman Catholic farmers who typically attended the Salantai Church of the Assumption of the Blessed Virgin Mary built in 1630 (which was reconstructed in 1911). In 1634, the Kartena Church of the Assumption of the Blessed Virgin Mary was built for the growing population (which was reconstructed in 1881). Many residents from Kūlupėnai were killed during the Great Northern War plague outbreak and laid to rest in their respective graveyards. Only 11 peasant families survived by 1738.

Many of the village's population participated in the November Uprising in 1811. In one battle against soldiers of the Russian Empire in the village of Žarėnai, a peasant named Aloyzas Zubė was killed who was from Kūlupėnai. Several peasants, including Juozas Rupertas, Juozas Jazdauskis, Juozas Šverys, Motiejs Pocias, and Doms Bernotas, were taken in as prisoners.

By the mid-18th century, Kūlupėnai was one of the largest villages in the Kartena rural municipality. Other villages began to merge with each other due to a boom in farming in the area. Before this point, Kūlupėnai didn't have a name, so it was named Kūlupėnai Medsėdžiai in correspondence to the Kūlupėnai forest and another village was named Sausgalviai which was growing closer to Kūlupėnai. By the 19th century, Sausgalviai was merged into Kūlupėnai. By the end of the century, Kūlupėnai belonged to Telšiai County.

=== Soviet ===
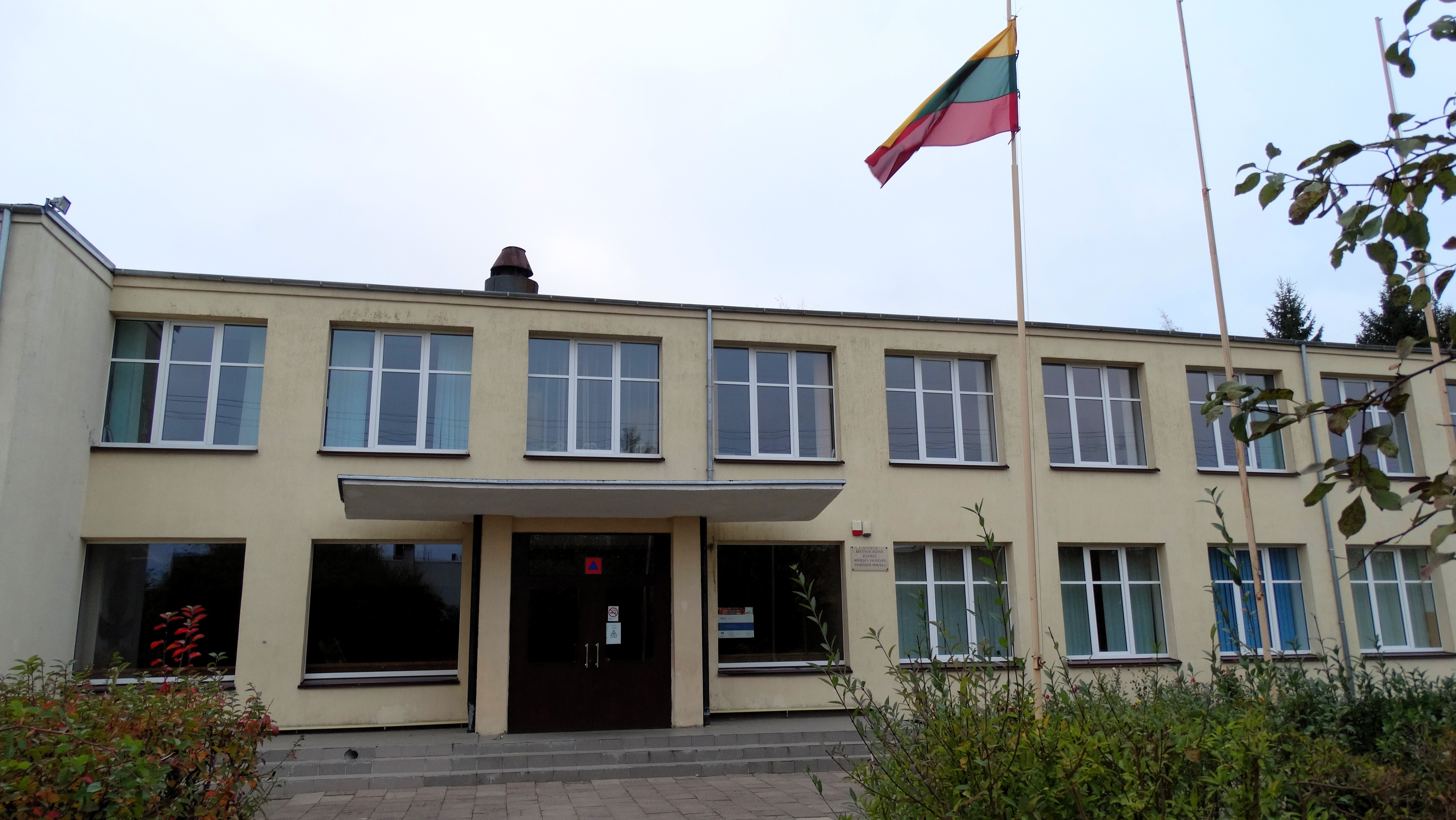
The primary school

In 1904, the Kūlupėnai primary school was opened. In 1923, there were 75 claimed farms in the village, and the population was growing steadily, being close in comparison to the village of Kartena. During the Lithuanian Land Reforms, the farms were divided into single-family ownership, and by this point, only 15 claimed farms were left. The farms left by these farmers are still in use today.

On August 1, 1932, a lightning strike burned down the local barn and stables, which belonged to K. Valužis, a resident of a village in Sausgalviai. Alongside, 50 wagons of clovers, 20 wagons of hay, 3 cows, a foal, a mare, and all of the equipment were lost or destroyed. The residents of Kūlupėnai had a meeting and donated 25 cents per hectare of land the village owned into a local treasury.

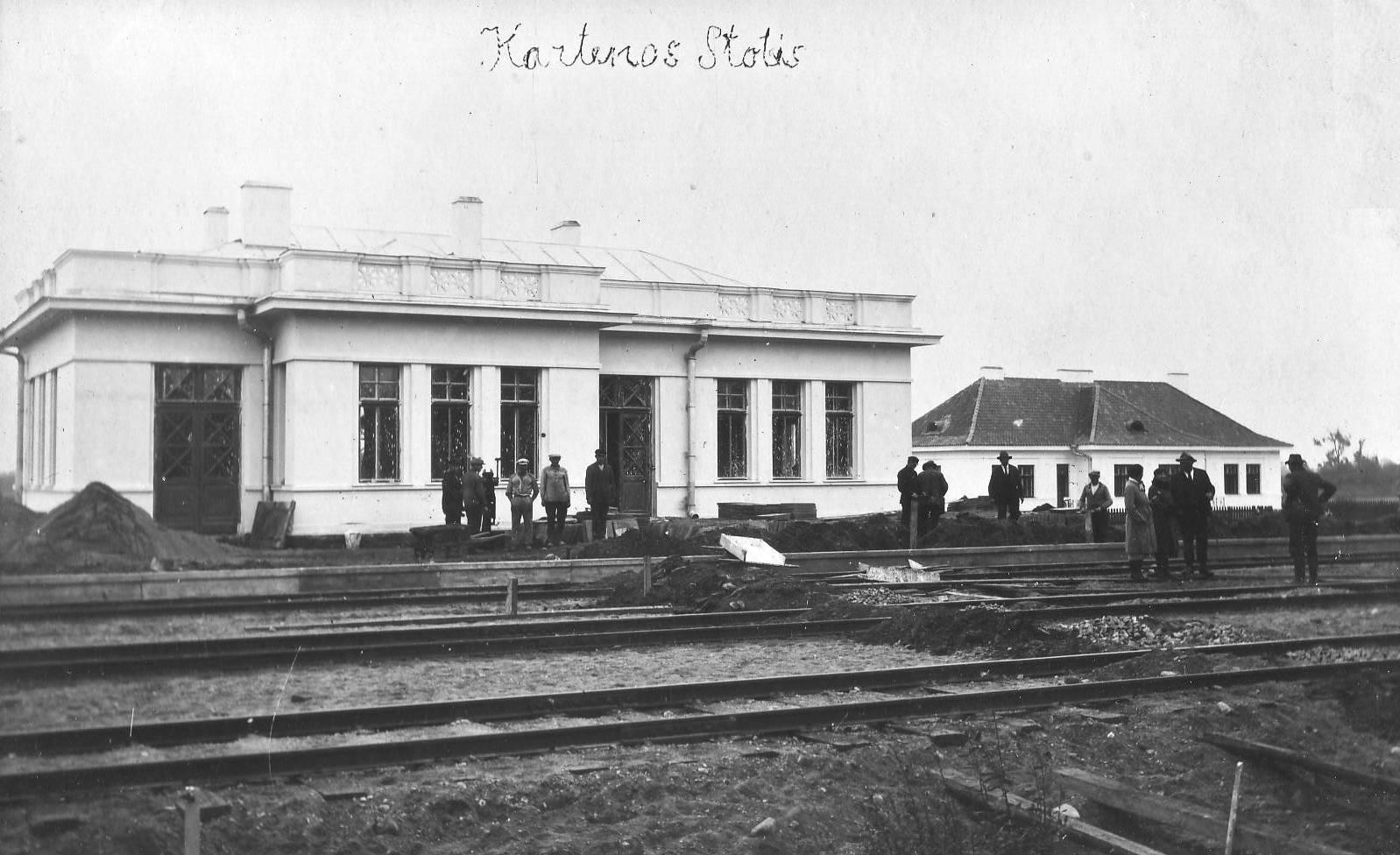
The construction of the railway station and its line

During the interwar period, Kūlupėnai became an economically important settlement in the historical Kretinga County. In 1931–1932, the Kūlupėnai railway station was constructed, becoming the largest railway line in the Samogitian region and linking transport over the Salantas River. The Kretinga Consumers' Association, a cooperative trade company, established itself near the railway station. In 1940, the Lithuanian Cooperative Union founded the "Kartena flax processing factory" on the outskirts of the village of Linas and constructed barracks for the workers.

Juozas Sabulis, the train master of the railway station, was deported to Siberia on June 14, 1941. In 1948–1950, residents of the village were deported to Siberia under the Soviet Union during the Soviet Occupation of the Baltic states.

In 1945, a communications department was constructed for the operation of the railway station. In 1947, a 220 kW power plant was constructed near the settlement to provide electricity for the village. In 1949, the primary school reopened as a seven-year school, then later an eight-year school in 1953. A midwifery station was built in 1957, and a cultural center, in 1960.

Several residents of the village joined the Lithuanian partisans. Among them were Steponas Motiejauskas-Tamošius, who joined the Bugantas company in 1948 and died in 1950. About 20 families were deported to labour camps in Russia by the NKVD and the extermination battalion between 1945 and 1952. A peasant named Domas Latakas was executed for receiving land that had been seized from farmers. A collective farm was established in 1949, later reorganized into the Kūlupėnai Soviet farm in the 1970s.

=== Post-Soviet ===
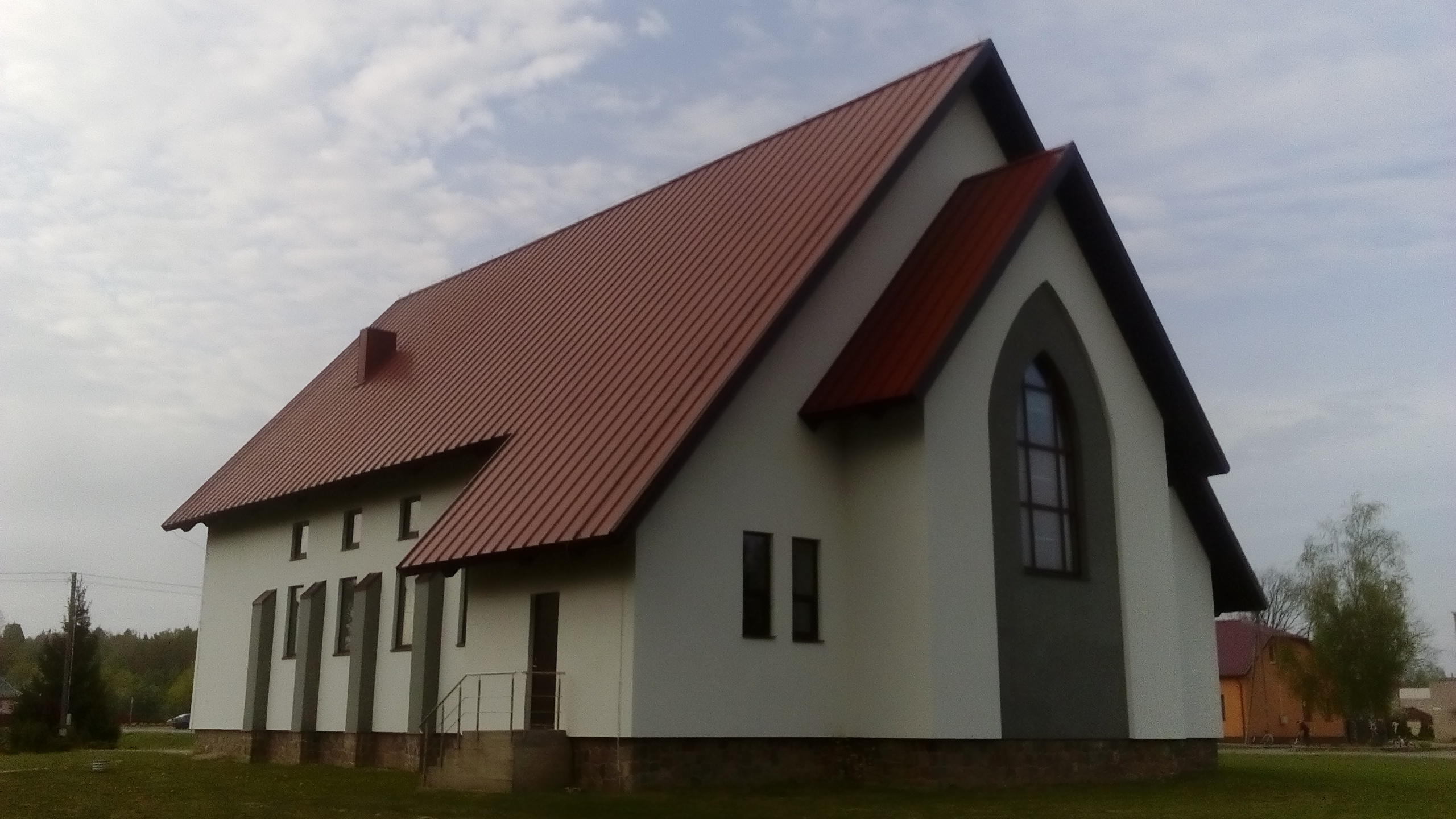
The Kūlupėnai Church of St. Matthew

In 1994, the Kūlupėnai Catholic Prayer House was established, and in 2014, the Kūlupėnai Church of St. Matthew was opened.

In 2003, the school partook in a renovation program which redesigned the school by 2005, adding murals across the building's interior. Between 2015 and 2017, the school was implemented into a national program called the Ersasmus+ Project, which allowed students to learn about European culture and new languages, including Russian and English. A music program was also started in 2019.

In 2010, as the population of the village slowly increased, a pre-school was established named "Boružėlės".

== Heritage sites ==
- Kūlupėnai old cemetery, locally called the Markapiai (fl. 16th–19th centuries)
- Kūlupėnai partisans monument, dedicated to those who died in 1953 (constructed in 1999)
- Chapel of the Virgin Mary and two angels (constructed in 20th century)
- Chapel with the Crucifix, John of Nepomuk, and the Virgin Mary (constructed in 20th century)
- Kūlupėnai railway bridge (constructed in 1931–1932)
- Kūlupėnai railway station (constructed in 1931–1932)
