= Kūlupėnai railway station =

Train station in Lithuania

Kūlupėnai railway station Kūlupėnų geležinkelio stotis
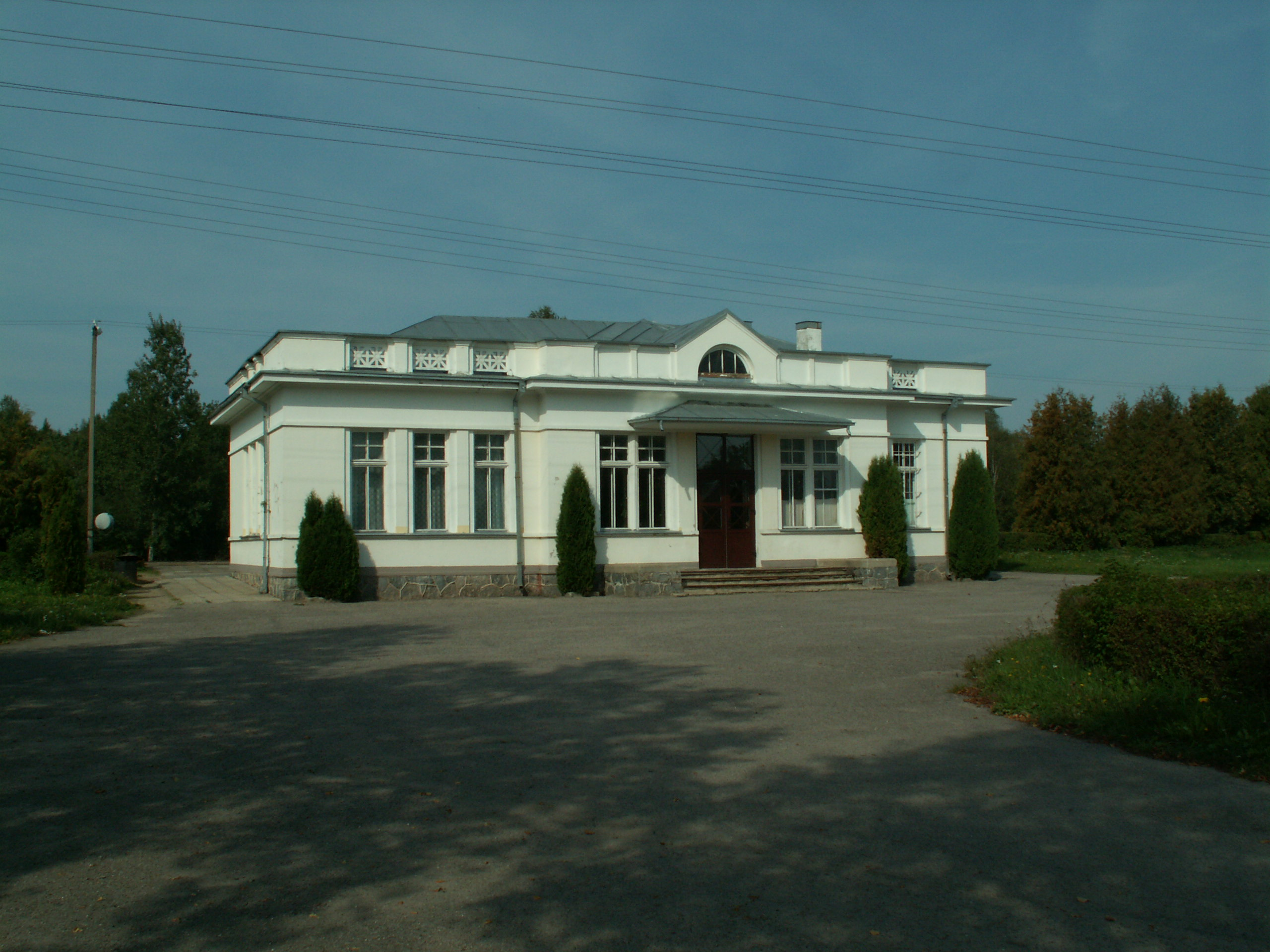
- The station in 2006

General information
- Other names: Kartena railway station
- Location: Stoties g. 9 Klaipėda County; Lithuania
- Operated by: Lithuanian Railways
- Platforms: 1

History
- Opened: October 29, 1932
Location

The Kūlupėnai railway station, (Note: Lithuanian: Kūlupėnų geležinkelio stotis) formerly the Kartena railway station between 1932–1975, (Note: Lithuanian: Kartenos geležinkelio stotis) is a train station in the village of Kūlupėnai, Lithuania. It's operated and owned by the state-owned Lithuanian Railways. It's a midpoint between the Radviliškis–Klaipėda and Kretinga–Šateikiai lines.

== History ==
=== Pre-Soviet ===
The railway station was constructed during the development of the Plungė railway station in the northwest of the country, as part of a development of the railway network between Greater Lithuania and the Klaipėda Region. The development of this line was more difficult, however, as the river Minija was situated between Plungė and Kūlupėnai, requiring more resources and time to construct the line. Initially, the plan was to construct the line running alongside the Tinteliai village.

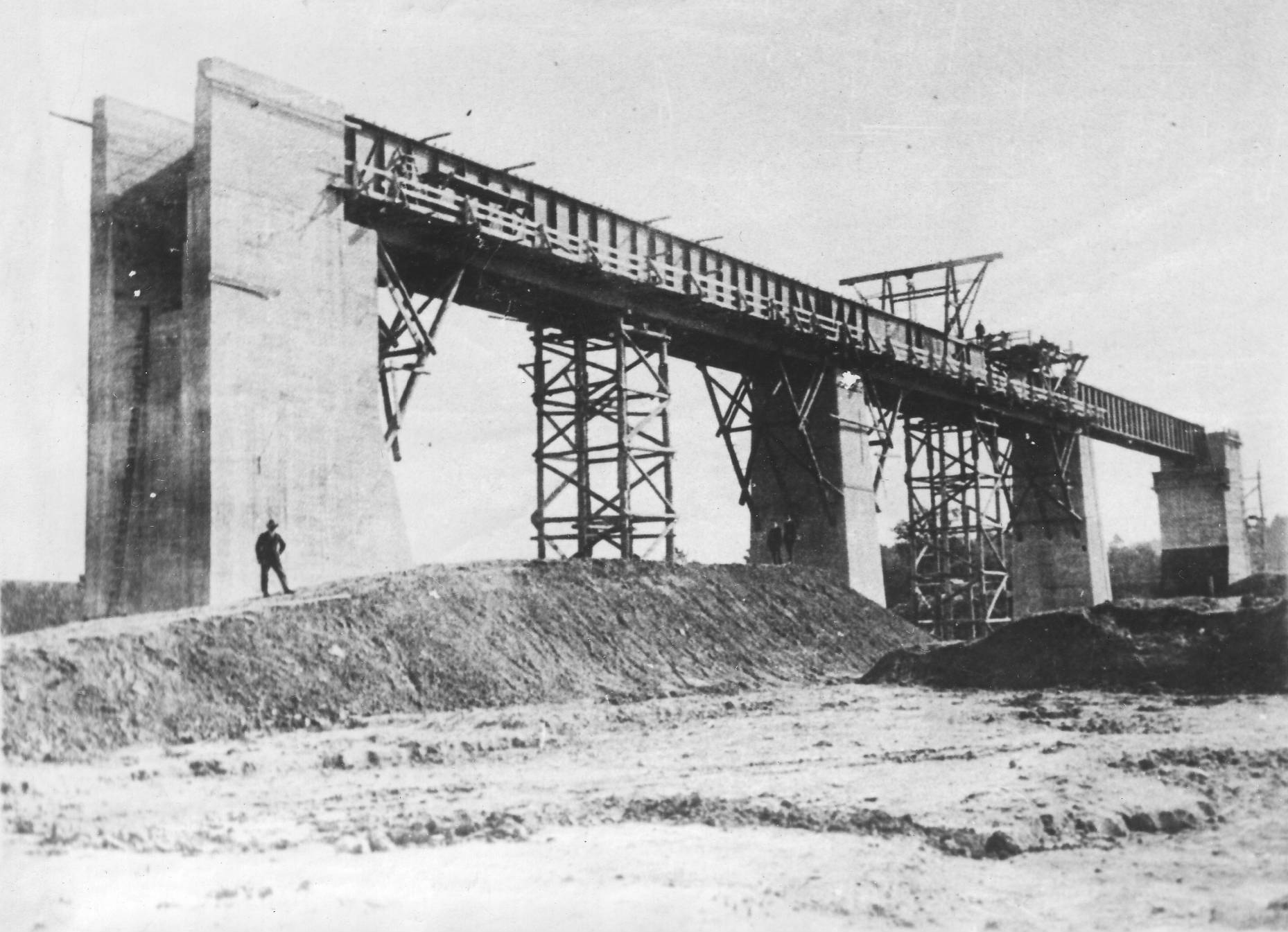
Construction of the bridge crossing the river in 1931

Construction officially started in 1927, with it being decided that the line would be constructed running alongside Kūlupėnai and would be named the Kartena railway line. In 1928, farmers and workers were moved from Utena County into Kūlupėnai and neighbouring villages. Construction materials were mostly transported utilising horses and carts, which was also useful for constructing the bridge which would cross the Minija. Construction was stalled in 1929 due to financial issues, but work resumed the next year.

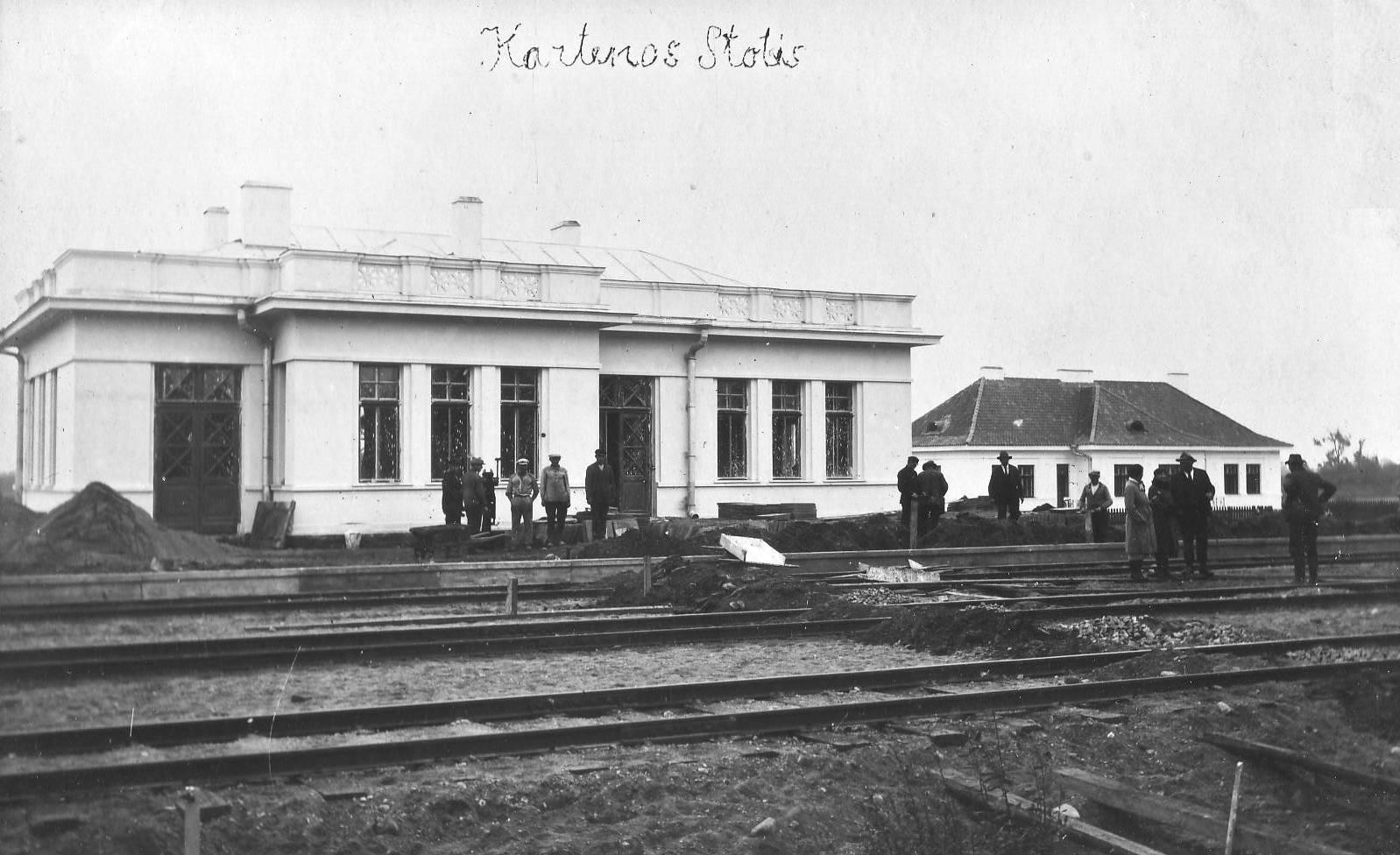
Construction of the line and station in 1932

In autumn 1931, the line to Kūlupėnai was constructed, with freight trains often carrying materials and workers across the county. By March 1932, the embankment and most of the station was complete. On August 20, 1932, part of the embankment collapsed. The solution was to fill it with frozen marshland that same autumn.

The railway station and line connecting it were officially constructed in 1932. The construction of the station was carried out by Danish company MT Højgaard. It was officially named Kartena railway station, after the town of Kartena, at the time and opened on 29 October 1932 during the opening ceremony of the Kužiai–Kretinga line. The ceremony was attended by Lithuanian President Antanas Smetona and other various ministers and leaders of public organizations.

=== Soviet ===
In 1948–1950, residents of the village were deported to Siberia under the Soviet Union during the Soviet Occupation of the Baltic states. Residents of the Kretinga District Municipality and the newly created Salantai District were deported using this station. Kūlupėnai grew larger and closer to the railway as a result of Soviet residents moving in. The station was then renamed to the Kūlupėnai railway station by Pranas Daukantas, a long-time station master of the Kūlupėnai station, in 1975 to associate the station better to its closest settlement. Thereafter, it was renovated.

=== Post-Soviet and modern ===
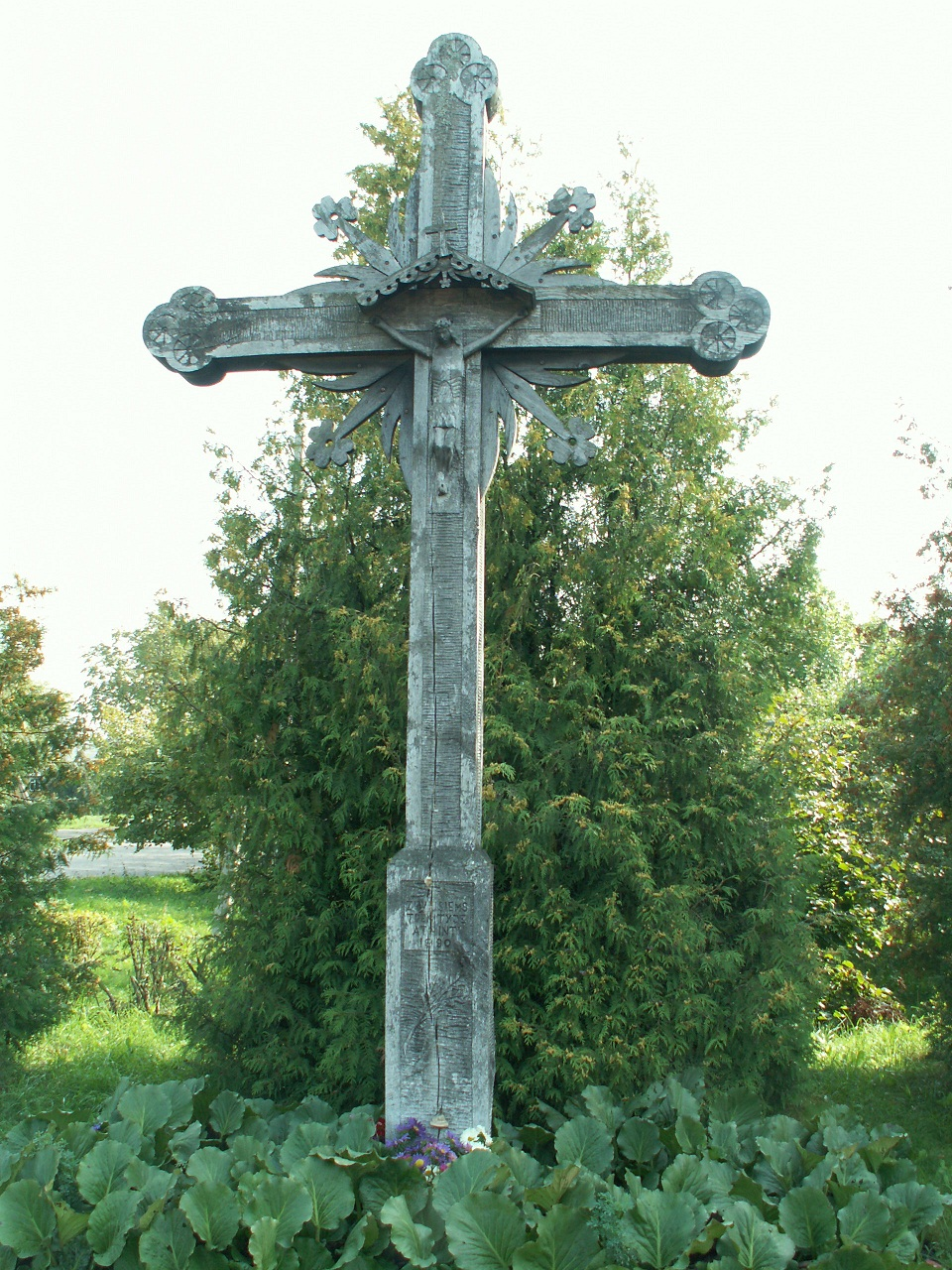
The memorial in 2006

A memorial of a cross was erected at the station on June 14, 1990, by Zigmas Krakauskas to commemorate the deportees sent to Siberia. It was named the Deportees' Cross. However, some historians describe it earlier in 1989. Since then, it has been removed and replaced with another cross by Lithuanian folk artist Liudas Šopauskas, bearing a newer style. It was erected on June 14, 2015 and has been placed under Lithuanian Railways, whilst the cross itself has been looked after by an elder named Kūlupėnai Rita Lubienė.

== Architecture ==
The single-story station building itself is made of plastered masonry. There is a passenger waiting room, ticket office, and administration office inside. The composition of the building is asymmetrical. Like with many other train station renovations during the 1990s in Lithuania, the roof was replaced with tin with new support beams.

The renovation of the station was done in a single project alongside three other stations:

- Kupiškis railway station
- Skapiškis railway station
- Panemunėlis railway station
