= Kartena Hillfort =

Fort in Lithuania

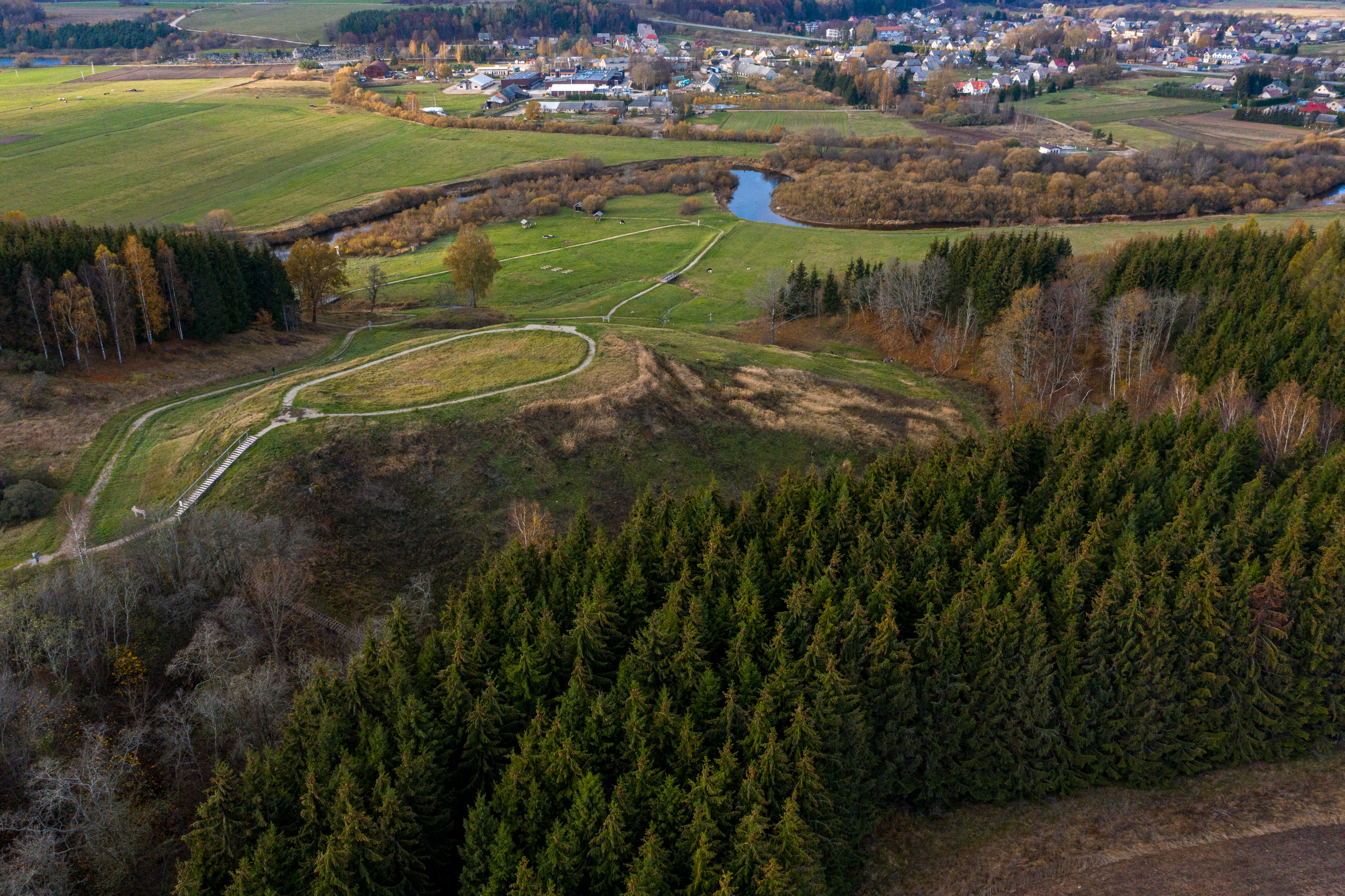
- Interactive map of the Kartena Hillfort area

General information
- Location: Kartena, Lithuania
- Coordinates: 55.910278°N 21.475667°E

Website
- www.

Kartena Hillfort, also called the Castle, Swede or Lūžtis Mountain, is located on the other side of the river from Kartena Town in Lithuania. The town, as well as a bend in the Minija River and the surrounding valleys are visible from the hillfort. The hillfort has been dated to the 8th to 13th centuries, while the wooden castle that once stood there was a defensive and administrative centre for the Curonians of the Ceclis lands. In the written records, Kartena is mentioned for the first time as early as 1253.

== History ==
Legend states that the hillfort was named Kartena after a time when a castle belonging to the Samogitian King that stood there was attacked in a battle between the Swedish and Russian armies. The Samogitian leader, who watched the battle break out in the valley from the towers of the castle, shouted out to his subordinates: “Watch out, the war is there!” (in Lithuanian “Veizėkiet, karė tenā!”). It is because of these words that the name Kartena came about. In 2012, with financing from EU structural funds, the hillfort and its surroundings were tidied up and adapted for visitors. The hillfort, Witch's Stone and the Lourdes Grotto replica are connected by a circular overview trail, with a total length of 2.8 kilometres.

== Gallery ==
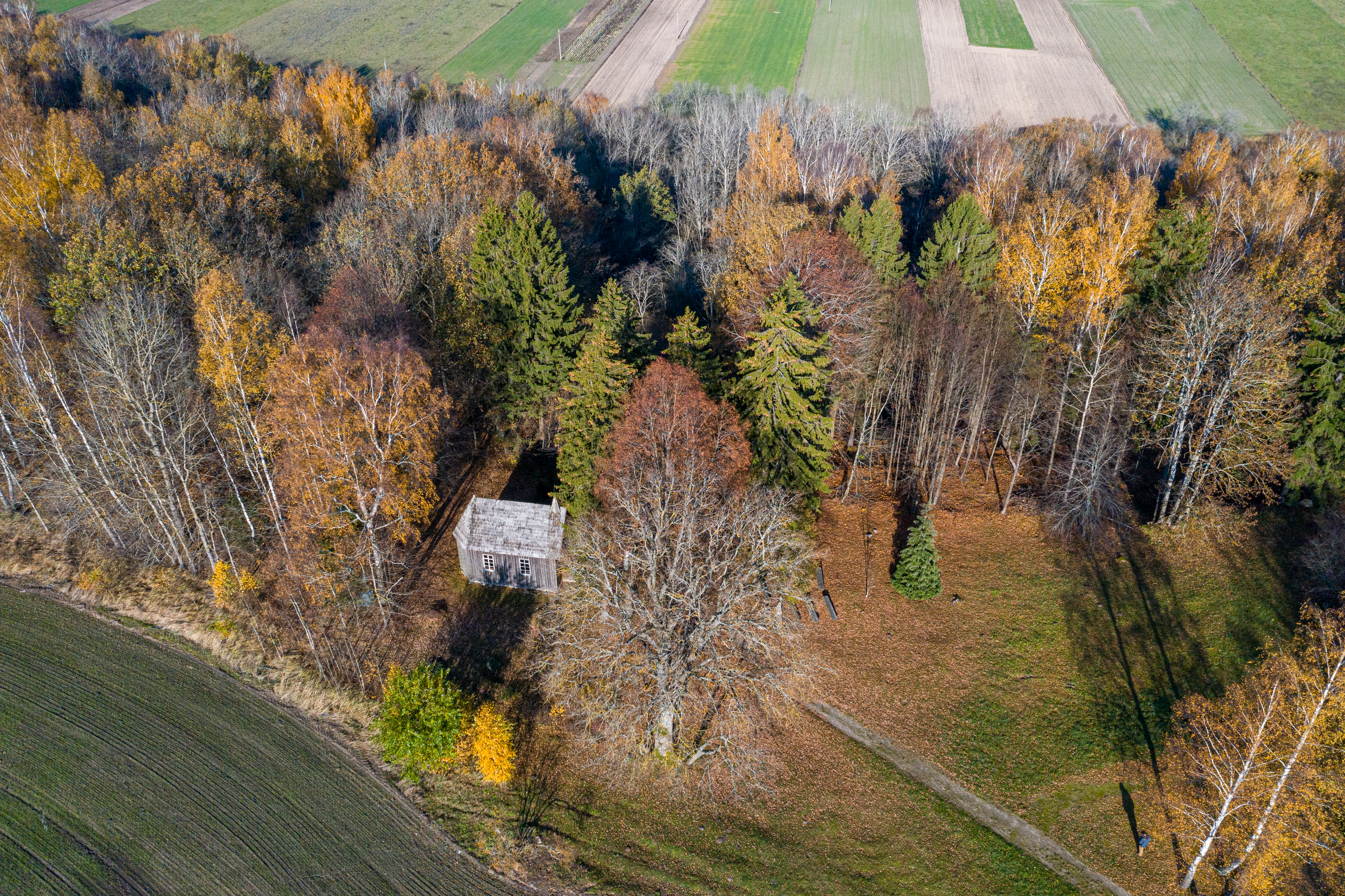

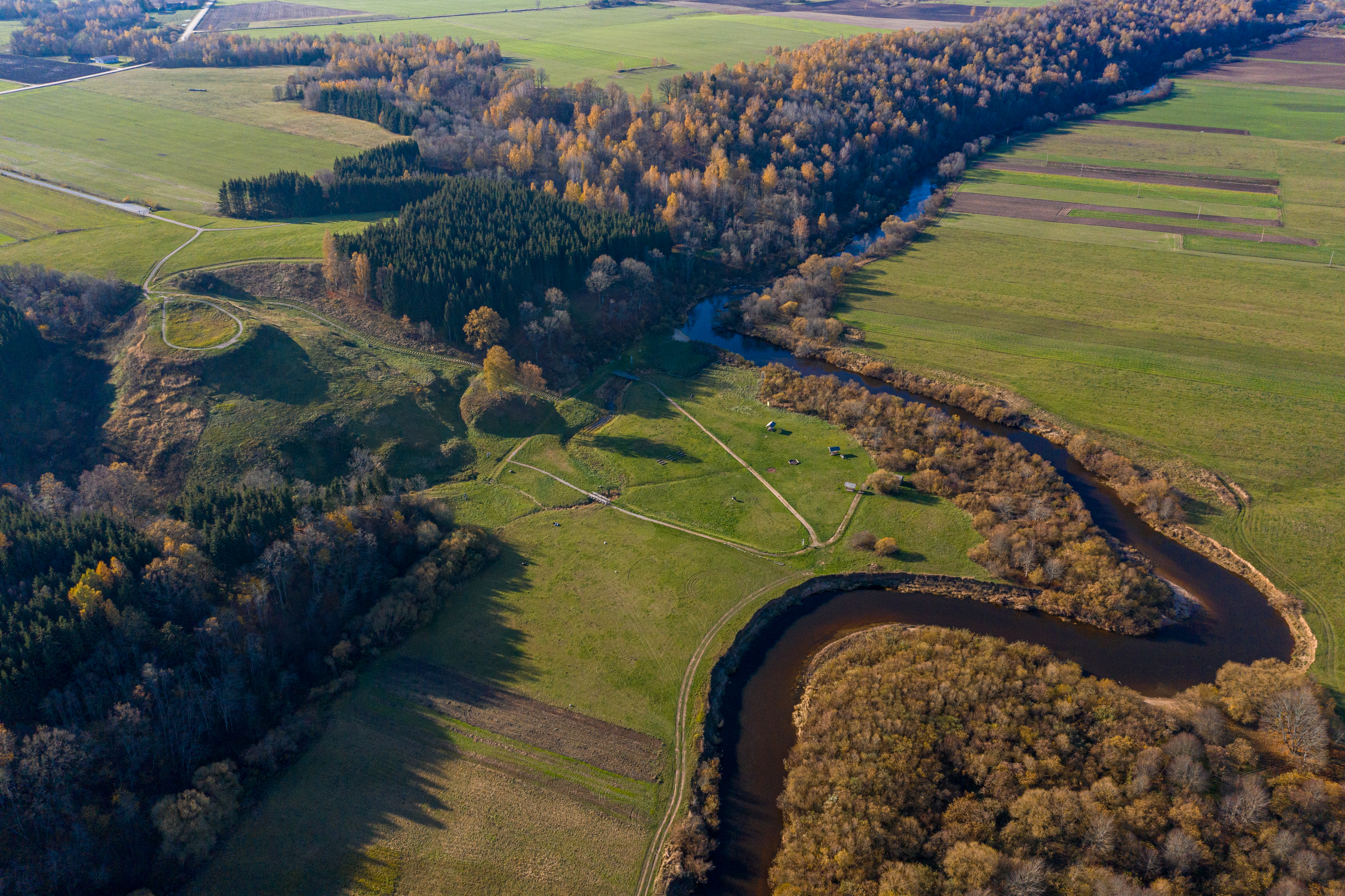

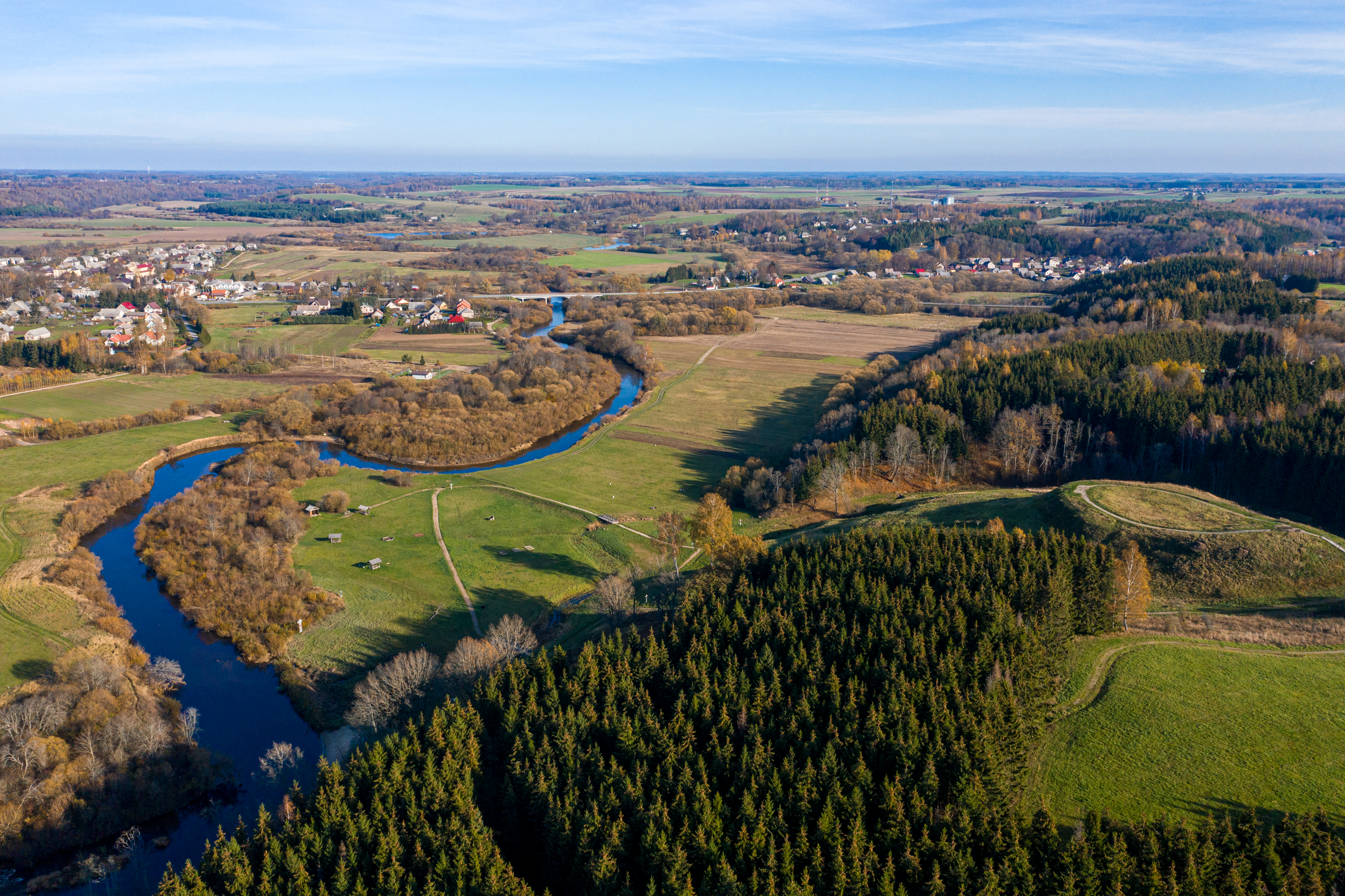

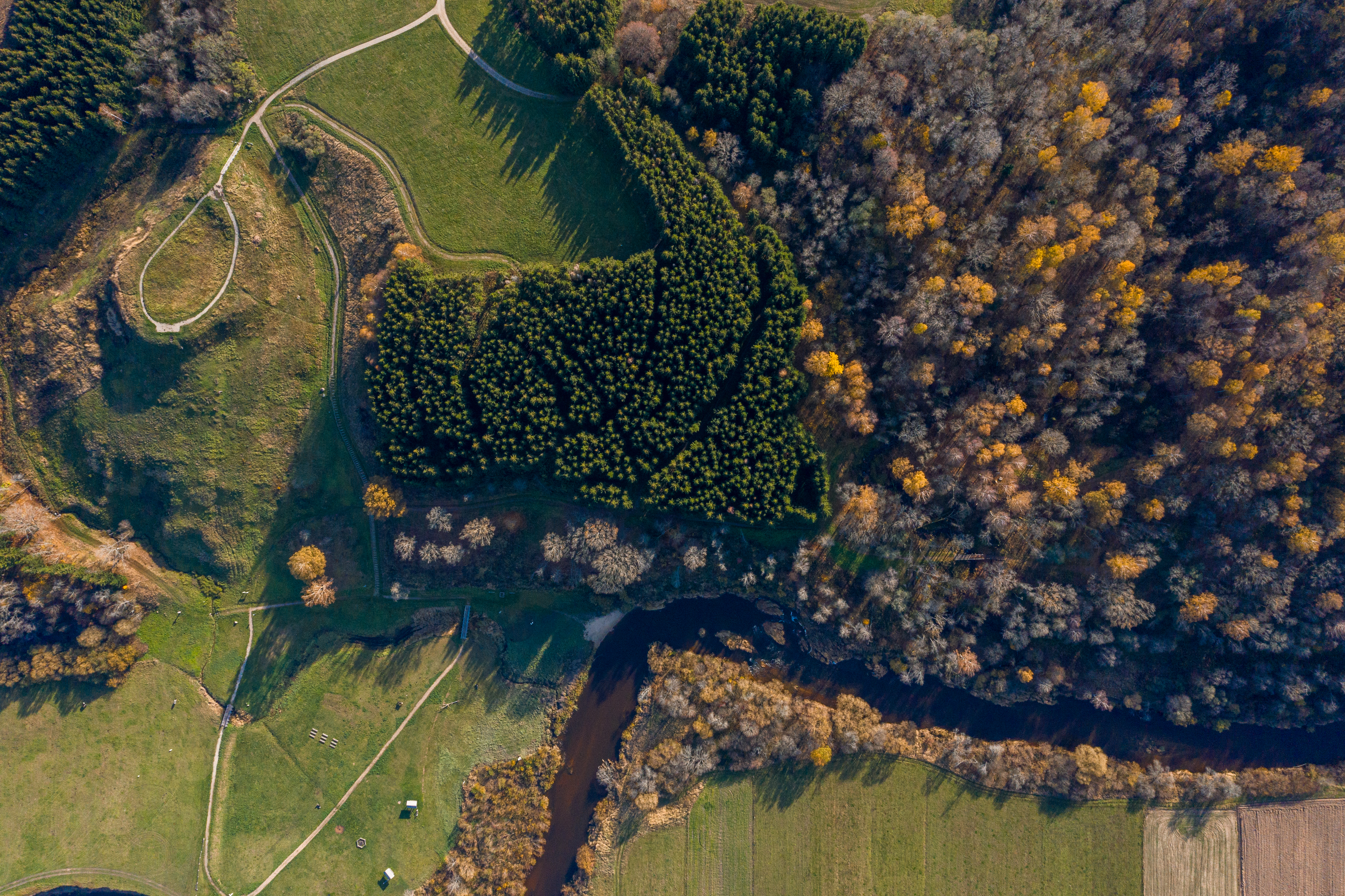
