= Plungė railway station =

Train station in Lithuania

Plungė railway station Plungės geležinkelio stotis
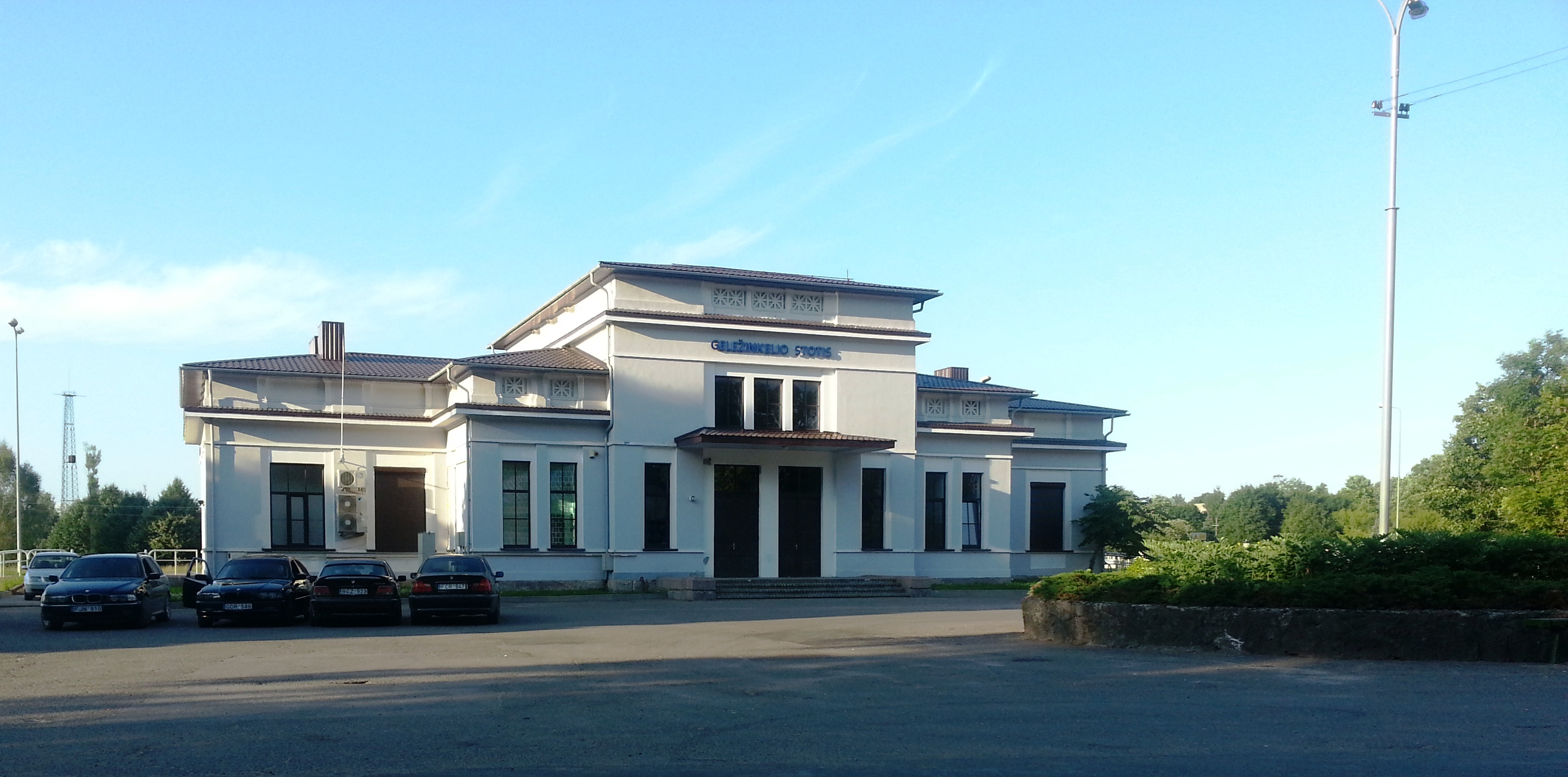
- The station in 2013

General information
- Location: Stoties g. 29; Plungė District Municipality; Lithuania
- Operated by: Lithuanian Railways
- Platforms: 2

Construction
- Architect: Vincas Pukas
- Architectural style: Modern, neoclassical

History
- Opened: October 29, 1932
Location

The Plungė railway station (Note: Lithuanian: Plungės geležinkelio stotis; Polish: Płungiany stacja kolejowa; Samogitian: Plongė gelžkėlė stuotės) is a train station in the city of Plungė, northwestern Lithuania. It's operated and owned by the state-owned Lithuanian Railways. The train station is a major public line to Vilnius–Klaipėda and Radviliškis–Klaipėda.

== History ==
=== Pre-Soviet ===
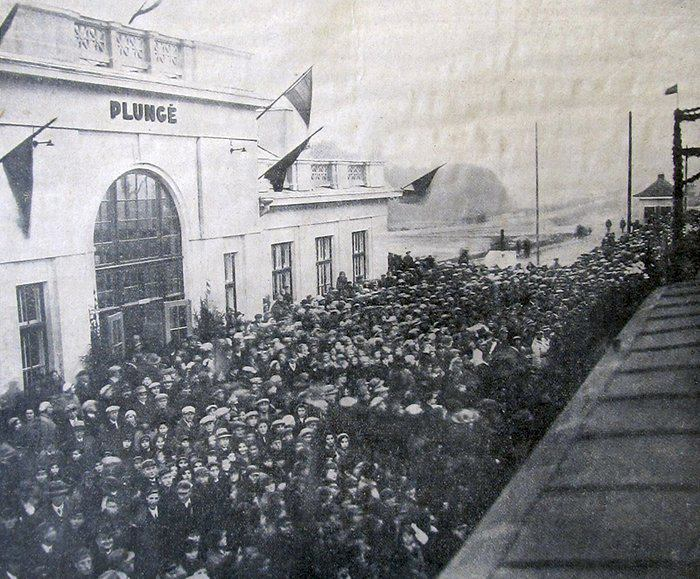
Grand opening of the station in 1932

The station was opened as part of a development of the railway network between Greater Lithuania and the Klaipėda Region. Construction of the Telšiai–Kretinga line began in 1930, and five new railway stations were built on this new section, with the last one being the Plungė railway station:

- Kūlupėnai railway station
- Šateikiai railway station
- Lieplaukė railway station
- Telšiai railway station

The construction of the line allowed the merchants and businessowners of Plungė to move imports and exports faster, especially cotton and flax. The station officially opened on October 29, 1932 at 13:00, with Lithuanian President Antanas Smetona arriving by train at the station for the grand opening ceremony. The line and the station were consecrated by the Bishop of Telšiai, Justinas Staugaitis.

=== Soviet ===
After the Soviet Union had captured the city during the Soviet Occupation of the Baltic states, residents of the city and surrounding areas were deported to Soviet camps using the line. The station then became an important military transport zone; from 1960–1978, two underground thermonuclear missile launch base was opened in the Šateikiai and Plokštinė forests. The construction materials required for the project were transported using the line, alongside the Šateikiai railway station.

=== Post-Soviet and modern ===
On June 14, 1991, a memorial plaque for the deportees to the Soviet camps during Soviet occupation was unveiled.

In 2018–2019, a tunnel viaduct (an underground tunnel for vehicles and trains) was installed at the intersections of Dariaus and Girėno streets in Plungė with the railway station section. The tunnel's height is 4.5 m and is 57 m long, with a width of 8 m for a two-lane road with a pedestrian sidewalk and bicycle path. An additional 270 m of road and line had to be constructed to accommodate the tunnel. The entire project cost €5 million.

In 2021–2022, a reconstruction project integrated another railway line and a bus station, which was officially opened on February 25, 2022.

In 2025, the station complex was included in the cultural heritage register (No. 49289).

Today, the line is a major operator between Vilnius–Klaipėda and Radviliškis–Klaipėda.

== Architecture ==
The station complex has a number of registered cultural heritage sites, including the station building (No. 49290), the railway workers' house (No. 48291), and the Lietūkis warehouse (No. 49292). The station and railway line are known for being some of the best preserved during World War II.

A passenger house was assembled in 1937 on the station territory alongside a water tower and workers' houses. They still remain intact.

The construction of the station was carried out by Danish company MT Højgaard in 1930. However, a fire in Plungė in 1931 halted construction for a short period of time. In order to save money and to connect the region by train as quickly as possible, Plungė station was built in the same way as the Telšiai railway station – plastered masonry, covered with a tin roof. Kartena station is similarly constructed, only asymmetrically. The roof was later reconstructed.
