= Church of the Assumption of the Blessed Virgin Mary, Salantai =

Roman Catholic church in Salantai, Lithuania

Salantai Church of the Assumption of the Blessed Virgin Mary
- Salantų Švč. Mergelės Marijos Ėmimo į dangų bažnyčia
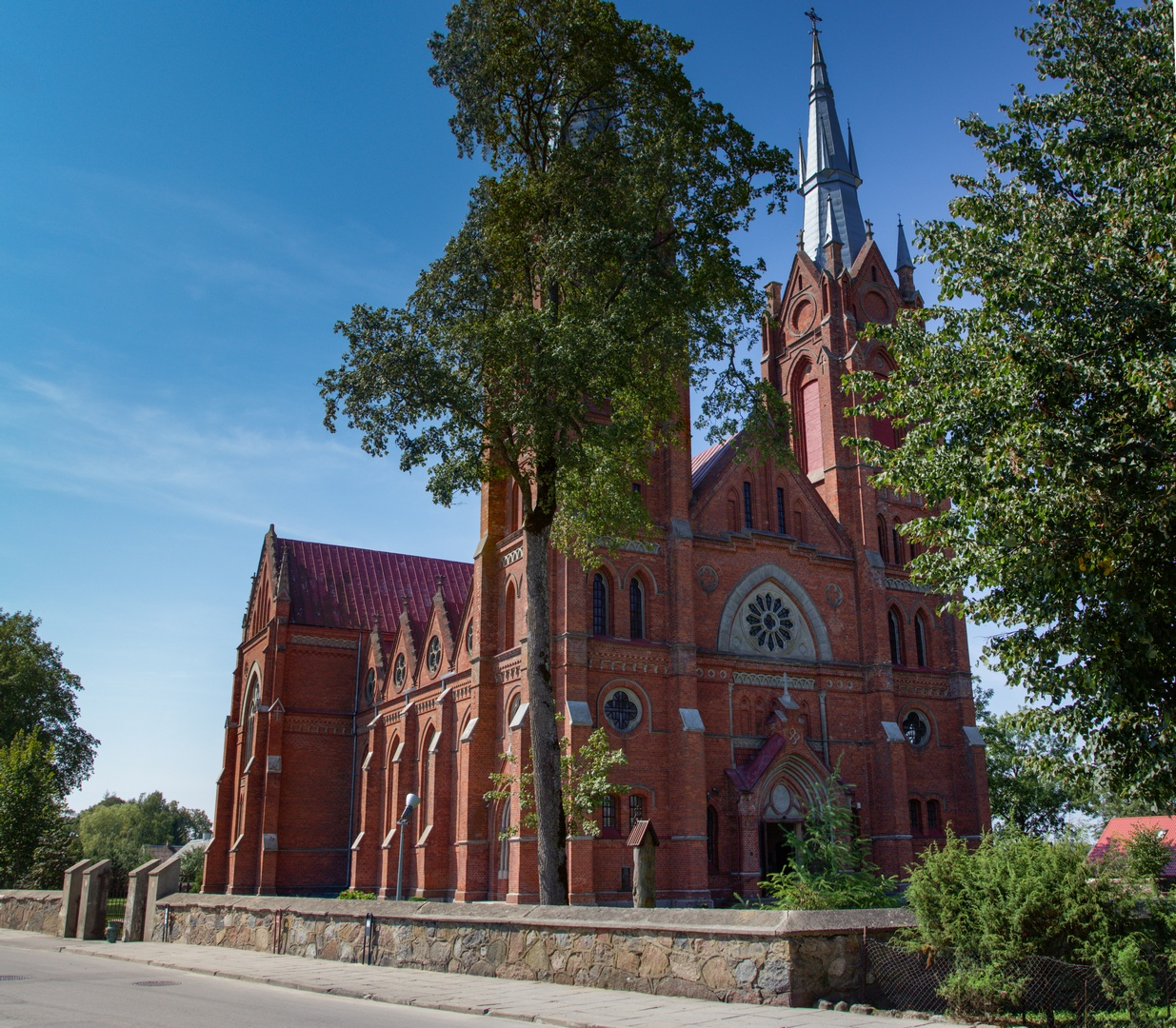
- The church in 2013

- Location within Lithuania
- 56.0587°N 21.5691°E
- Address: S. Dariaus street / S. Girėno street 10
- Country: Lithuania
- Denomination: Roman Catholic

Architecture
- Style: Neo-Gothic

Specifications
- Materials: Brick, marble

Administration
- Archdiocese: Roman Catholic Archdiocese of Kaunas
- Diocese: Diocese of Telšiai
- Deanery: Deanery of Palanga

Clergy
- Pastor: Rolandas Karpavičius (since 2025)

The Salantai Church of the Assumption of the Blessed Virgin Mary (Note: Lithuanian: Salantų Švč. Mergelės Marijos Ėmimo į dangų bažnyčia) is a Roman Catholic church in the town of Salantai, Lithuania. It is run and owned by the Deanery of Palanga.

== History ==
=== Precursor to the church ===
Before the construction of the Salantai Church, the governor of Salantai and horseman of Sigismund III Vasa, Mikalojus Pasamovskis, founded a small church in the village of Skilandžiai. In 1603, Bishop Merkelis Giedraitis consecrated the church under the town of Mosėdis.

=== Construction of the church ===
In 1630, Pasamovskis wished to construct a larger church in Salantai under the name of "Assumption of the Blessed Virgin Mary". He hoped to influence peasants in the region to convert to Catholicism after a large number converted to Protestantism during the Reformation. The church was constructed in 1631 with Bishop Merkelis Eliaševičius Geišas consecrating it.

=== Reconstructions ===
By 1724, the church fell into disrepair and a new one was constructed in its place by landowner Vladislovas Vaina and Kazimieras Dominykas Oginskis. It was consecrated in 1750 by Bishop Antanas Tiškevičius. In documents, it was described as having a large wooden nave with a Renaissance-style multi-tiered tower and a five-walled apse in Gothic style. Inside was a large organ, several bells, and displayed church vestments. From the ceiling hung a crystal chandelier. A marble memorial of Vaina was placed in front of the altar after he died in 1649. The church had a catacomb where some of the priests were buried.

The church was again repaired in 1848. New altars were constructed in 1860. In 1902, architect Karlas Edvardas Strandmanas proposed another reconstruction project to replace most of the old wooden nave with brick. In 1903, pastor A. Neverdauskas began collecting donations for this reconstruction, buying stones for the foundations. In 1906, the old wooden nave was demolished and reconstruction began. In 1911, the reconstruction project was complete. The church's ownership was given to the Deanery of Skuodas.

== Architecture ==
The church follows a neo-Gothic style. It contains three naves with a transept and an apse. Two towers topped with spires protrude above the transept. Neo-Gothic benches decorate the inside auditoriums and wooden altars dedicated to historical members of the parish.

A 17th-century painting of the Virgin Mary with baby Jesus is depicted inside. Another painting titled the Holy Virgin Mary of Sorrows sits inside the transept, made in the 19th century.

== Gallery ==
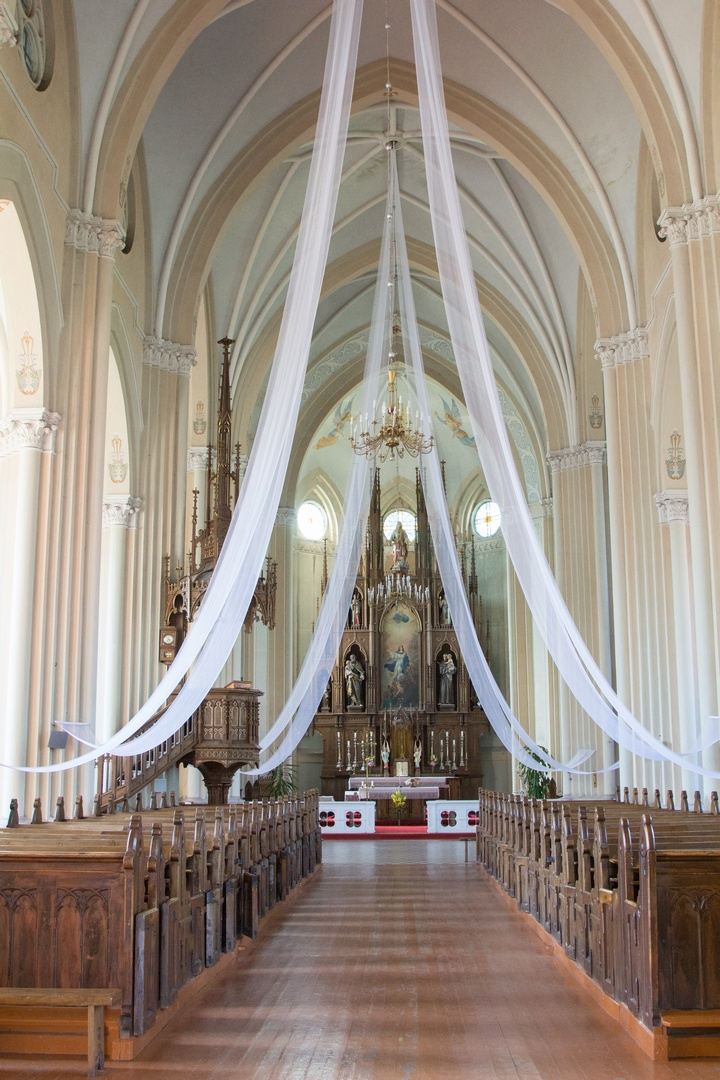
Church inside

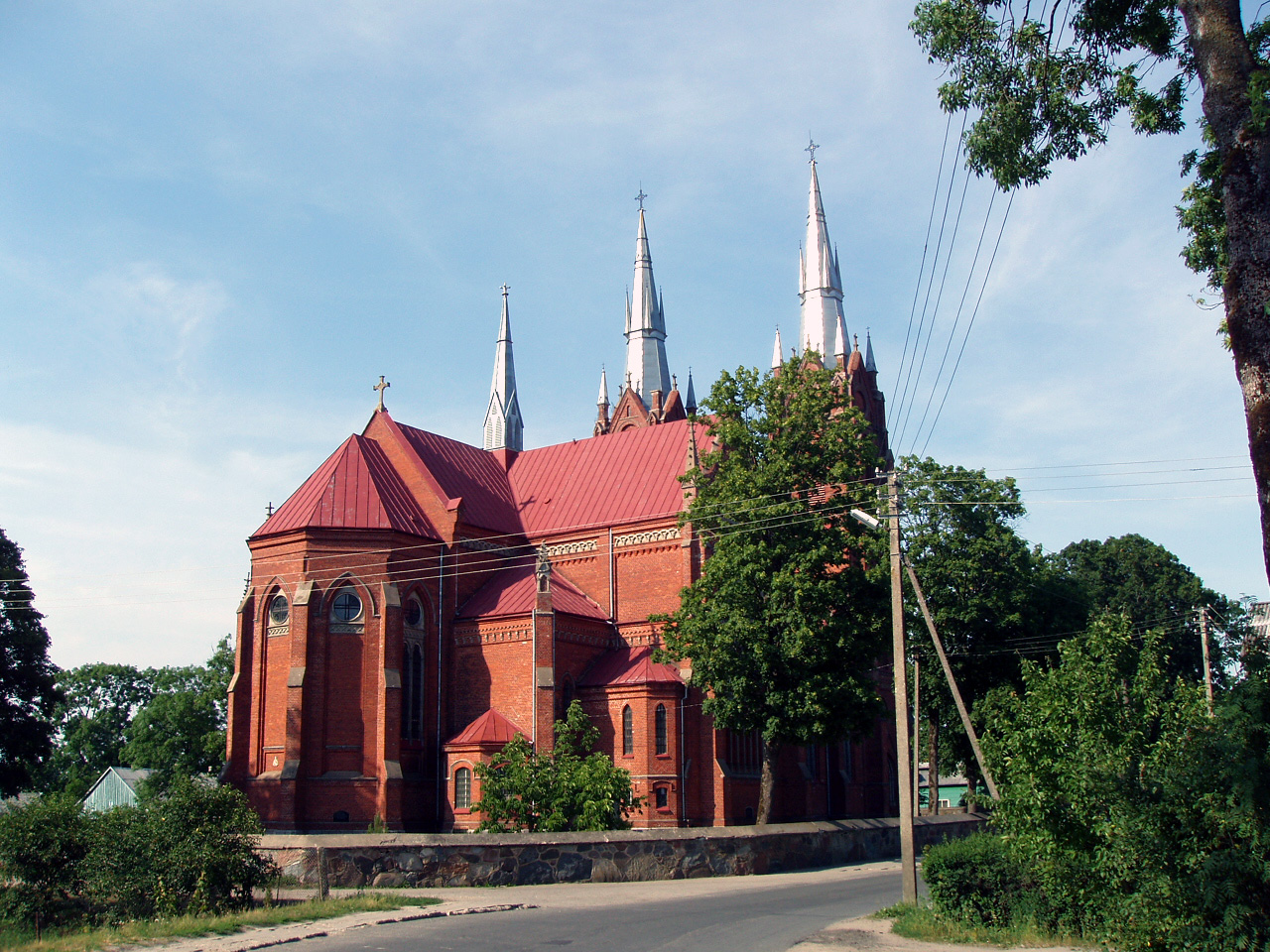
View from the south

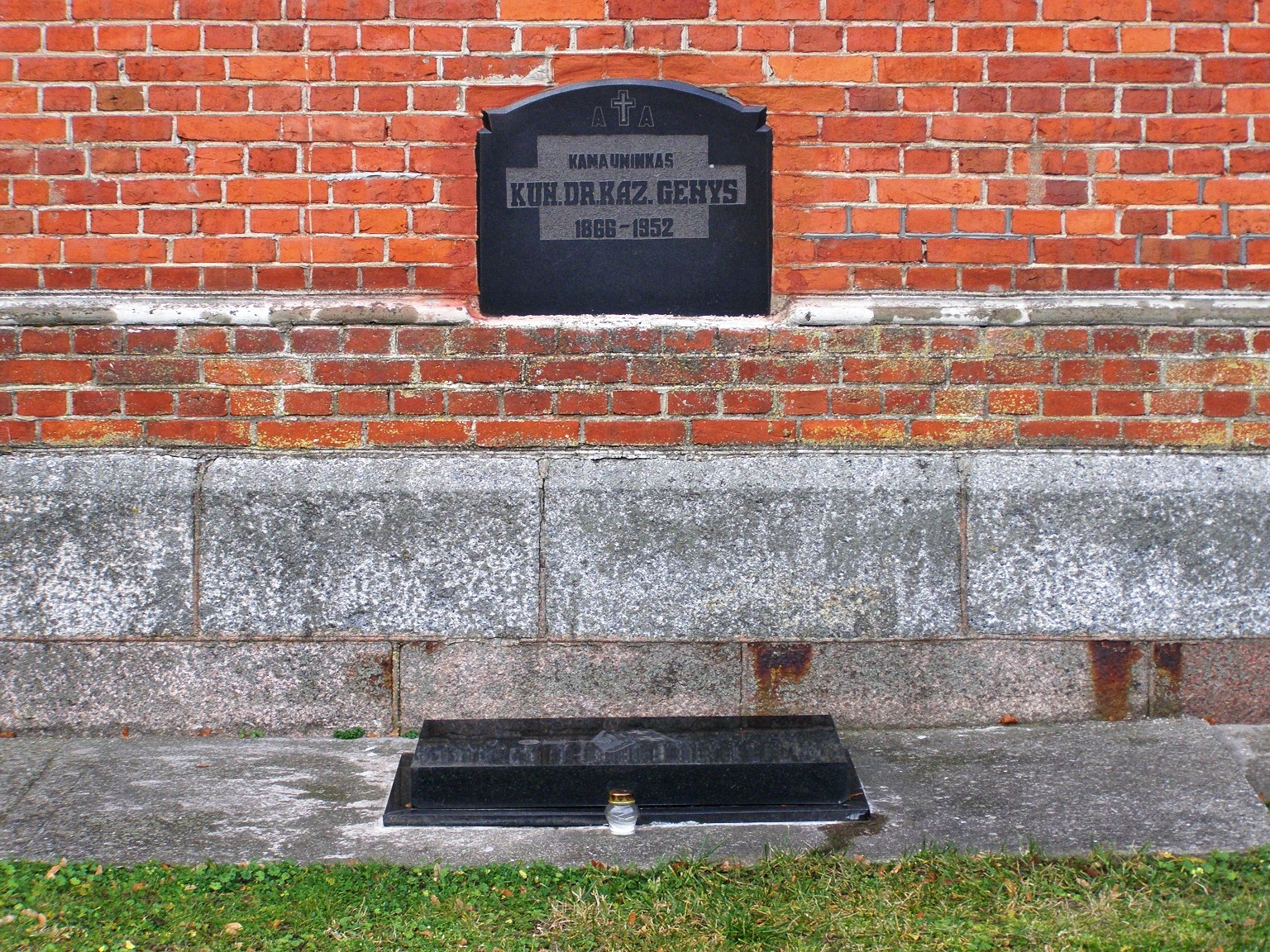
Grave of priest Dr Kazimieras Genys (1866–1952)

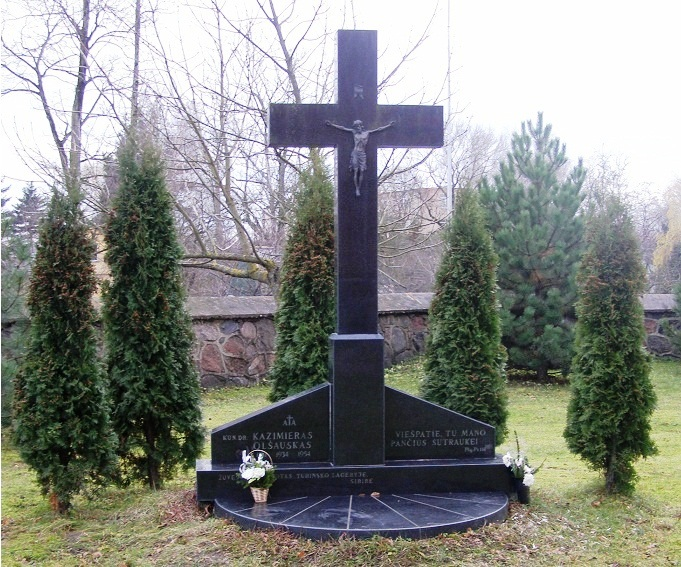
Memorial cross of Siberian martyr Kazimieras Olšauskas (1911–1954)

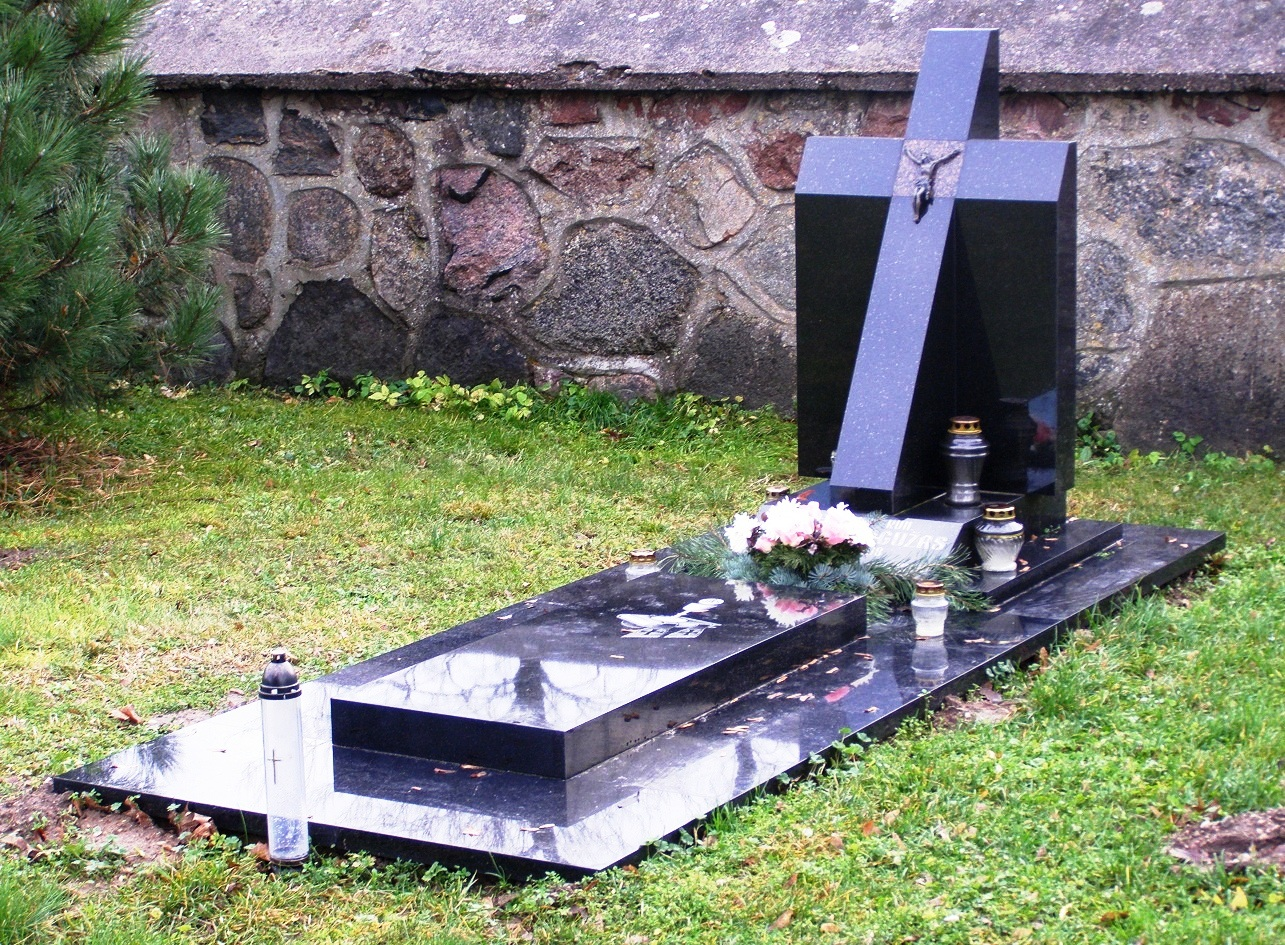
Grave of exiled priest Brunonas Bagužas (1920–2008)

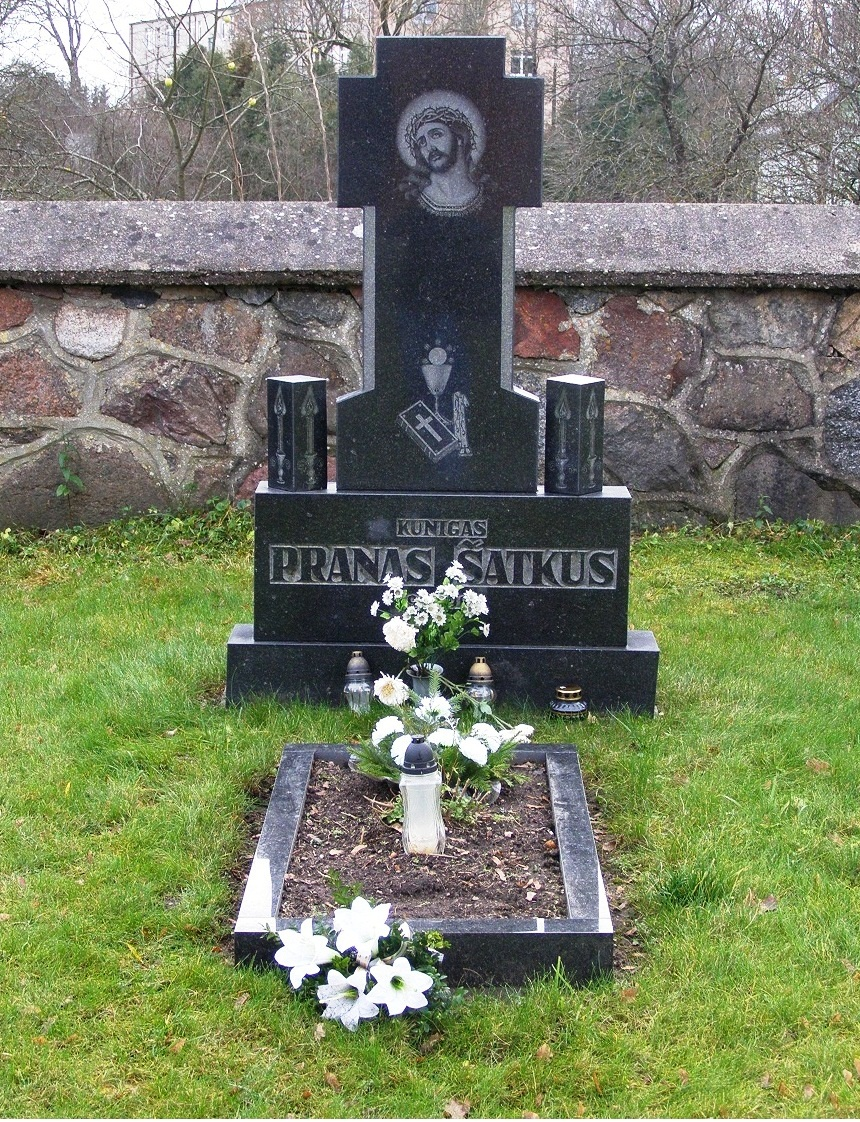
Grave of exiled priest Pranciškus Šatkus (1901–1986)

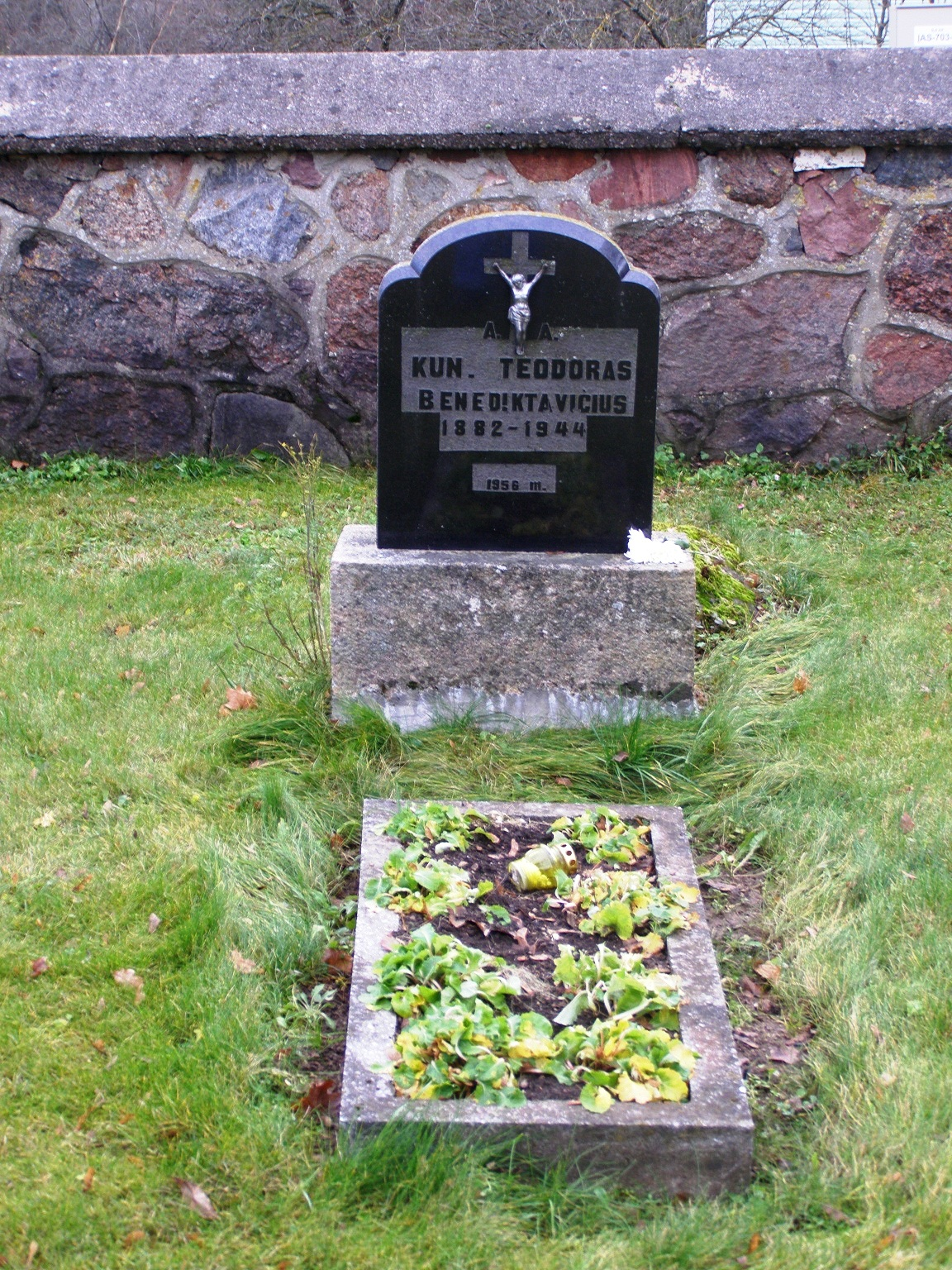
Grave of priest Teodoras Benediktavičius (1882–1944)

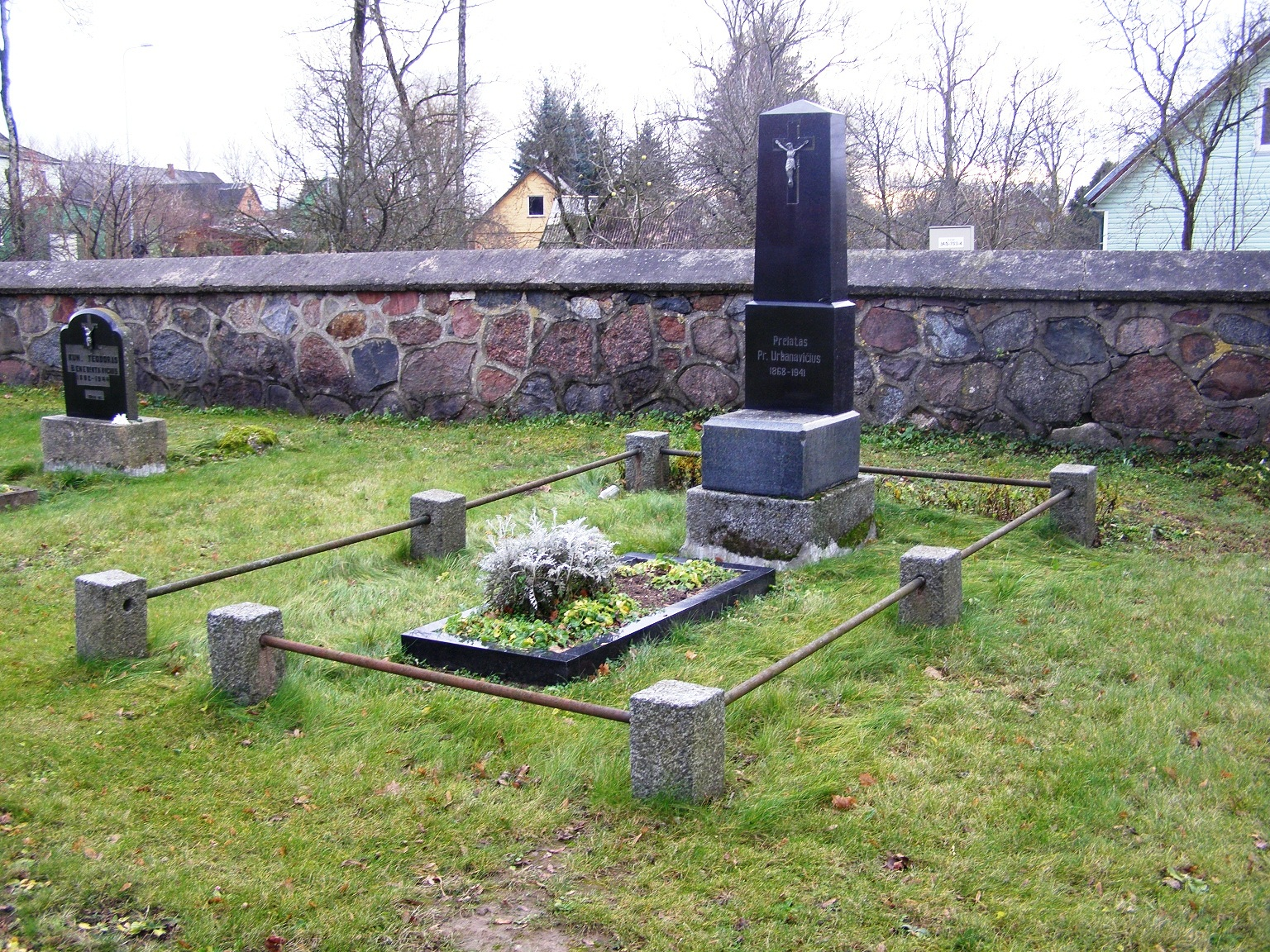
Grave of church builder and prelate Pranas Urbonavičius (1868–1941)

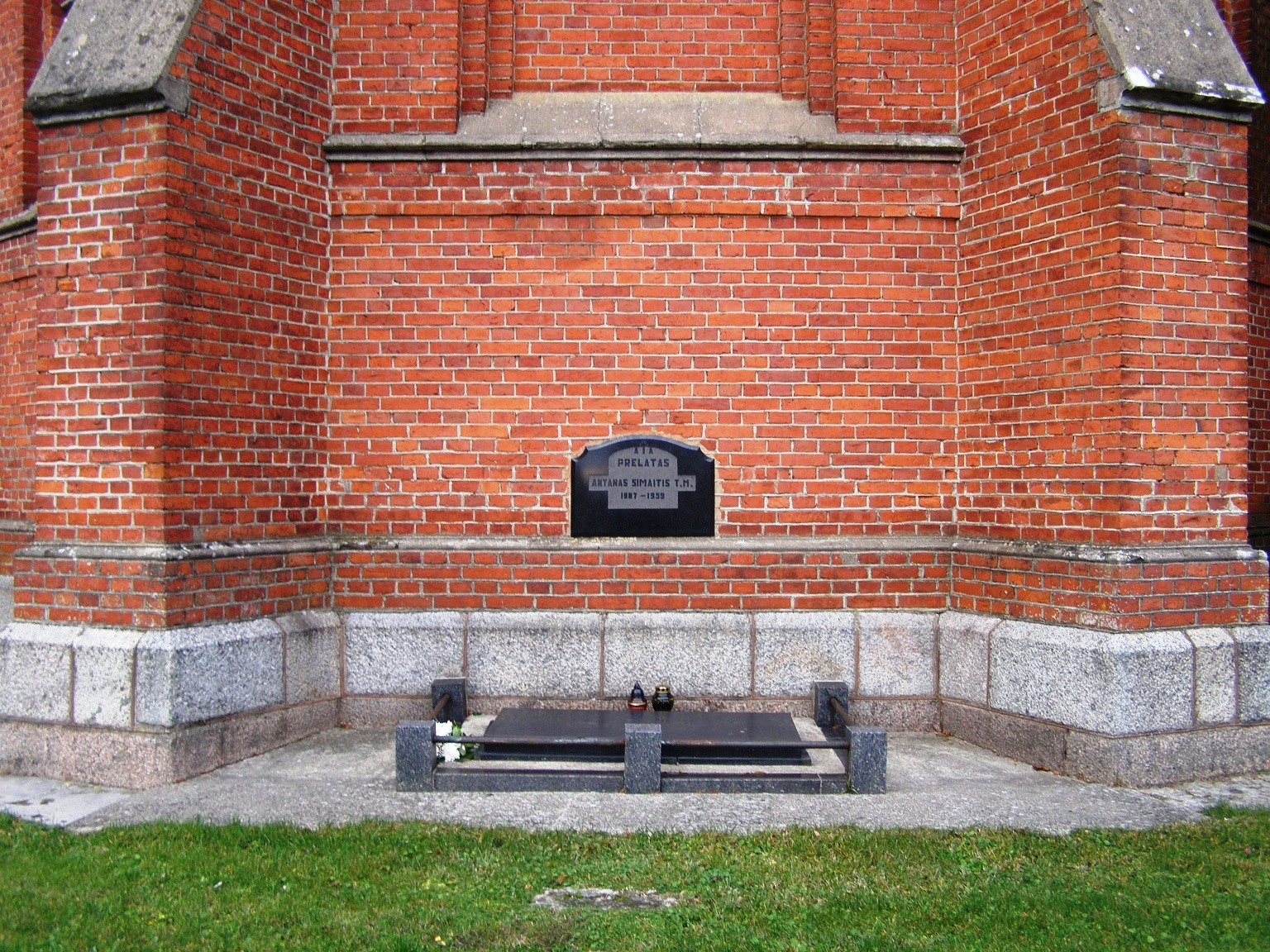
Grave of prelate Antanas Simaitis (1887–1959)
