= Kūlupėnai Eldership =

Eldership of Lithuania

The Kūlupėnai Eldership (Lithuanian: Kūlupėnų seniūnija) is an eldership of Lithuania, located in the Kretinga District Municipality. In 2021 its population was 1407.
