= Kartena =

- Town
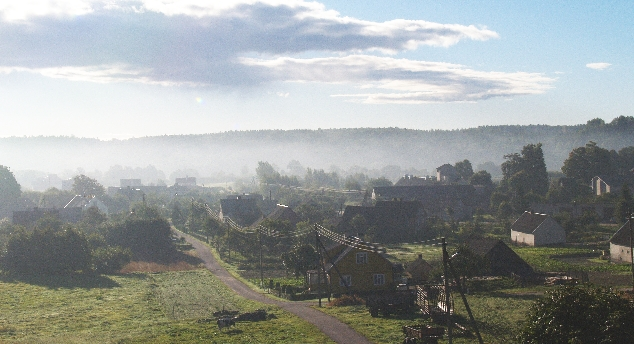

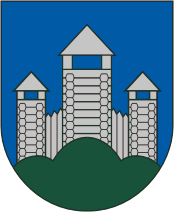
- Seal

- Location within Lithuania
- Coordinates: 55°55′10″N 21°28′10″E
- Country: Lithuania
- County: Klaipėda County

Population (2011)
  - Total: 931
- Time zone: UTC+2 (EET)
  - Summer (DST): UTC+3 (EEST)

Kartena is a town in Klaipėda County, in northwestern Lithuania. According to the 2011 census, the town has a population of 931 people. The city is one of the settlements that are near the A11 highway.
