= Uno Loop =

Estonian musician and athlete (1930–2021)

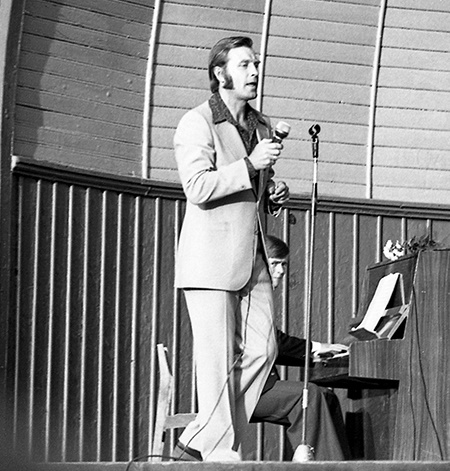
- Loop performing in 1974

Background information
- Born: 31 May 1930; Tallinn, Estonia
- Died: 8 September 2021 (aged 91) Keila, Harju County, Estonia
- Genres: Estrada, jazz, swing, pop, bossa nova
- Occupations: Singer, guitarist, athlete, actor, educator
- Instruments: Vocals, guitar
- Years active: 1952–2010
- Labels: Melodiya; Theka; Eesti Raadio; HyperElwood

Uno Loop (31 May 1930 – 8 September 2021) was an Estonian singer, musician, athlete, actor, and educator. Loop's career as a musician and singer began in the early 1950s. He performed with various ensembles and as a popular soloist beginning in the 1960s. In his youth, he trained as a boxer, and became the 1947–48 light-middleweight two-time Estonian Junior Champion. Later, he trained as a triathlete. Between the late 1950s and the early 1990s, he taught music, voice and guitar. Loop also worked as an actor, and appeared in several films beginning in the 1960s and in several roles in Estonian television series.

== Early life, education, and sport ==
Uno Loop was born in Tallinn to Eduard and Amilde Hildegard Loop (née Vesiloik) and grew up in Tallinn and the village of Nabala in Harju County. Interested in music from an early age, he attended the Music School of Tallinn, receiving a degree in music theory in 1958 and became an accomplished guitarist. In his youth, Loop was also interested in athletics, particularly boxing, and began training and competing in matches in his early teens. At the age of 17, he became the 1947–48 light-middleweight two-time Estonian Junior Champion. After school, he initially planned on becoming a sailor, but was invited by composer, musician, and Music School of Tallinn music theory lecturer Uno Naissoo to join his swing and jazz music ensemble Swing Club as a guitarist.

== Career ==
=== Musician and educator ===
While performing with the ensemble Swing Club, Loop also began teaching music and guitar at his alma mater, the Tallinn Higher Music School in 1959. In the late 1950s, he also performed with the Tallinn-based ensemble Sinilind and the jazz group Metronoom, which included Uno Naissoo and other notable singers, composers, and musicians such as Kalju Terasmaa, Eri Klas, Tiit Varts, and Hillar Kareva. In 1960, he performed as a singer and guitarist with the Estonian Radio Male Quartet with Eri Klas, Kalju Terasmaa and Arved Haug, leaving to join the Estonian Radio Estrada (Variety) Orchestra. The quartet recorded several songs with noted Estonian baritone Georg Ots. From 1961 until 1965, he performed as a soloist singer for the National Philharmonic of the Estonian SSR.

During the 1960s, Loop became a popular soloist singer, performing Estonian language light pop, jazz, and estrada music, and was frequently seen on Eesti Televisioon (ETV). One of his first hits of the era was the 1963 Arne Oit-composed and Heldur Karmo-penned song "Lõke preerias", which has since been covered by several Estonian artists.

In 1964, Uno Loop wrote the first Estonian language guitar textbook, Kitarrimängu õpik, published by Eesti Riiklik Kirjastus and illustrated by Olev Subbi. It remained the only Estonian language guitar textbook until 1991.

Popular hit songs from the 1970s include "Mis värvi on armastus" from 1971, and several duets with singer Heidy Tamme (a singer he frequently performed with since the 1960s) including "Uued Laulud" in 1971 and "Na-na-na" in 1973. In 1970, the Melodiya label released the bossa nova album Uno Loop, Marju Kuut which featured Loop performing with singer Marju Kuut. In 1972, another pairing with Kuut, Marju Kuut & Uno Loop, was released. Other popular songs from his repertoire include: "Korraks vaid", "Isad ja pojad", "Kamina ees", "Väike neiu", "Ära koo mu käpikuisse päikest", "Vana klaver", "Oled teinud mind õnnelikuks", "Suudlused soolaste huultega", "Sinilind", and "Päiksepoolsel tänaval". Throughout his career, he has performed with and recorded music with a number of prominent musicians and singers, including Voldemar Kuslap, Ivo Linna, Jaak Joala, Kalmer Tennosaar, Els Himma, Vally Ojavere, Heli Lääts, and Ülle Toming. In addition to his native Estonian, Loop has also performed and recorded music in the Russian language. During his solo career and work with various ensembles, Loop has released dozens of albums, with numerous greatest hits albums being released throughout the 1990s and into the 2010s.

From 1975 until 1992, Loop taught guitar, song, and music at the Georg Ots Tallinn Music School. In 1980, he returned to studies at Tallinn Pedagogical University (now, Tallinn University), and received a degree in orchestral conducting.

Loop's last public performance was a concert held at the Nokia (Alexela) Concert Hall in Tallinn on 30 December 2010, and he retired shortly afterwards.

=== Actor ===
In 1961, Loop garnered his first acting role as Paul in the Viktor Nevežin-directed Tallinna Kinostuudio (now, Tallinnfilm) musical comedy Juhuslik kohtumine, starring Georg Ots and Lia Laats. This was followed by a few smaller roles in the early 1970s, mostly performing musical numbers. In 1969, he appeared in the Tõnis Kask-directed Russian language drama film Chyornyy, kak ya, based on the 1961 book Black Like Me by American journalist John Howard Griffin. In the intervening years, he could often be seen on television as a musical performer. In 2010, he made two guest appearances as the character Erlend Rüütli on the TV3 comedy-crime series Kättemaksukontor.

=== Athlete ===
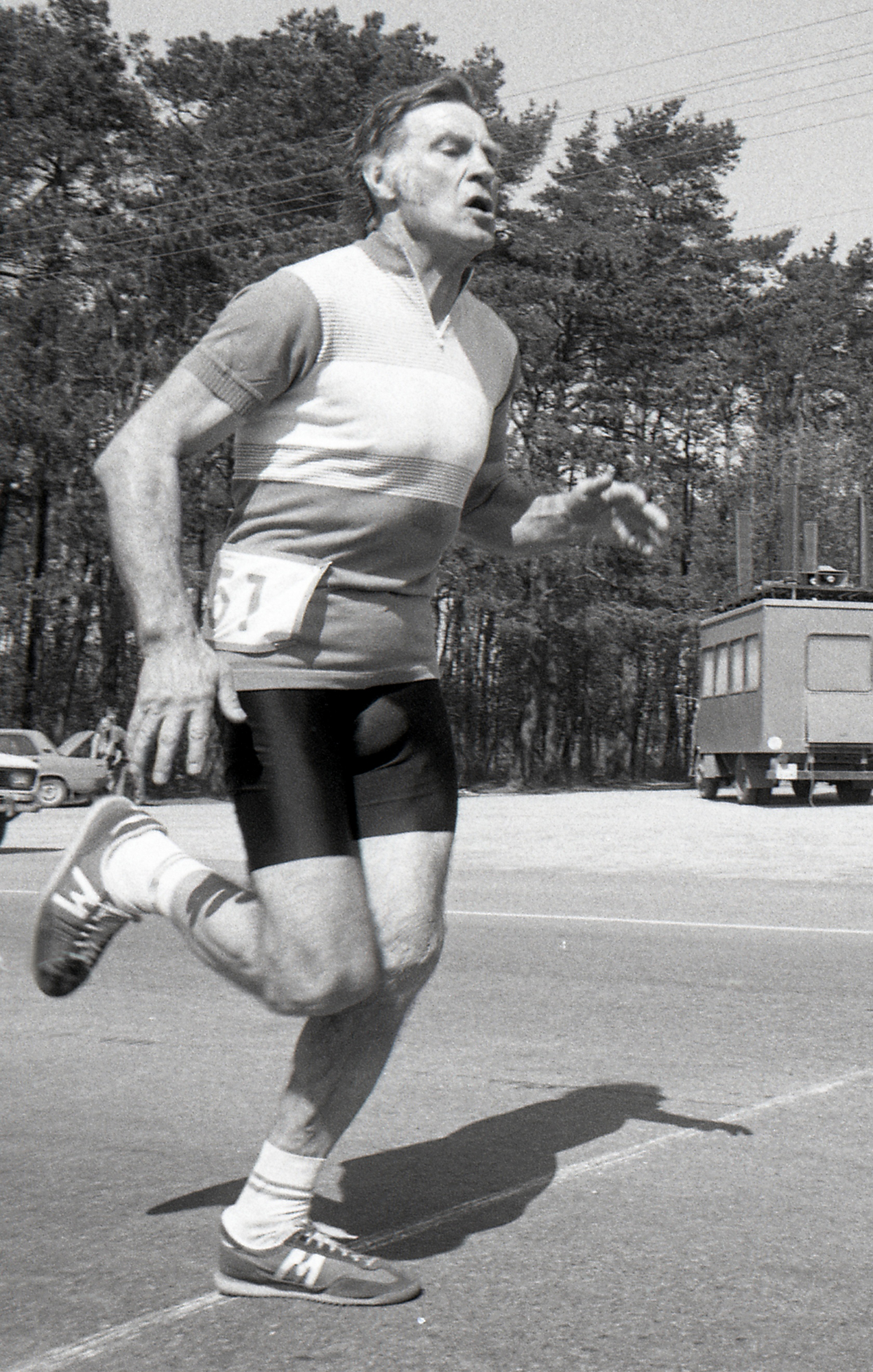
Loop participating in a triathlon in Tallinn in 1988

Interested in sports since his youth as a boxer, in 1993, Loop founded the XXI Sajandi Klubi (21st Century Triathlon Club) and was the club's CEO until 2007, and later was the club's Honorary President. From 1992 until 1997, Loop was a board member of the Estonian Triathlon Union, and an Honorary Member since 1997.

=== Other ventures ===
In 2000, Loop was a founding member of the Estonian Performers' Union (Eesti Esitajate Liit, or EEL), a non-profit organization established to administer and promote the rights of performers by collecting remunerations under the Estonian Copyright Act and distributing them among artists and performers who are entitled to them.

== Personal life and death ==
Uno Loop married Aino Pere in 1949. The couple had two children. He also had a daughter from a previous relationship. The couple lived at their summer home in Laulasmaa in Harju County following Loop's retirement. In June 2019, they celebrated their 70th wedding anniversary. In his later years, he had given up most sports, including cycling, swimming, and jogging, but continued to exercise.

In November 2019, after several health issues, Loop began residing at a nursing home in Keila at age 89. His wife, Aino, died 22 February 2020, aged 89. Loop died following a lengthy illness on 8 September 2021, aged 91. His funeral took place on 17 September at Keila church. Notable attendees included Prime Minister of Estonia Kaja Kallas, as well as singers and musicians Ivo Linna, Katrin Karisma, Urmas Lattikas, Erich Krieger, Jaan Elgula, and Tanel Padar. He was interred at Rahumäe Cemetery in Tallinn.

== Legacy ==
In 2009, journalist and author Enno Tammer wrote a biography of Loop titled Uno Loop: läbi elu ("Uno Loop: Through Life"), published by Tammerraamat in Tallinn.

On 14 February 2014, the Peep Pedmanson-penned and Hardi Volmer-directed musical play Uno Bossa ehk Uno Loobi seitse elu ("Uno Bossa, or The Seven Lives of Uno Loop") premiered at the Rakvere Theatre, which chronicled Loop's long musical career, with actor Margus Grosnõi playing the part of Loop.

== Awards and honors ==
- Meritorious Artist of the Estonian SSR (1981)
- Order of the White Star, Medal Class (2001)
- Tallinn University Alumni of the Century (shared with others; 2019)
