= Kurevere =

Kurevere may refer to several places in Estonia:

- Kurevere, Harju County, village in Kiili Parish, Harju County
- Kurevere, Lääne County, village in Lääne-Nigula Parish, Lääne County
- Kurevere, Rapla County, village in Märjamaa Parish, Rapla County
- Kurevere, Saare County, village in Saaremaa Parish, Saare County
- Kurevere, Valga County, village in Otepää Parish, Valga County
