= Sõmeru (disambiguation) =

Sõmeru may refer to several places in Estonia:

- Sõmeru Parish, municipality in Lääne-Viru County
- Sõmeru, small borough in Sõmeru Parish, Lääne-Viru County
- Sõmeru, Kiili Parish, village in Kiili Parish, Harju County
- Sõmeru, Kose Parish, village in Kose Parish, Harju County
- Sõmeru, Järva County, village in Paide Parish, Järva County
- Sõmeru, Rapla County, village in Märjamaa Parish, Rapla County
