= Alema Nature Reserve =

Protected area in Estonia

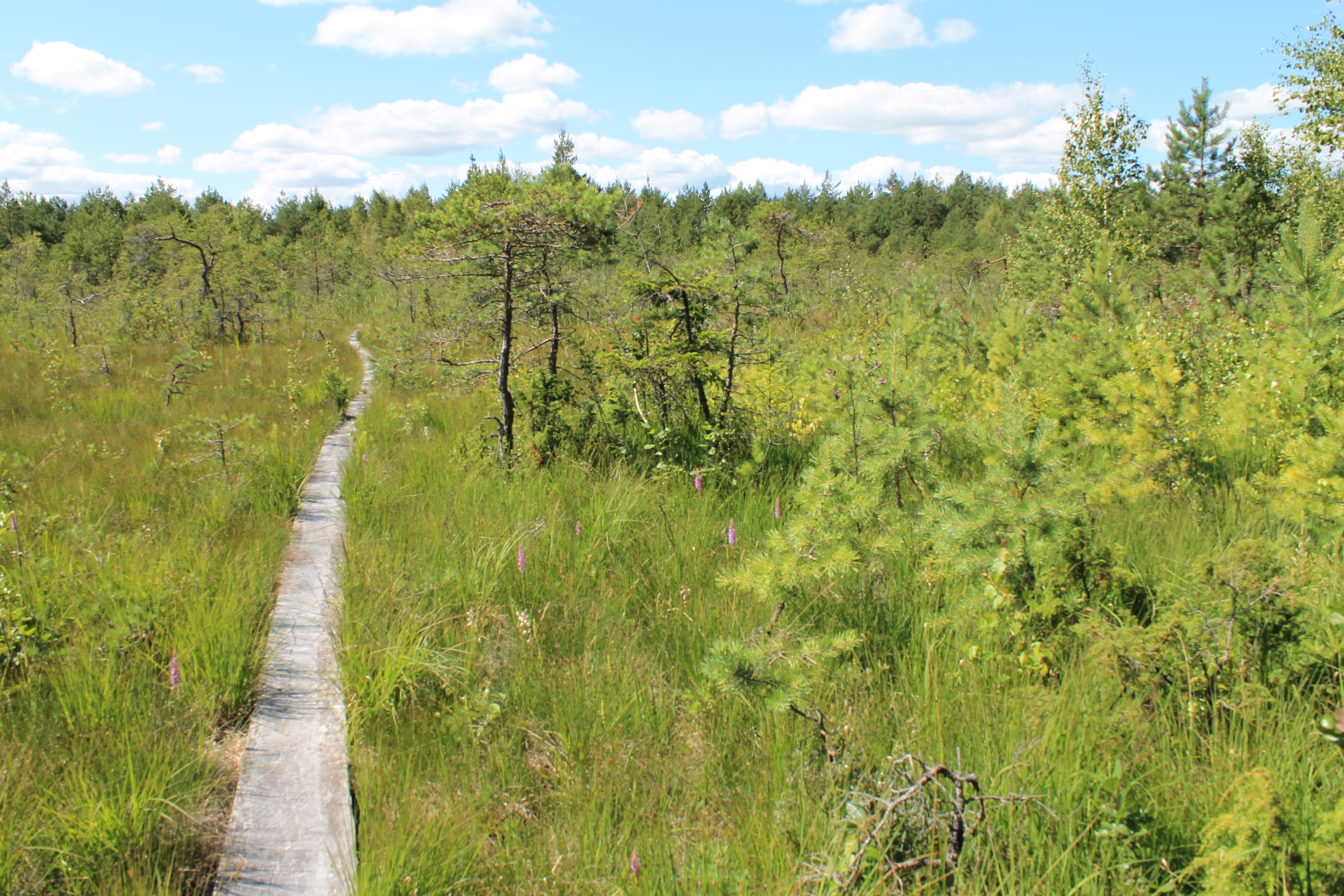

- Location within Estonia
- Location: Estonia
- Nearest city: Rapla
- Coordinates: 59°05′01″N 24°20′21″E
- Area: 54 ha (130 acres)

Alema Nature Reserve is a nature reserve situated in northern Estonia, in Harju County.

The nature reserve has been established to protect the 18 species of orchid identified as existing within the area. There is no other nature reserve in Estonia dedicated only to the protection of orchids. In addition, several carnivorous plants are known to grow within Alema nature reserve, such as common butterwort, sundew and bladderwort. For the convenience of visitors, a trail has been prepared in the nature reserve.
