= Tammejärve =

Village in Estonia

Coordinates: 59°20′29″N 24°46′17″E

- Village
- Interactive map of Tammejärve
- Country: Estonia
- County: Harju County
- Parish: Saku Parish
- Time zone: UTC+2 (EET)
  - Summer (DST): UTC+3 (EEST)

Tammejärve was a village in Saku Parish, Harju County in northern Estonia. It was located between Lake Raku and Tallinn–Viljandi road. On 1 July 2019 Tammejärve village was dissolved and its territory was divided between Kangru and Luige small boroughs of Kiili Parish and Männiku village of Saku Parish.

== See also ==
- Männiku training area
