= Lähtse =

Village in Estonia

Coordinates: 59°17′36″N 24°51′11″E

- Village
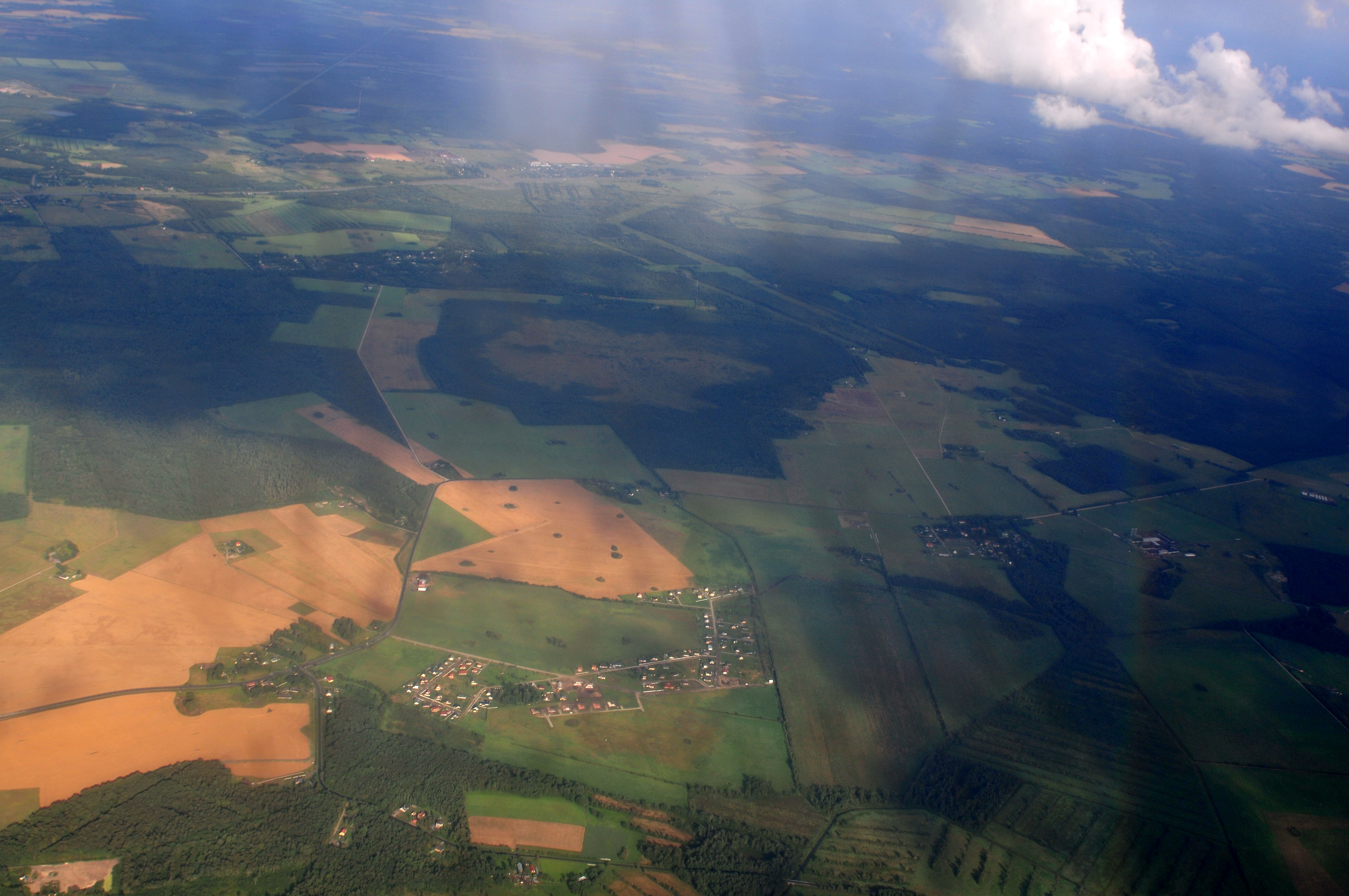
- Aerial view of Lähtse.
- Interactive map of Lähtse
- Country: Estonia
- County: Harju County
- Parish: Kiili Parish
- Time zone: UTC+2 (EET)
  - Summer (DST): UTC+3 (EEST)

Lähtse is a village in Kiili Parish, Harju County in northern Estonia.
