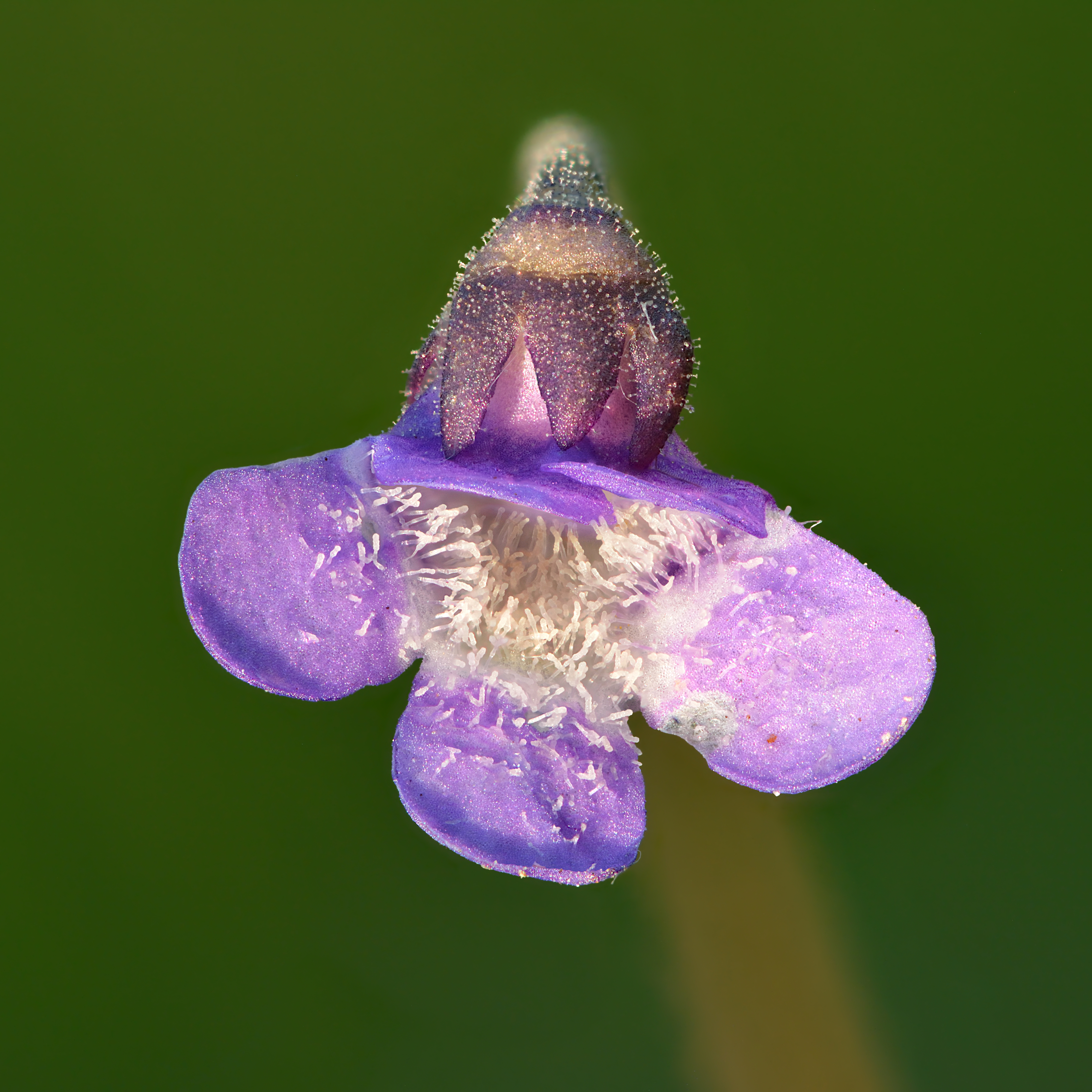

Conservation status
- Least Concern (IUCN 3.1)

Scientific classification
- Kingdom: Plantae
- Clade: Embryophytes
- Clade: Tracheophytes
- Clade: Angiosperms
- Clade: Eudicots
- Clade: Asterids
- Order: Lamiales
- Family: Lentibulariaceae
- Genus: Pinguicula
- Species: P. vulgaris

Binomial name
- Pinguicula vulgaris L.

= Pinguicula vulgaris =

Species of flowering plant

Pinguicula vulgaris, the common butterwort, is a perennial carnivorous plant in the butterwort genus of the family Lentibulariaceae.

== Description ==
It grows to a height of 3–16 centimetres (1.2–6.3 in), and is topped with a purple, and occasionally white, flower that is 15 millimetres (0.59 in) or longer, and shaped like a funnel. This butterwort grows in damp environments such as bogs and swamps, in low or subalpine elevations. Being native to environments with cold winters, they produce a winter-resting bud (hibernaculum). There are three forms originating from Europe: P. vulgaris f. bicolor, which has petals that are white and purple; P. vulgaris f. albida, which has all white petals; and P. vulgaris f. alpicola, which has larger flowers. The taxonomic status of these forms is not universally recognised – see e.g. The Plant List.

Common butterwort is an insectivorous plant. Its leaves have glands that excrete a sticky fluid that traps insects; the glands also produce enzymes that digest the insects. This serves as a way for the plant to access a source of nitrogen, as they generally grow in soil that is acidic and low in nutrients, such as bogs. Insect capture is an adaptation to nutrient-poor conditions, and the plant is highly dependent on insects for nitrogen.

== Distribution ==
It has a generally circumboreal distribution, being native to almost every country in Europe as well as Russia, Canada, and the United States. It is generally found growing in places such as bogs, fens, alvars, and other areas with limestone bedrock and alkaline waters.

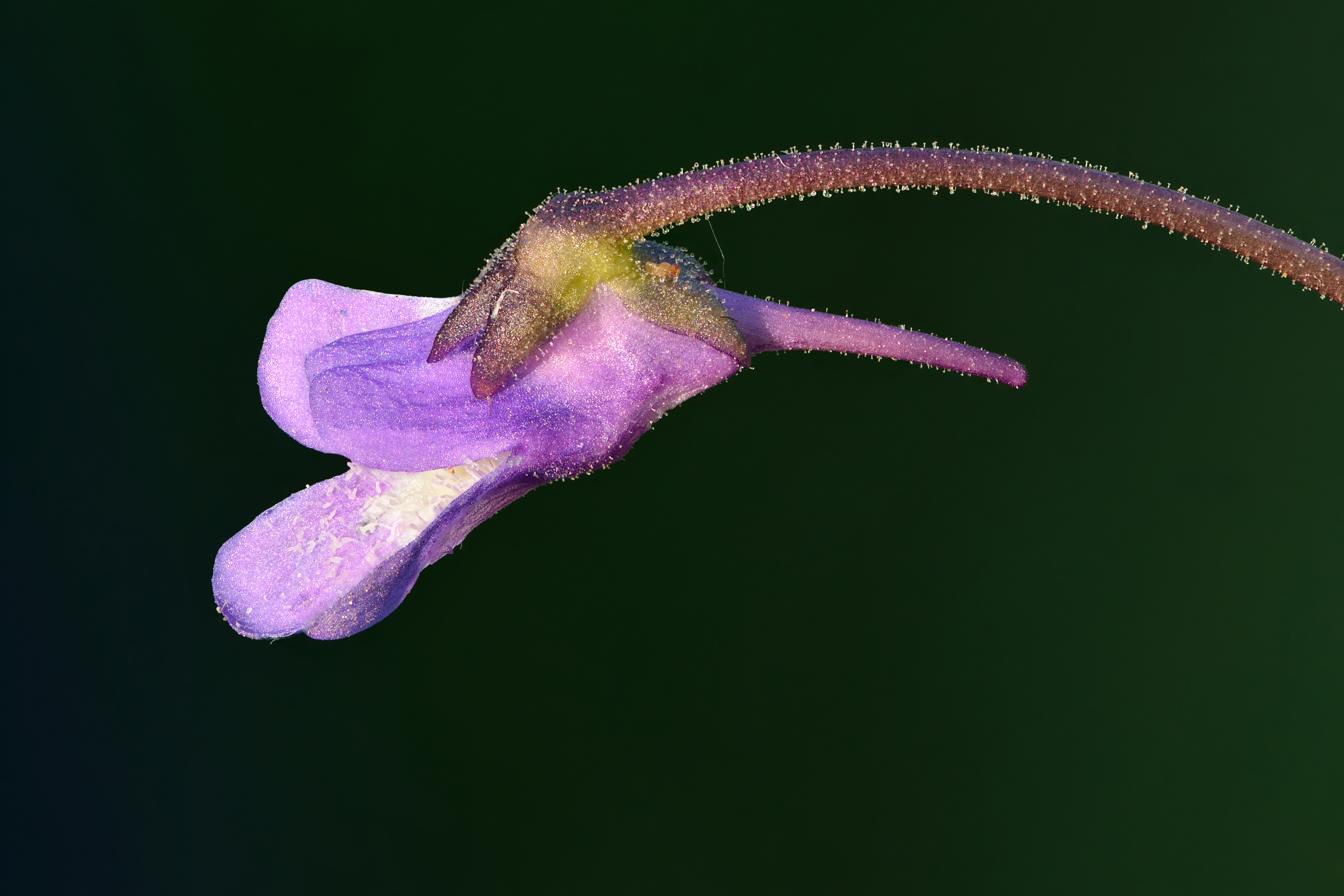
Flower from the side, Niitvälja bog, Estonia

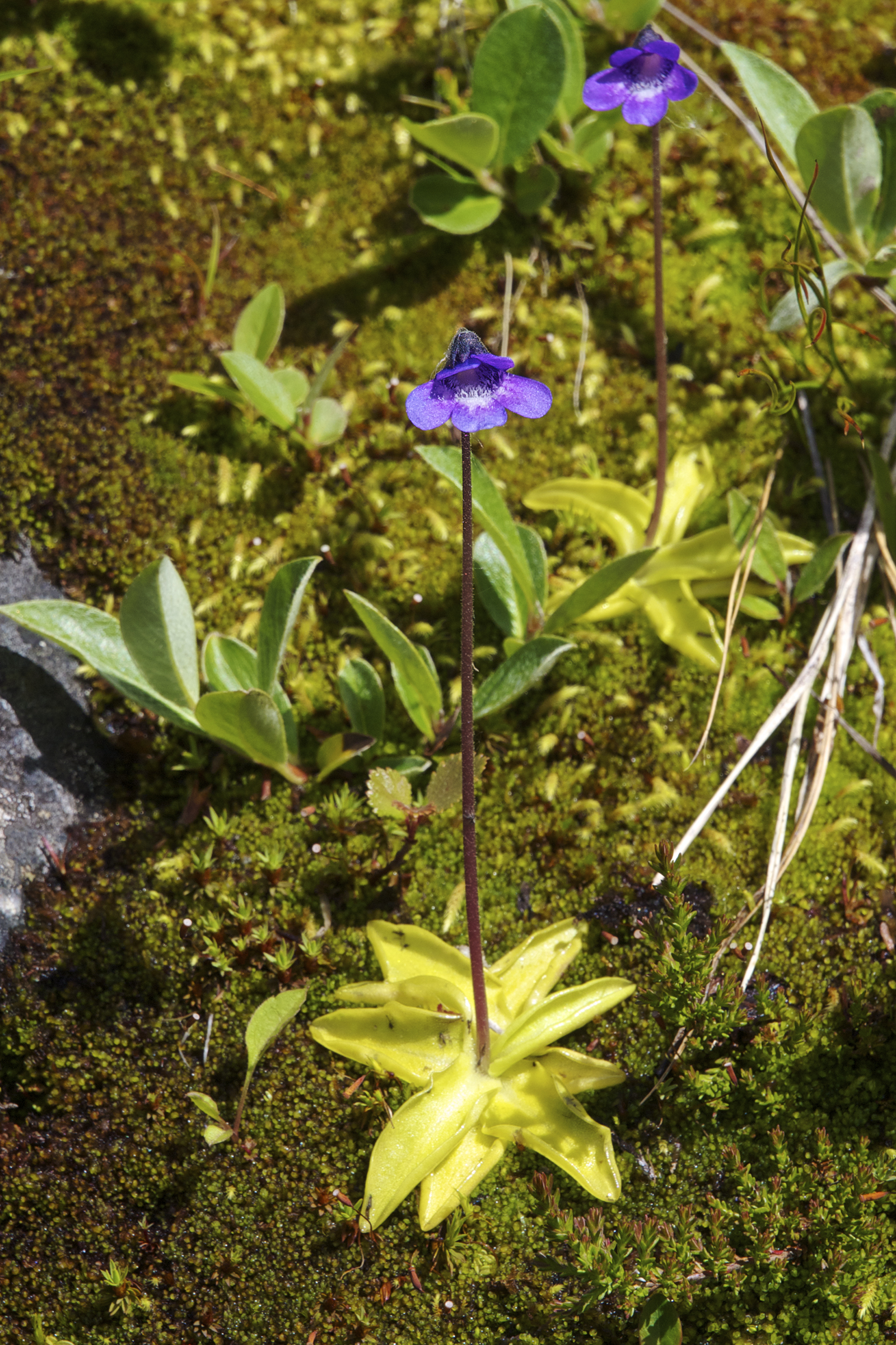
Whole plant, Norway

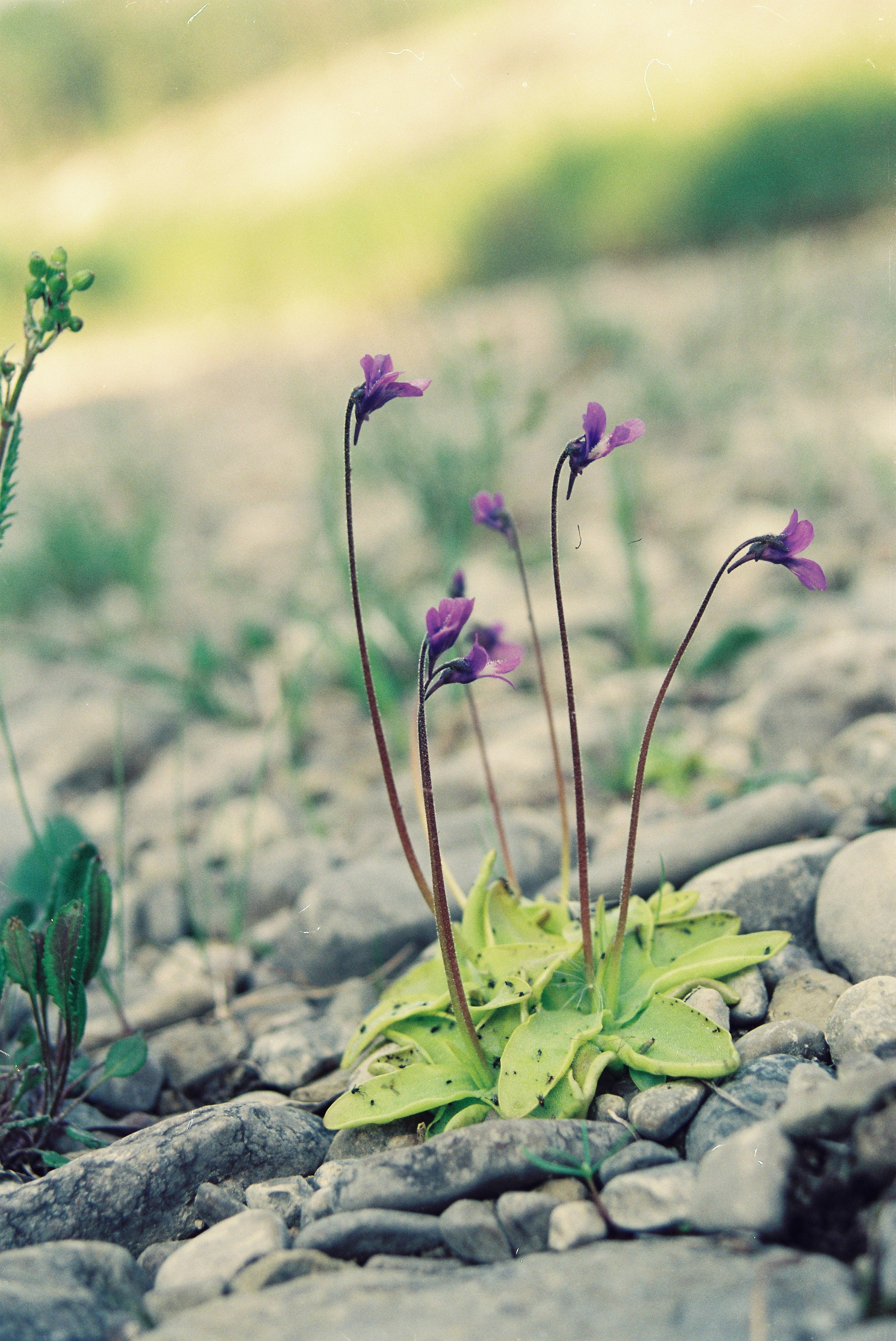
Anticosti Island, Mc Donald River bank, Quebec, Canada

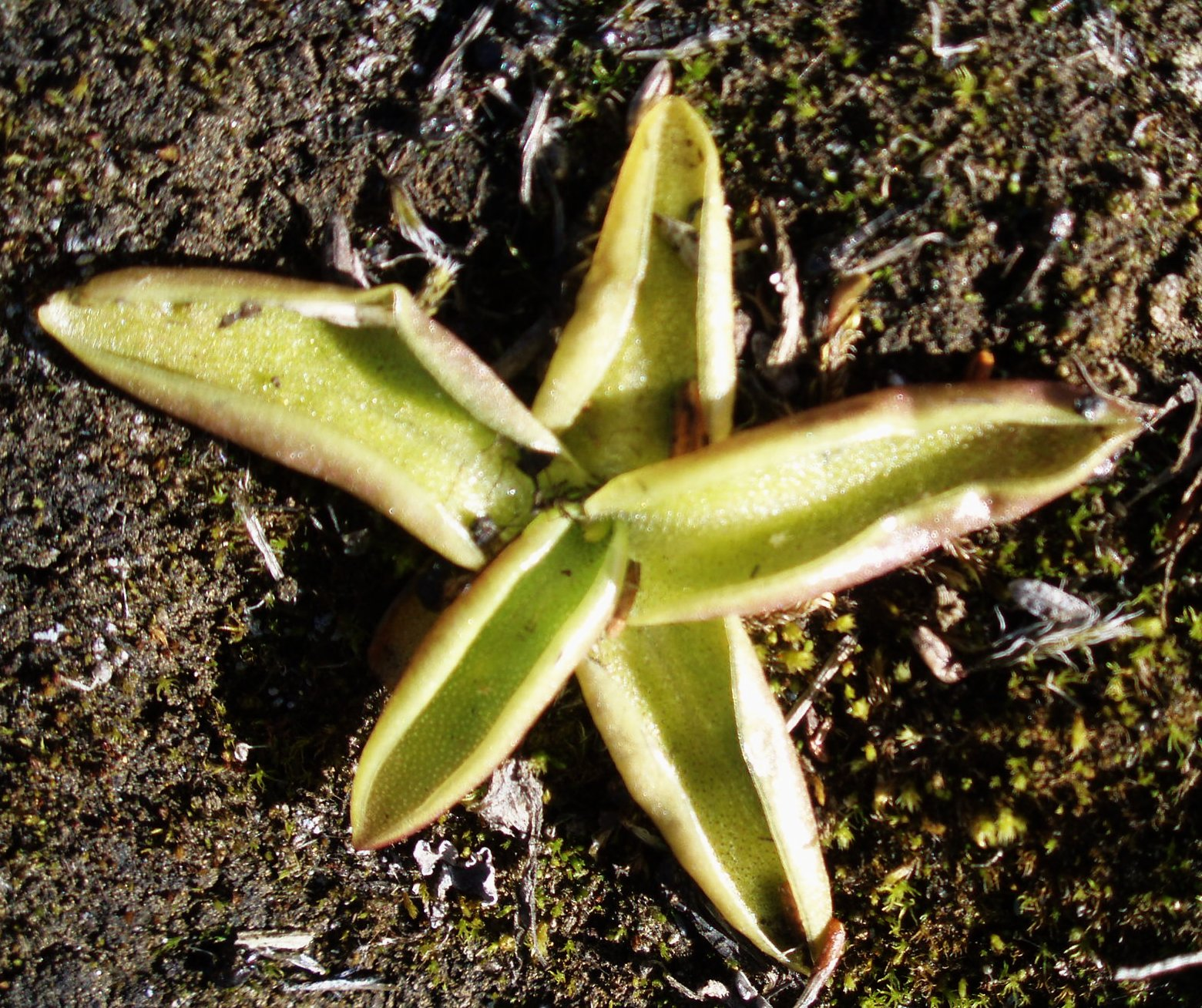
Pinguicula vulgaris near Mývatn, northern Iceland

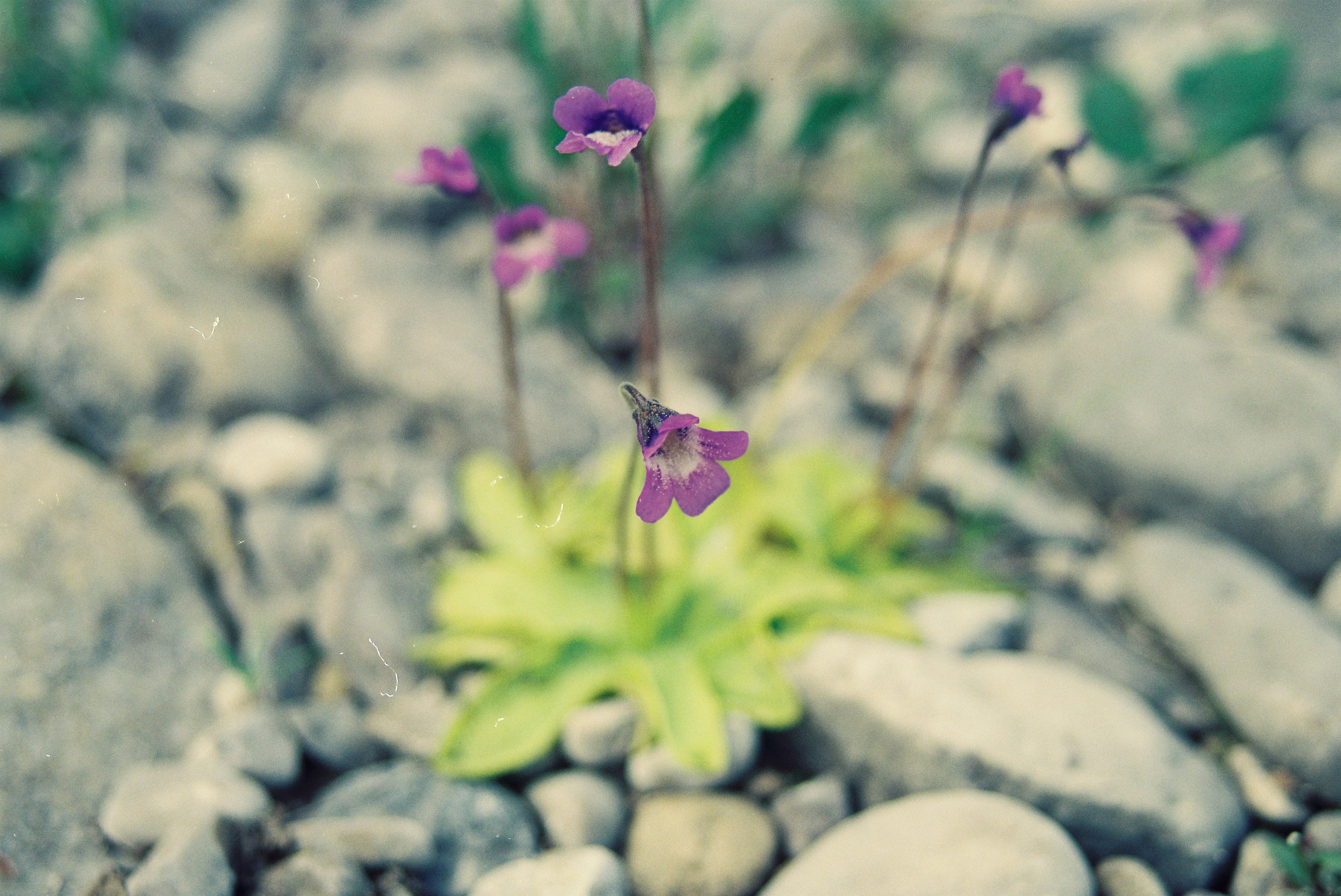
Anticosti Island, Mc Donald River bank, Quebec, Canada
