= Vaela =

Village in Estonia

Coordinates: 59°20′N 24°49′E

- Village
- Interactive map of Vaela
- Country: Estonia
- County: Harju County
- Parish: Kiili Parish
- Time zone: UTC+2 (EET)
  - Summer (DST): UTC+3 (EEST)

Vaela is a village in Kiili Parish of Harju County in northern Estonia.
