= Piissoo =

Village in Estonia

Coordinates: 59°15′N 24°51′E

- Village
- Interactive map of Piissoo
- Country: Estonia
- County: Harju County
- Parish: Kiili Parish
- Time zone: UTC+2 (EET)
  - Summer (DST): UTC+3 (EEST)

Piissoo is a village in Kiili Parish, Harju County in northern Estonia.
