= Mõisaküla, Harju County =

Village in Estonia

Coordinates: 59°19′20″N 24°51′52″E

Mõisaküla
- Village
- Interactive map of Mõisaküla
- Country: Estonia
- County: Harju County
- Parish: Kiili Parish
- Time zone: UTC+2 (EET)
  - Summer (DST): UTC+3 (EEST)

Mõisaküla is a village in Kiili Parish, Harju County in northern Estonia.
