= Arusta =

Village in Estonia

Coordinates: 59°15′N 24°48′E

- Village
- Interactive map of Arusta
- Country: Estonia
- County: Harju County
- Parish: Kiili Parish
- Time zone: UTC+2 (EET)
  - Summer (DST): UTC+3 (EEST)

Arusta is a village in Kiili Parish, Harju County in northern Estonia.
