= Kangru =

Borough in Estonia

- Small borough
- Location in Estonia
- Coordinates: 59°21′11″N 24°46′51″E
- Country: Estonia
- County: Harju County
- Municipality: Kiili Parish

Population (2009)
  - Total: 431

Kangru is a small borough (Estonian: alevik) in Kiili Parish, Harju County, Estonia, about 10 km (6 mi) south of Tallinn. It has a population of 431 (as of 2009).

Kangru gained its small borough status on 18 August 2008; before that it was a village. On 1 July 2019, a portion of dissolved Tammejärve village was merged with Kangru's territory.
