= Metsanurga, Kiili Parish =

Village in Estonia

Coordinates: 59°16′45″N 24°55′54″E

Metsanurga
- Village
- Interactive map of Metsanurga
- Country: Estonia
- County: Harju County
- Parish: Kiili Parish
- Time zone: UTC+2 (EET)
  - Summer (DST): UTC+3 (EEST)

Metsanurga is a village in Kiili Parish, Harju County in northern Estonia.
