= Sausti =

Village in Estonia

- Village
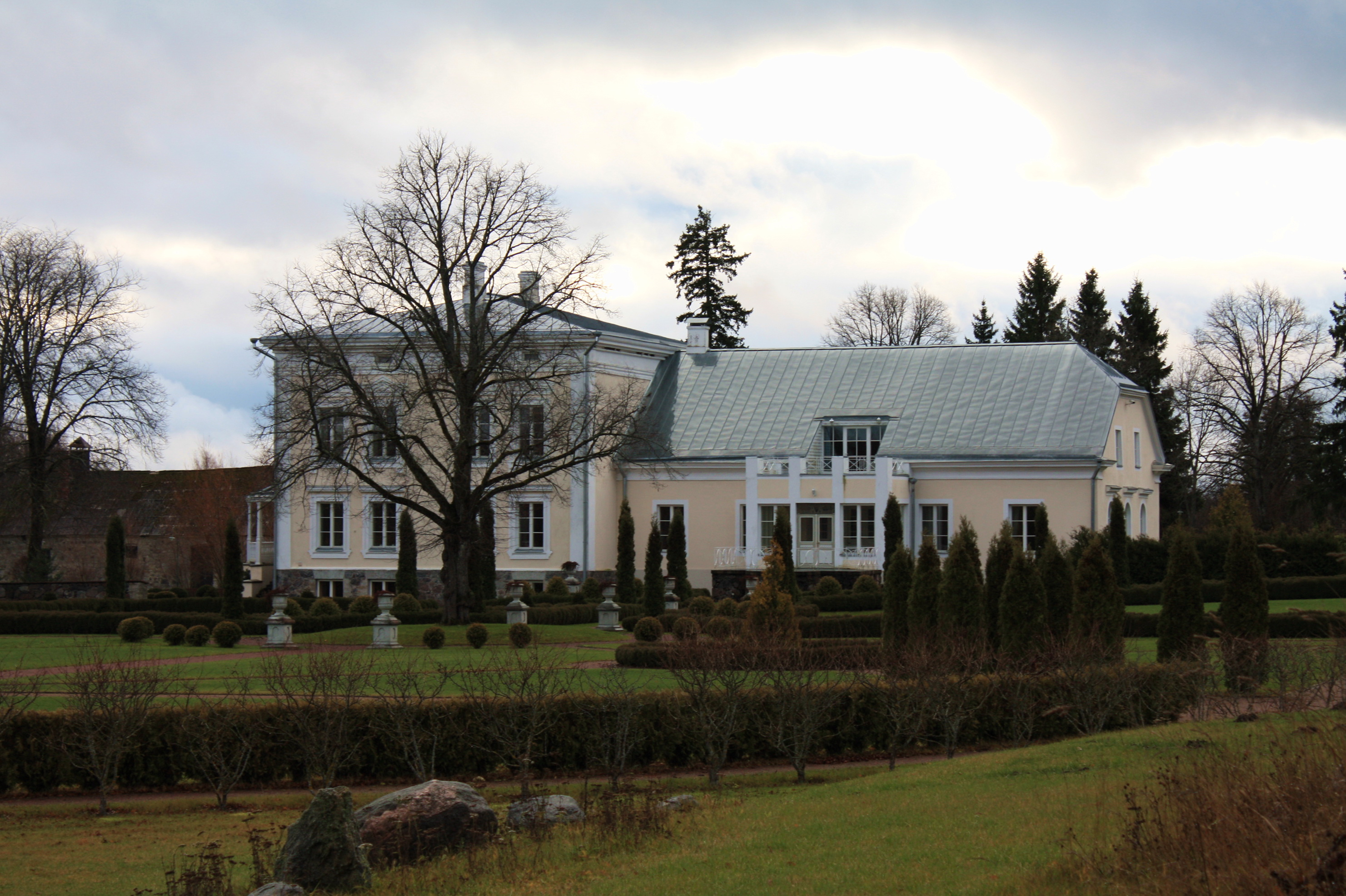
- Sausti Manor

- Location in Estonia
- Coordinates: 59°18′33″N 24°47′59″E
- Country: Estonia
- County: Harju County
- Municipality: Kiili Parish

Population (2009)
  - Total: 153

Sausti is a village in Kiili Parish, Harju County, in northern Estonia, located about 15 km (9 mi) south from the centre of Tallinn. It has a population of 153 (as of 2009).

== Sausti manor ==
Sausti manor has a history that goes back to at least 1453, when it is mentioned for the first time in written records. During the course of history, the main building has been rebuilt continuously. The manor has belonged to various aristocratic, Baltic German families, including the Tiesenhausen family.

== See also ==
- List of palaces and manor houses in Estonia
