= Luige =

Borough in Estonia

- Small borough
- Location in Estonia
- Coordinates: 59°19′38″N 24°46′16″E
- Country: Estonia
- County: Harju County
- Municipality: Kiili Parish

Population (2011 Census)
  - Total: 1,280

Luige is a small borough (Estonian: alevik) in Kiili Parish, Harju County, in northern Estonia, located about 12 km (7 mi) south from the centre of Tallinn. As of the 2011 census, the settlement's population was 1280. Luige gained its small borough status on 18 August 2008, before that it was a village. On 1 July 2019, a portion of dissolved Tammejärve village was merged with Luige's territory.
