= Niitvälja bog =

Bog in Estonia

Coordinates: 59°19′03″N 24°20′24″E

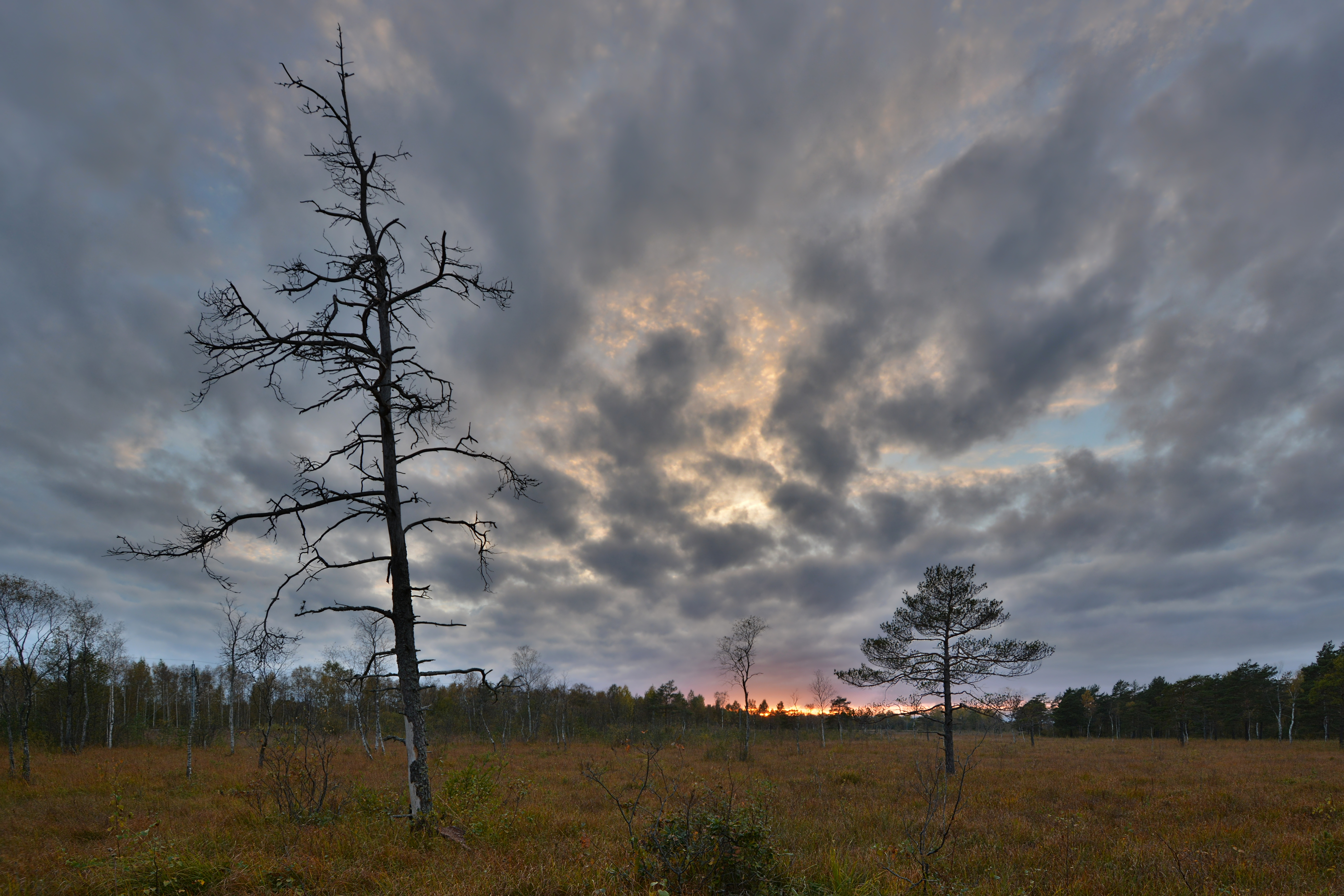
Niitvälja Bog, October 2015

Niitvälja Bog is a fen in Estonia, Harju County. It is situated in the territory of both Lääne-Harju Parish and Keila city and has a size about 100 hectares.

In 2013, an inventory of protected vascular plant species was done at Niitvälja bog by the members of the Estonian Orchid Protection Club. Seven species were found belonging to the 2nd category of protected species in Estonia and 13 species from the 3rd category.

== Gallery ==
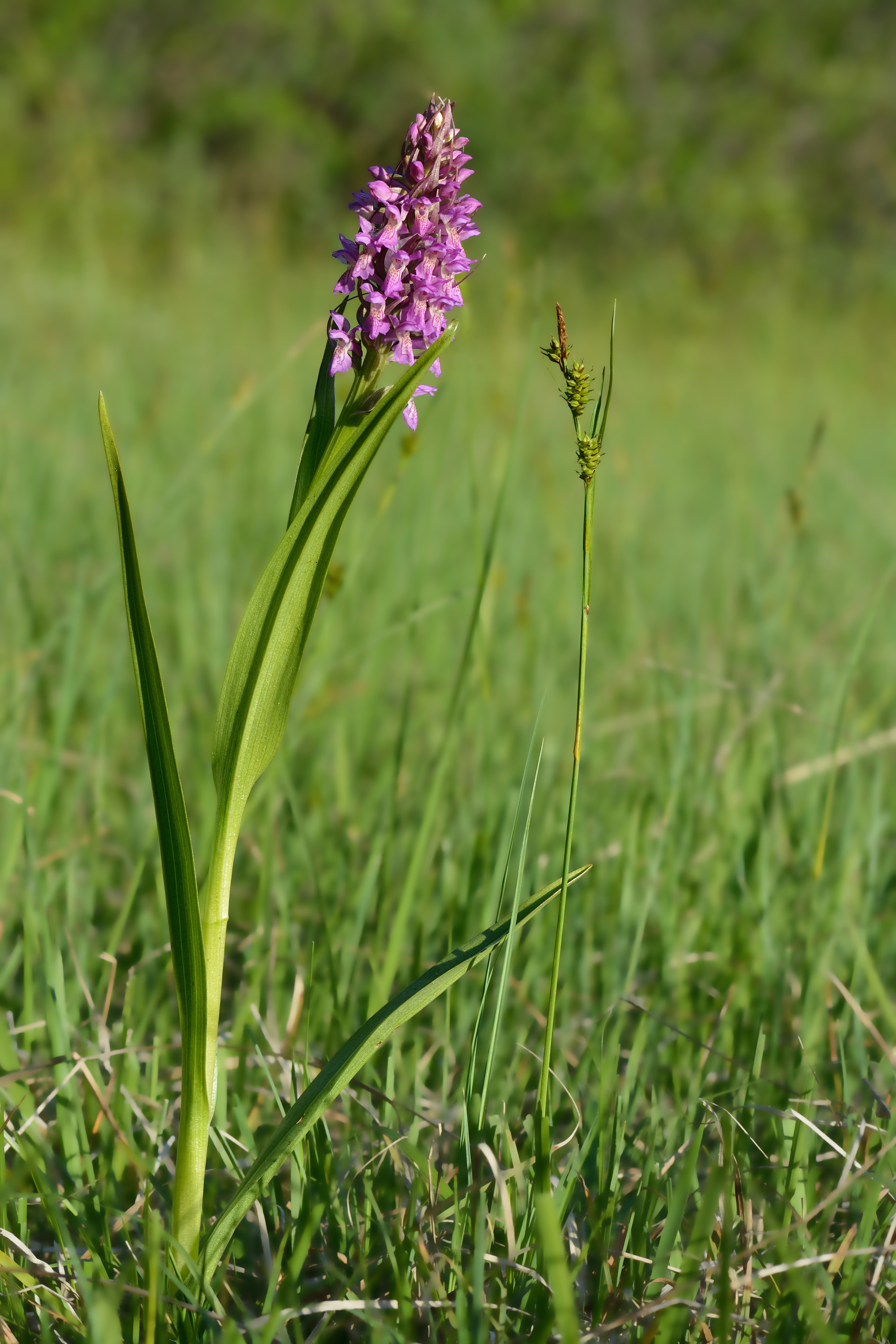
Dactylorhiza incarnata

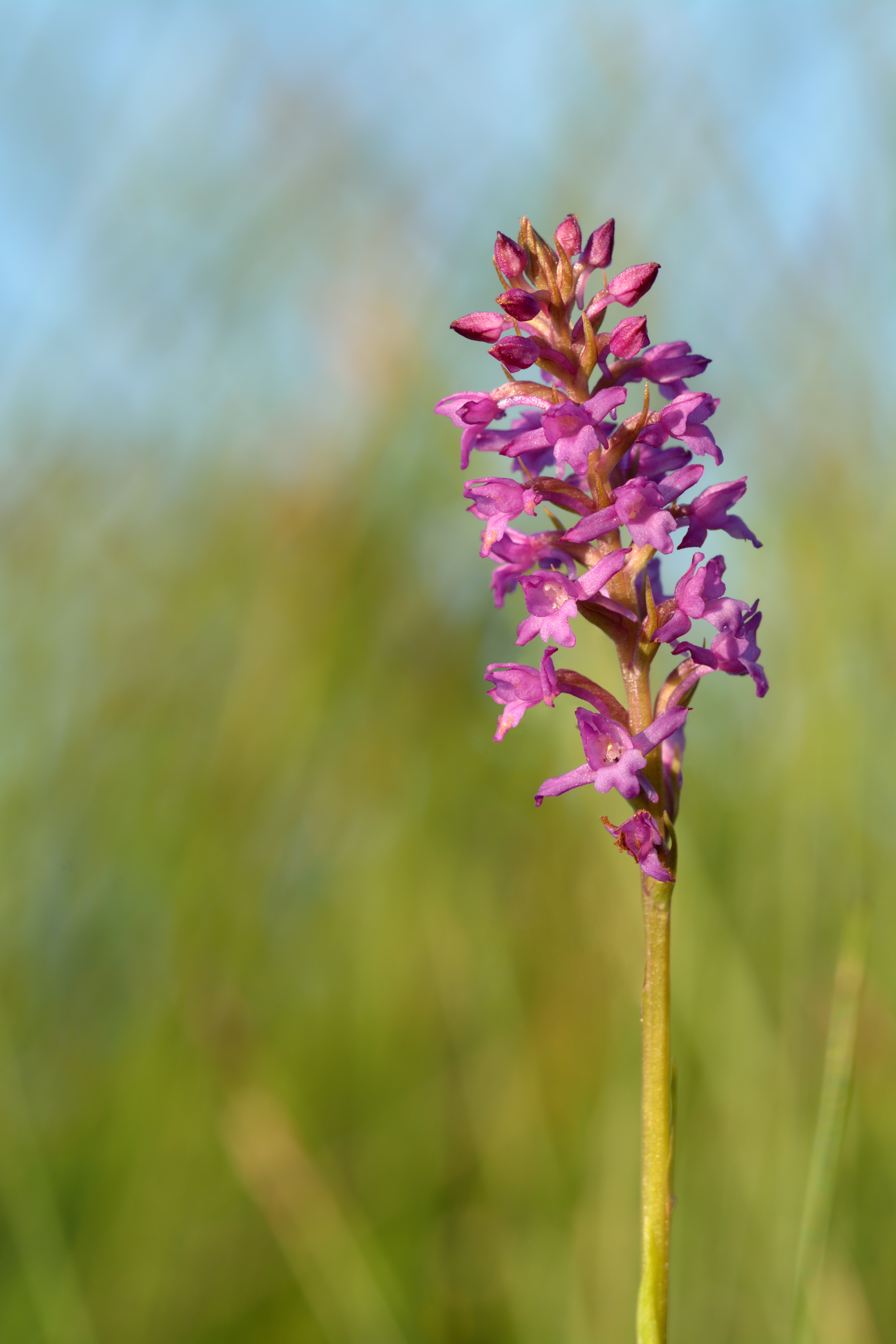
Gymnadenia odoratissima

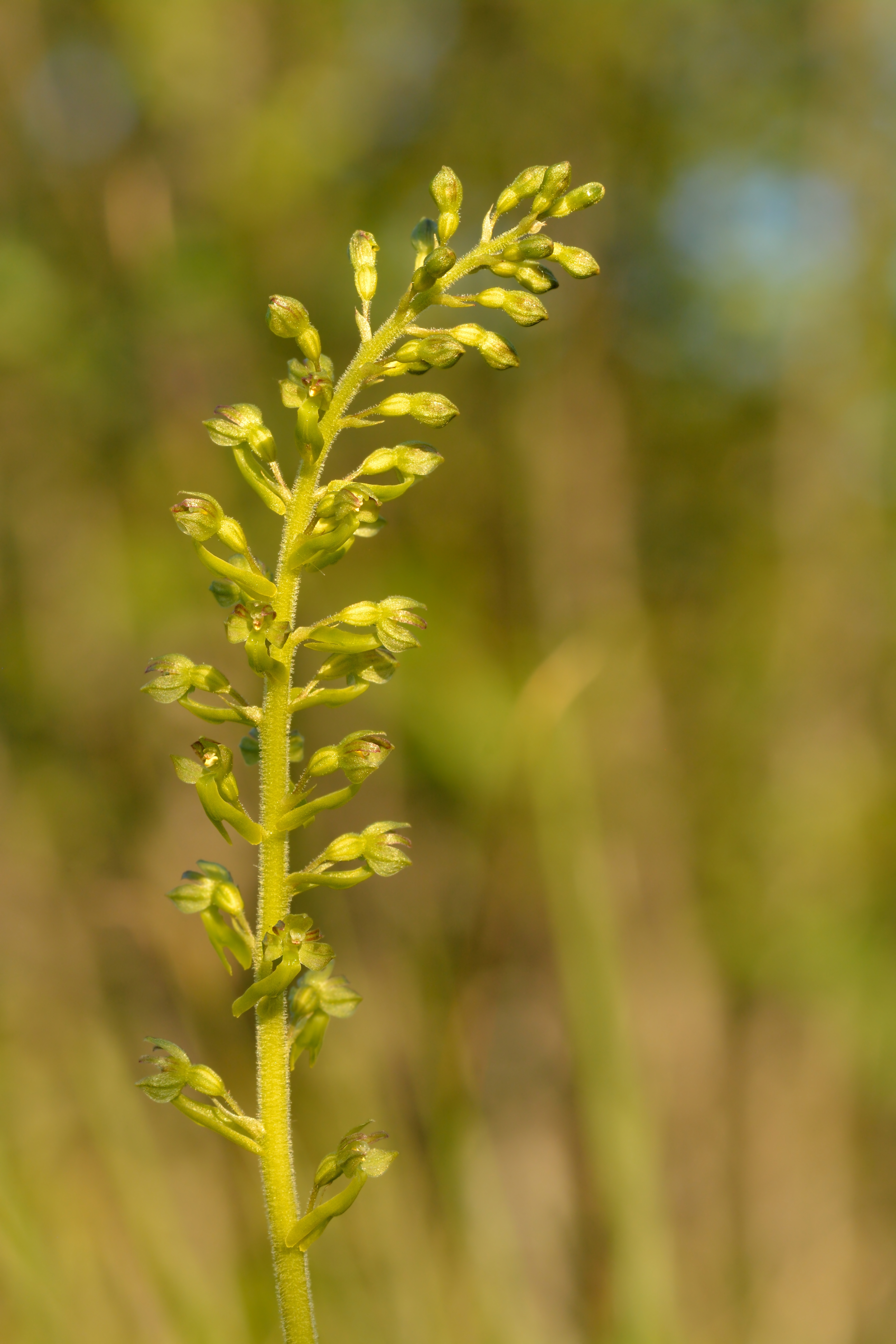
Neottia ovata

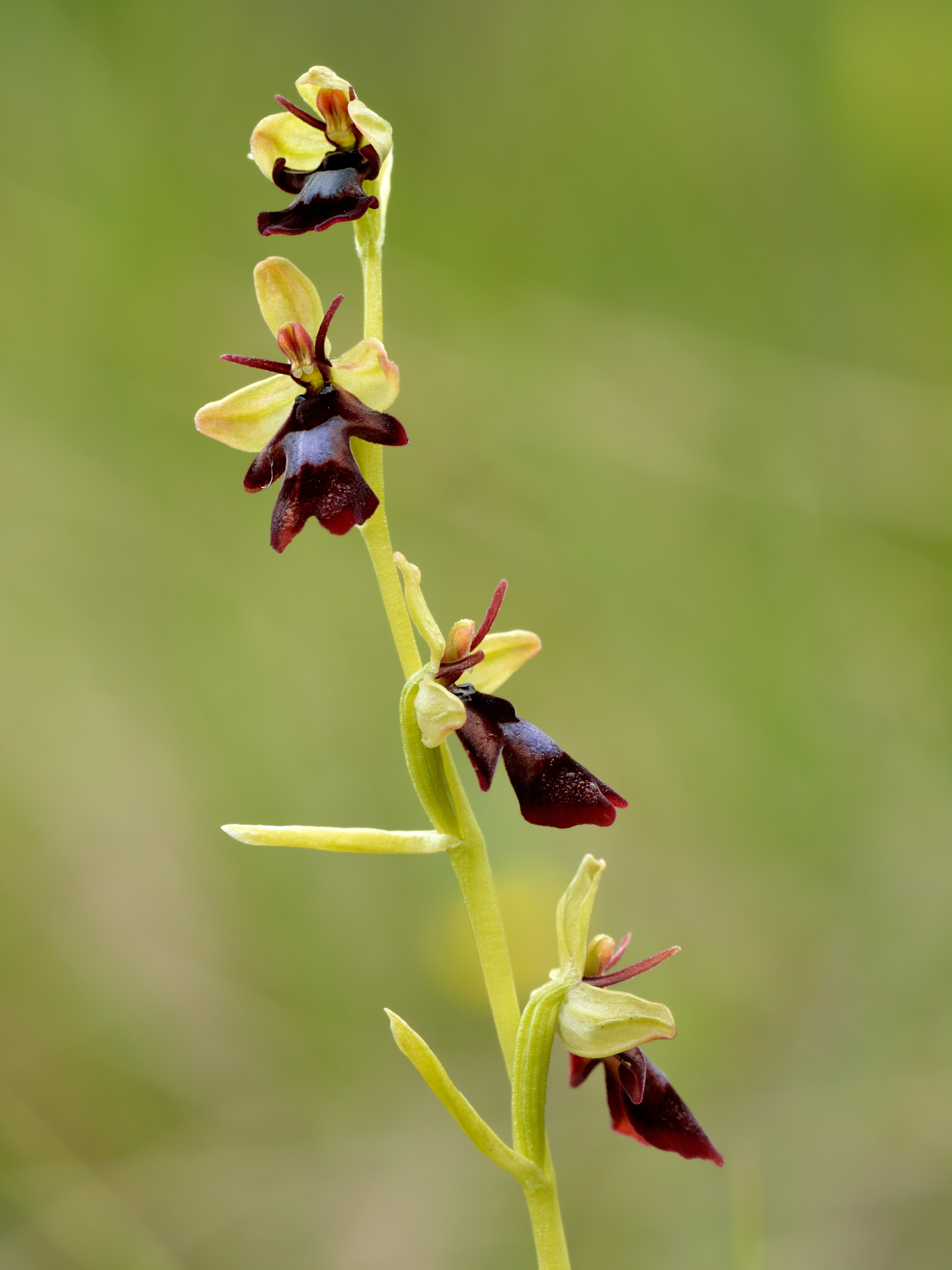
Ophrys insectifera

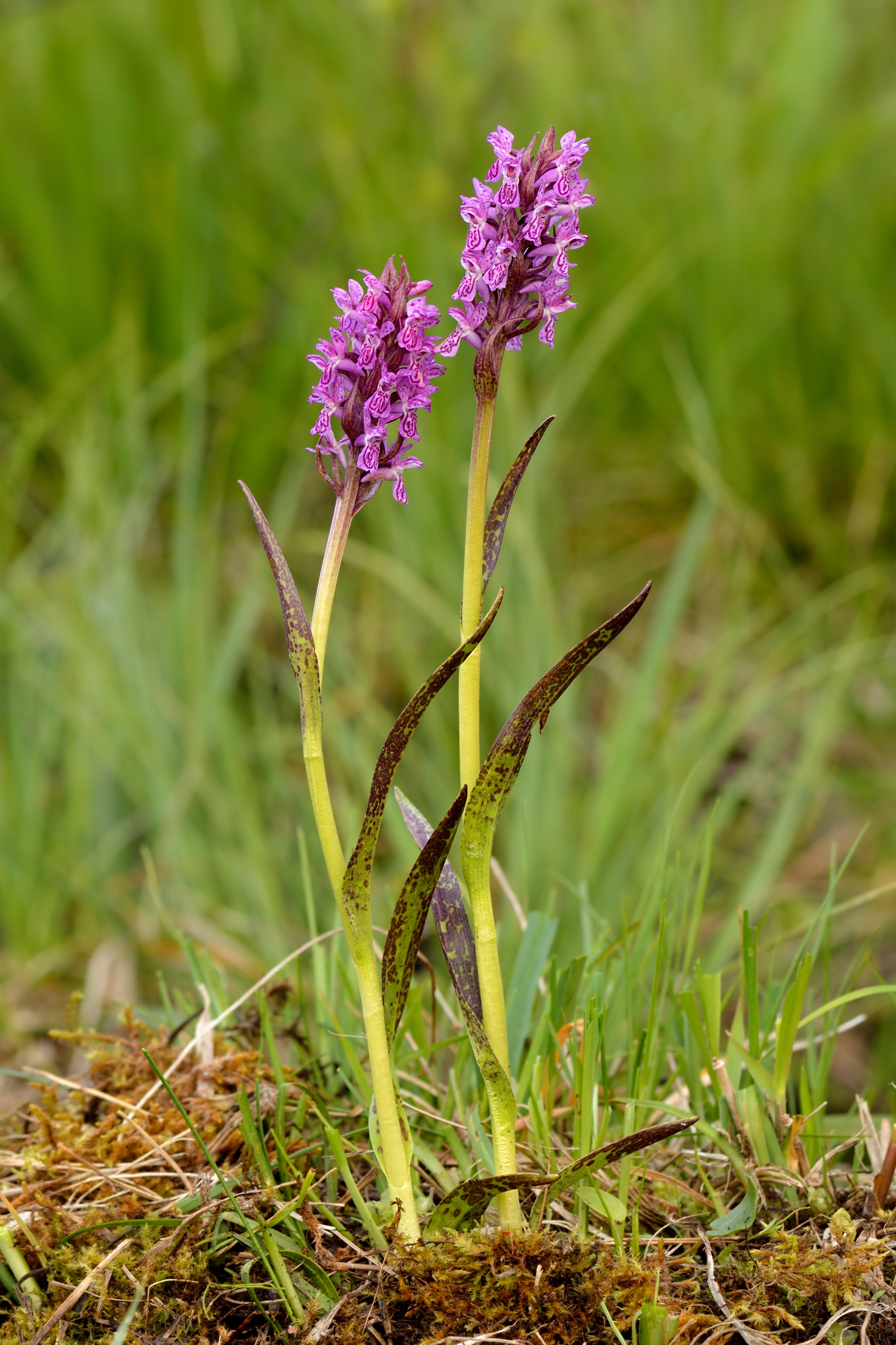
Dactylorhiza incarnata subsp. cruenta
