= Kurevere, Harju County =

Village in Estonia

Kurevere
- Village
- Location within Estonia
- Coordinates: 59°15′00″N 24°50′02″E
- Country: Estonia
- County: Harju County
- Parish: Kiili Parish
- Time zone: UTC+2 (EET)
  - Summer (DST): UTC+3 (EEST)

Kurevere is a village in Kiili Parish, Harju County in northern Estonia.
