= Keila church =

Church building in Estonia

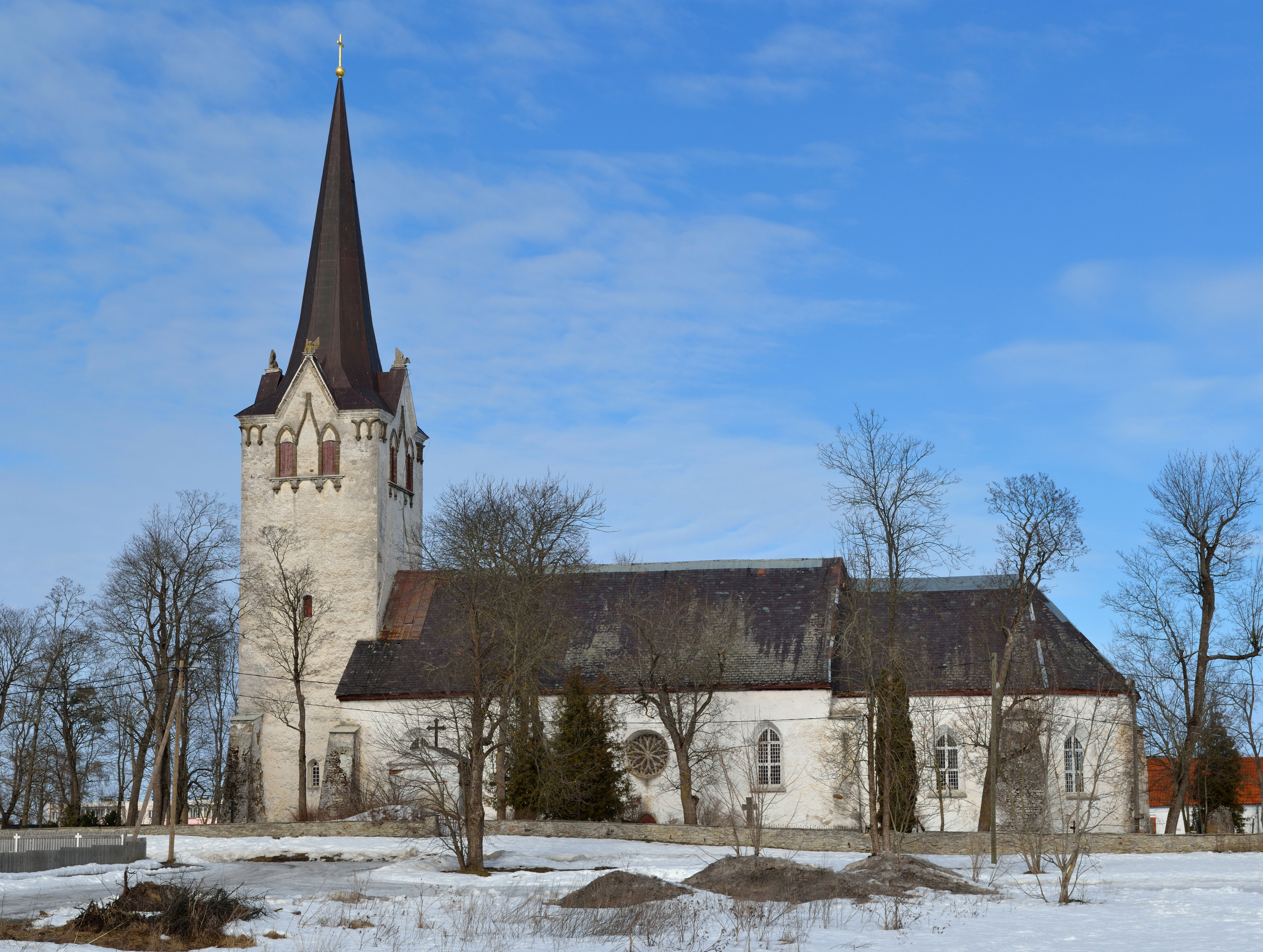
- Keila church
- Keila church
- 59°18′28″N 24°25′47″E
- Location: Keila, Harju county
- Country: Estonia
- Denomination: Lutheran

Keila church (Estonian: Keila kirik) is a Christian church in Keila, Harju county, Estonia. This church is the biggest medieval country church in Harju county. Nowadays, the church is used by Keila congregation of the Estonian Evangelical Lutheran Church.

There is no information, when exactly construction works of the church began. It is known that about 1280, square chapel was built in "Keila hill". The main body of the church was probably built at the beginning of 14th century.

Keila church was destroyed in 1558 during the Livonian War. By the year 1596, the church was restored.

== Gallery ==
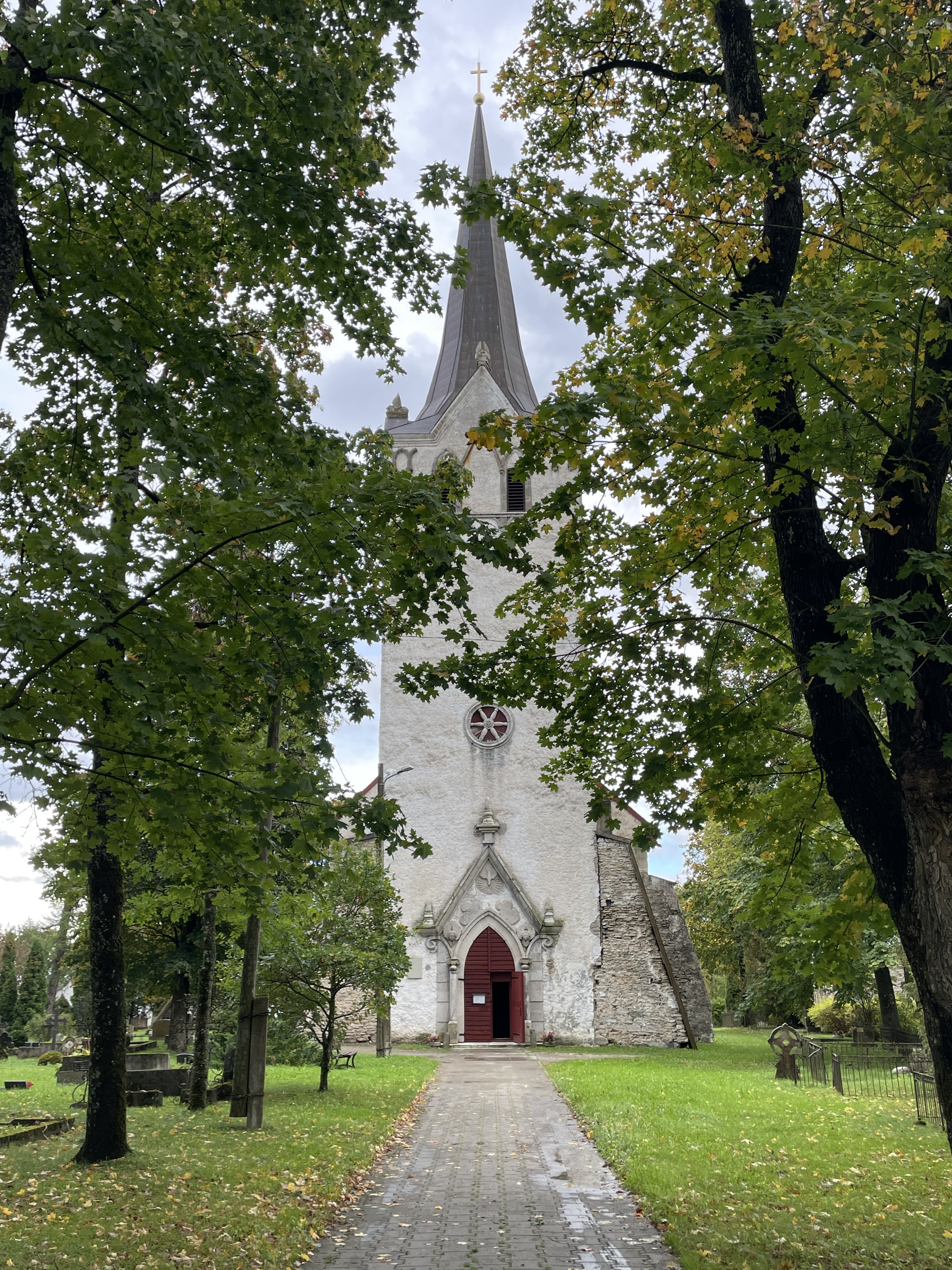
East facade and tower

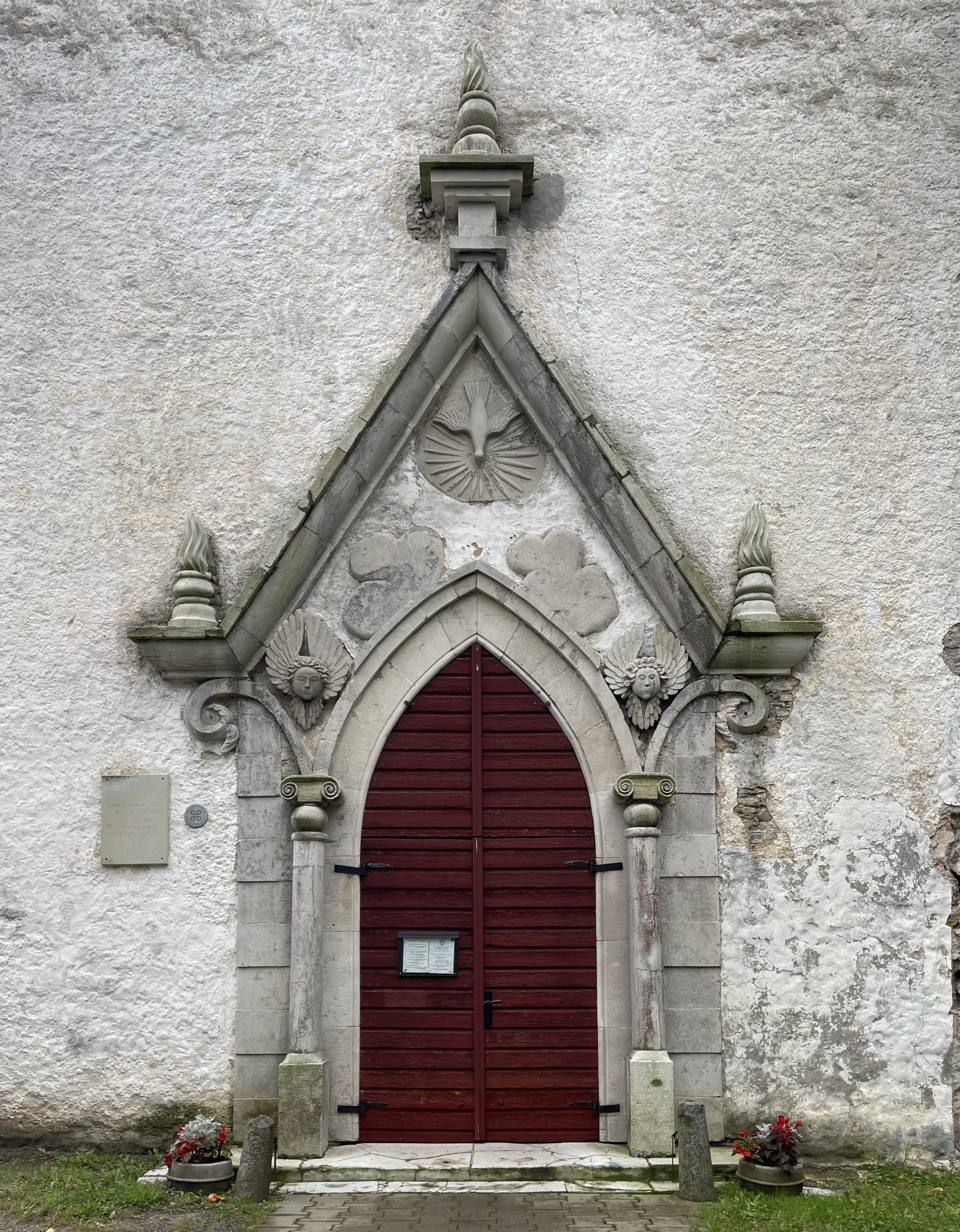
Main portal

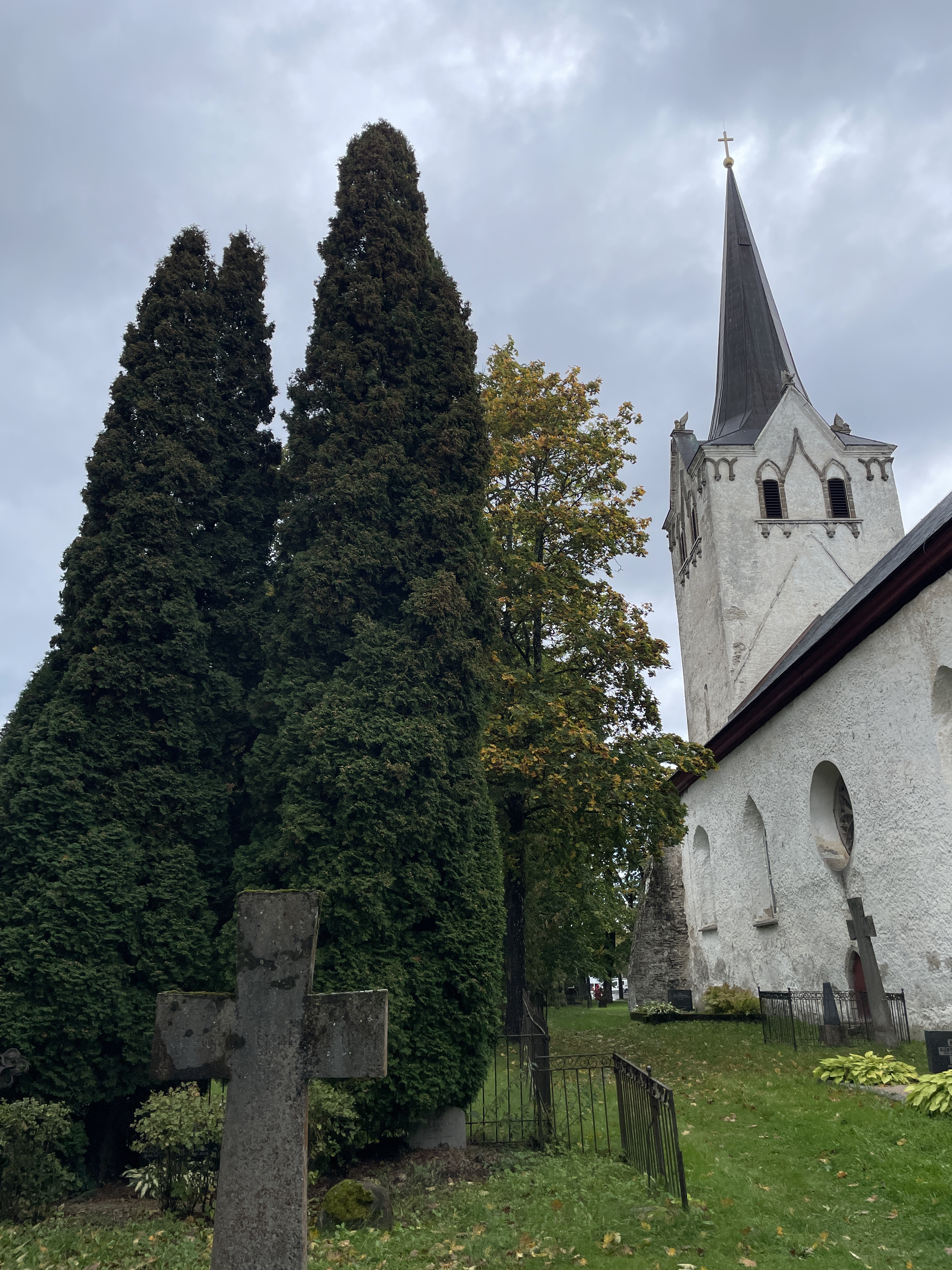
Church garden cemetery

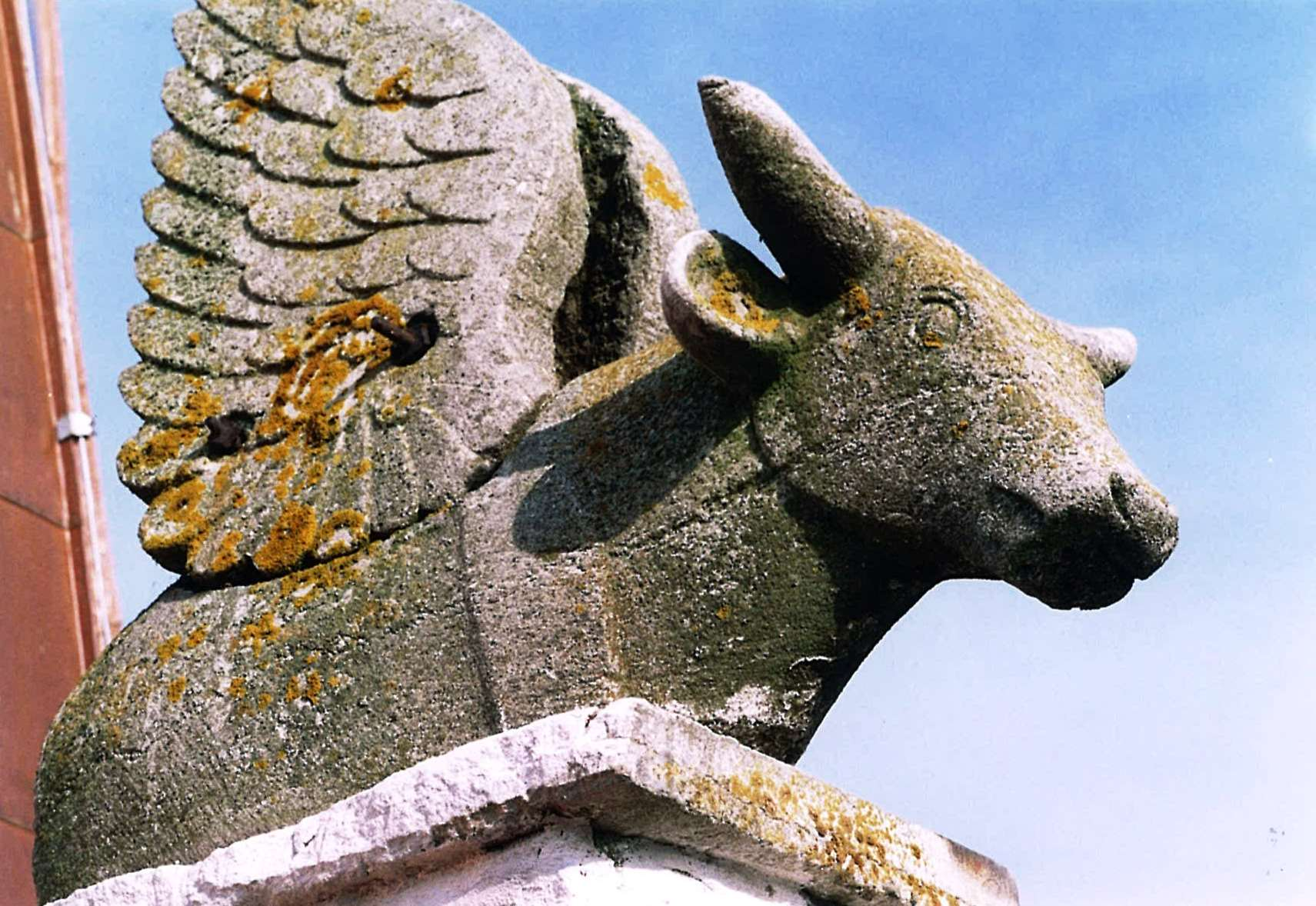
Tower statue
