= Estonian Boxing Association =

Sports governing body in Estonia

- Eesti Poksiliit
- Sport: boxing
- Founded: 1920
- Affiliation: World Boxing
- Affiliation date: 18 February 2025

Official website
- www.eestipoksiliit.ee
- (Estonia)

Estonian Boxing Association (abbreviation EBA; Estonian: Eesti Poksiliit) is one of the sport governing bodies in Estonia which deals with boxing.

EBA is a legal successor of EKRAVE Union (Estonian: Eesti Kerge-, Raske- ja Veespordi Liit) which was established in 1920. EBA is a member of World Boxing.
