= Keila =

Town in Harju County, Estonia

- Town
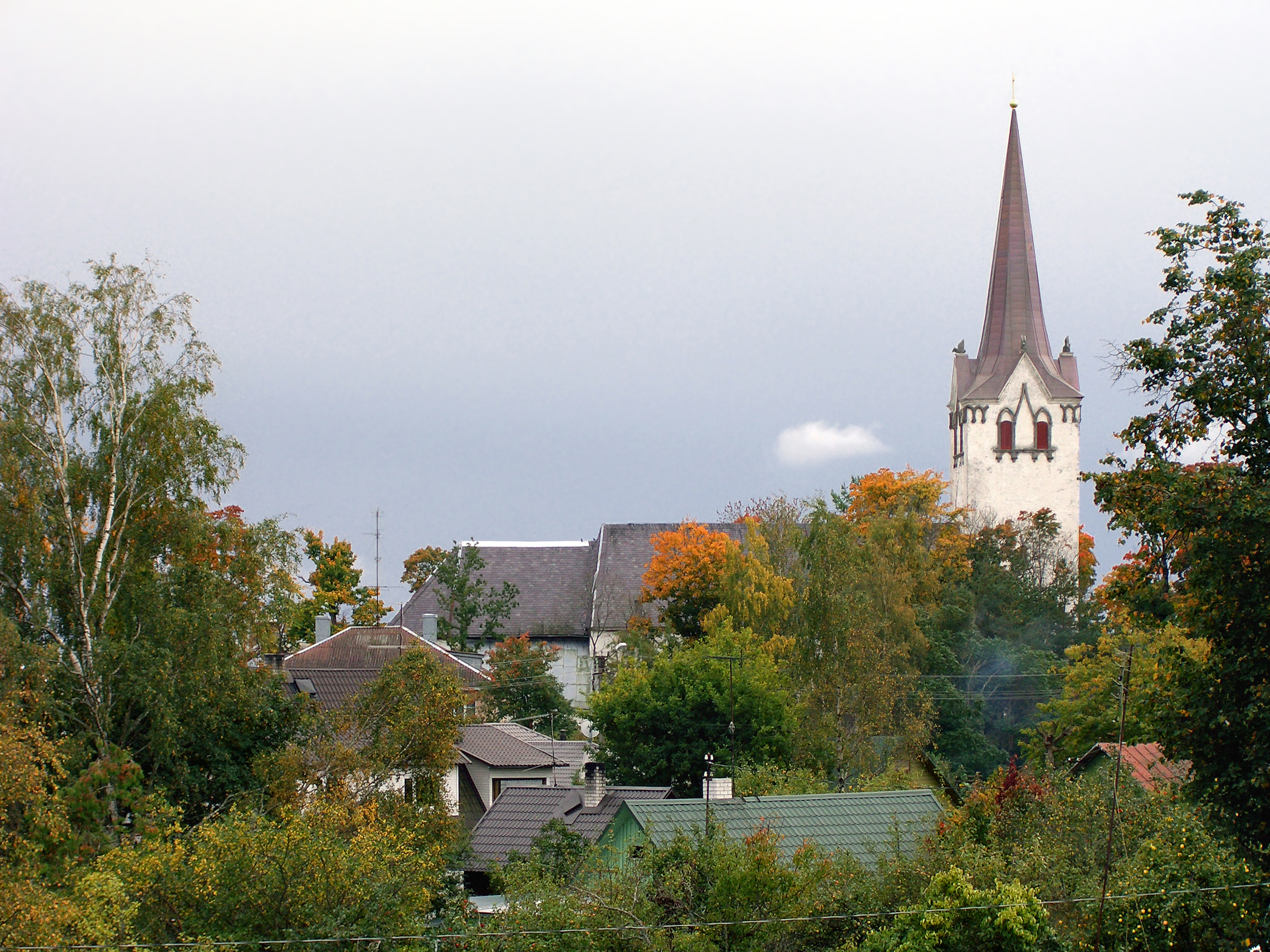
- The older part of Keila with the church

- Flag Coat of arms

- Location in Estonia
- Coordinates: 59°18′31″N 24°25′21″E
- Country: Estonia
- County: Harju County

Government
  - Mayor: Enno Fels

Area
  - Total: 11.25 km^{2} (4.34 sq mi)

Population (2025)
  - Total: 11,024
  - Rank: 15th
  - Density: 979.9/km^{2} (2,538/sq mi)

Ethnicity
  - Estonians: 84.9%
  - Russians: 11%
  - other: 3.9%
- Time zone: UTC+2 (EET)
  - Summer (DST): UTC+3 (EEST)
- ISO 3166 code: EE-296
- Website: www.keila.ee

Keila (Estonian: Keila) is a town and an urban municipality in Harju County in north-western Estonia, 25 km (16 mi) southwest of Tallinn. As of 2025, the town has a population of 11,024 inhabitants.

Keila is also the location of administrative buildings of the surrounding Keila Parish, a rural municipality separate from the town itself.

== History ==
The oldest traces of human settlement in Keila trace back 2000 to 3000 years BC. Around 1000 years ago the village of Keila was established along the Keila river. In 1219, the Danish conquered Northern-Estonia and chose Keila as the site on which the Vomentakæ parochial Revala county church was to be built. The first church was a small wooden structure dedicated primarily to St. Michael which was replaced with a stone church at the end of the 13th century. Subsequently, the first written mention of Keila (Keikŋl) comes from Danish evaluation book writings in 1241.

In the 15th–16th century, a settlement comprising some tens of buildings and a hundred people formed around the church. At the same time the Livonian Order built a small fort south-east of the church on jõesaare (Known today as Jõepark). Ruins of the fort were first excavated in 1976 with continued finds up to 2007. During the Livonian War of 1558–1583 the settlement, including the church (Later restored in 1596), was destroyed. Further hampered by the plague and starvation in 1601–1602 the population decline reduced the community to a small church village. This was to be the case for three centuries.

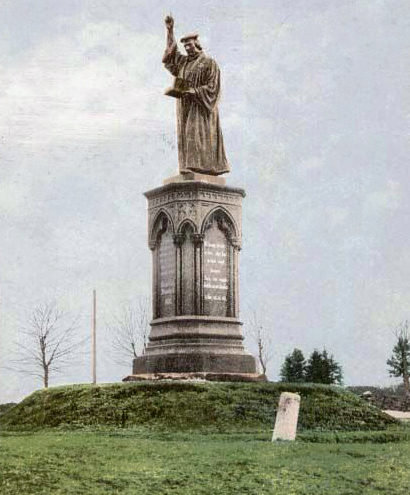
Former Luther monument demolished in 1949

An upturn began in the second half of the 20th century. One of the first notable cultural events was the erection of a statue of Martin Luther in 1862 near the kirikumõis (Church manor). However the statue was completely destroyed in 1949. In 1885, the first song festival was held in Keila. The festival was composed of 19 choirs and supervised by Konstantin Türnpu from Klooga. In 1867, the first school was opened in Väljaotsa farm celebrating the start of education in Keila. The development of Keila took a turn with the establishment of the Tallinn–Paldiski railway line in 1870. After the railway to Keila was built, the place became known—as a pun—as Kegelbahn (German for 'bowling alley').

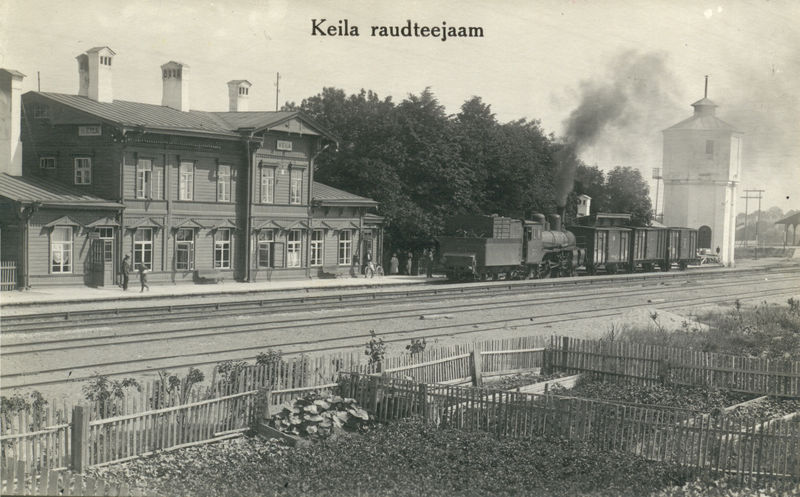
Keila railway station in 1931

Keila officially became a town on 1 May 1938.

=== Military base ===
During Soviet times a military base, known as Tankipolk 'Tank Regiment', was built on the outskirts of the town for the housing of soldiers and tanks. The base was demolished a few years after the Soviet army left the country. Years later, a residential district was built on the site of the base. The woodland areas around it have also been cleaned up and turned into paved, and partially lit, paths. During winter, the area acts as a skiing track with many hills and paths. The paths range from 3 to 7 kilometres (1.9 to 4.3 miles) in length. The largest of the hills is known as Tankimägi 'Tank Hill'. As of 2009, no more than a few building foundations remain of the base.

== Geography ==
The city is situated largely on a big hill known as Keila hill and on the valley of Keila River. On the westernmost side of Keila there is Niitvälja Bog.

454 million year old limestone, which can be seen outcropping in the city, is known as Keila stage. This name was given by Carl Friedrich Schmidt to distinguish layer of limestone, that is located between Jõhvi and Vasalemma stage.

== Demographics ==
=== Population ===
According to the 1 July 2011 Census, the population was 10030.

According to the 2011 Census, the population was 10,014.

According to the 2009 Census, the population was 9,873.

=== Ethnic composition ===
According to the 2021 Census, 85.1% were Estonians, 9.76% Russians, 2.51% Ukrainians, 0.55% Belarusians, 0.38% Finns, 0.27 Lithuanians, 0.1% Poles, 0.1% Tatars, 0.1% Germans and 0.1% Latvians.

Ethnic composition 1922-2021
Ethnicity	1922		1934		1941		1959		1970		1979		1989		2000		2011		2021	
Ethnicity	amount	%	amount	%	amount	%	amount	%	amount	%	amount	%	amount	%	amount	%	amount	%	amount	%
Estonians	772	97.8	939	96.9	1057	98.8	2583	85.2	4621	82.9	5573	77.5	7094	70.4	7773	82.8	8291	84.9	8935	85.1
Russians	8	1.01	14	1.44	11	1.03	-	-	673	12.1	1191	16.6	2177	21.6	1133	12.1	1078	11.0	1025	9.76
Ukrainians	-	-	0	0.00	-	-	-	-	79	1.42	116	1.61	299	2.97	166	1.77	139	1.42	264	2.51
Belarusians	-	-	-	-	-	-	-	-	40	0.72	60	0.83	111	1.10	64	0.68	53	0.54	58	0.55
Finns	-	-	0	0.00	0	0.00	-	-	88	1.58	105	1.46	115	1.14	84	0.89	56	0.57	40	0.38
Jews	0	0.00	1	0.10	0	0.00	-	-	6	0.11	5	0.07	13	0.13	1	0.01	1	0.01	0	0.00
Latvians	-	-	5	0.52	0	0.00	-	-	15	0.27	11	0.15	16	0.16	7	0.07	5	0.05	8	0.08
Germans	4	0.51	8	0.83	-	-	-	-	-	-	18	0.25	23	0.23	7	0.07	10	0.10	12	0.11
Tatars	-	-	0	0.00	-	-	-	-	-	-	31	0.43	43	0.43	8	0.09	7	0.07	5	0.05
Poles	-	-	2	0.21	0	0.00	-	-	-	-	8	0.11	14	0.14	10	0.11	8	0.08	9	0.09
Lithuanians	-	-	0	0.00	0	0.00	-	-	20	0.36	23	0.32	24	0.24	23	0.24	24	0.25	18	0.17
unknown	0	0.00	0	0.00	0	0.00	0	0.00	0	0.00	0	0.00	0	0.00	30	0.32	6	0.06	28	0.27
other	5	0.63	0	0.00	2	0.19	449	14.8	32	0.57	53	0.74	143	1.42	82	0.87	85	0.87	95	0.90
Total	789	100	969	100	1070	100	3032	100	5574	100	7194	100	10072	100	9388	100	9763	100	10499	99.98

=== Religious composition ===
Religion in Keila Parish (2021)
1. Unaffiliated (77.2%)
2. Lutheran (10.3%)
3. Orthodox (8.40%)
4. Baptism (1.40%)
5. Catholic (1.20%)
6. Others Christians & non Christian Religion (1.00%)

== Arts and culture ==
=== Museums ===
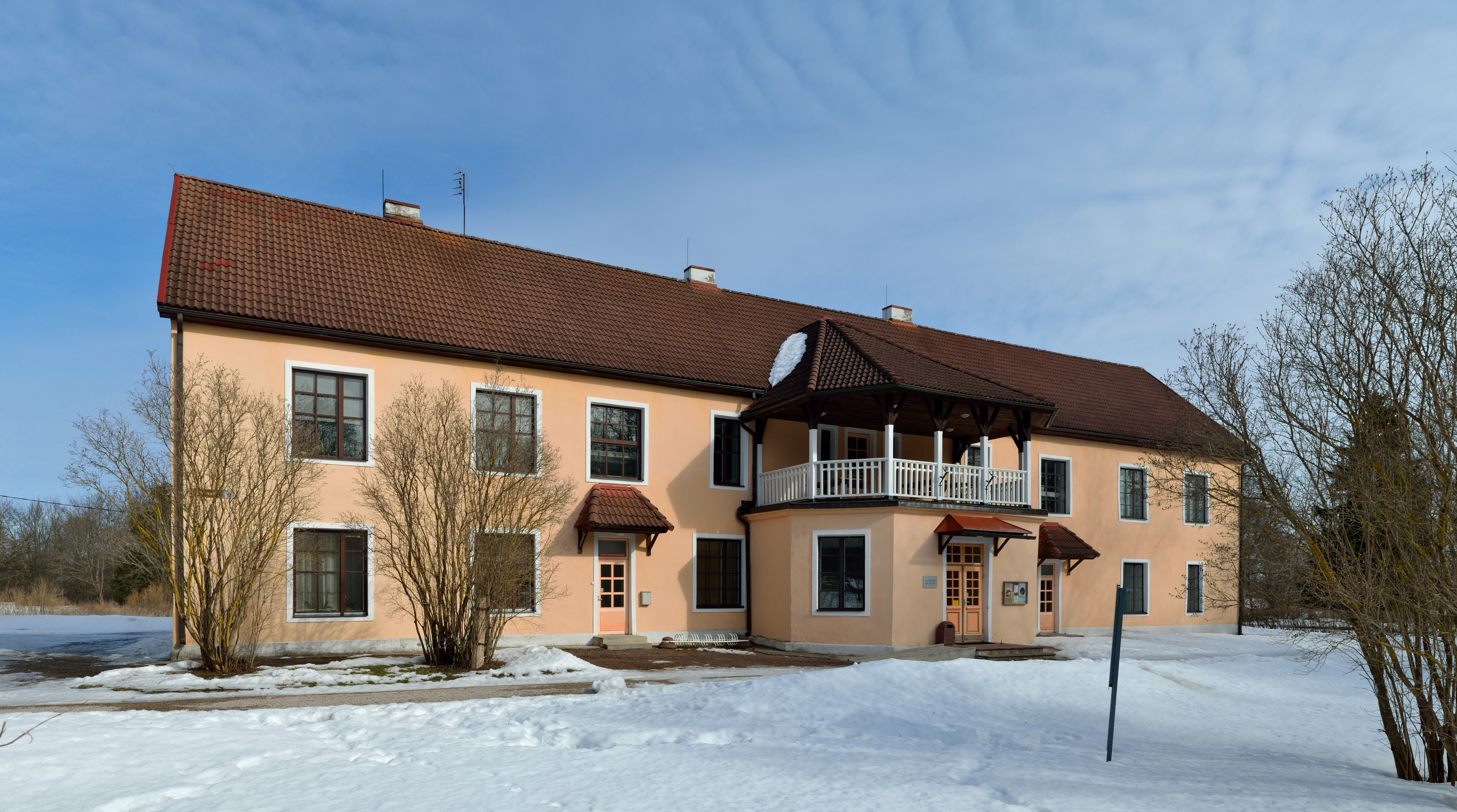
The Harju County Museum in the historic Keila manor house.

The Harju County Museum is located in Keila and opened in 1988. The museum documents the life of Harju County throughout history and is located in the historic Keila manor house (German: Gutshaus Kegel).

== Education ==
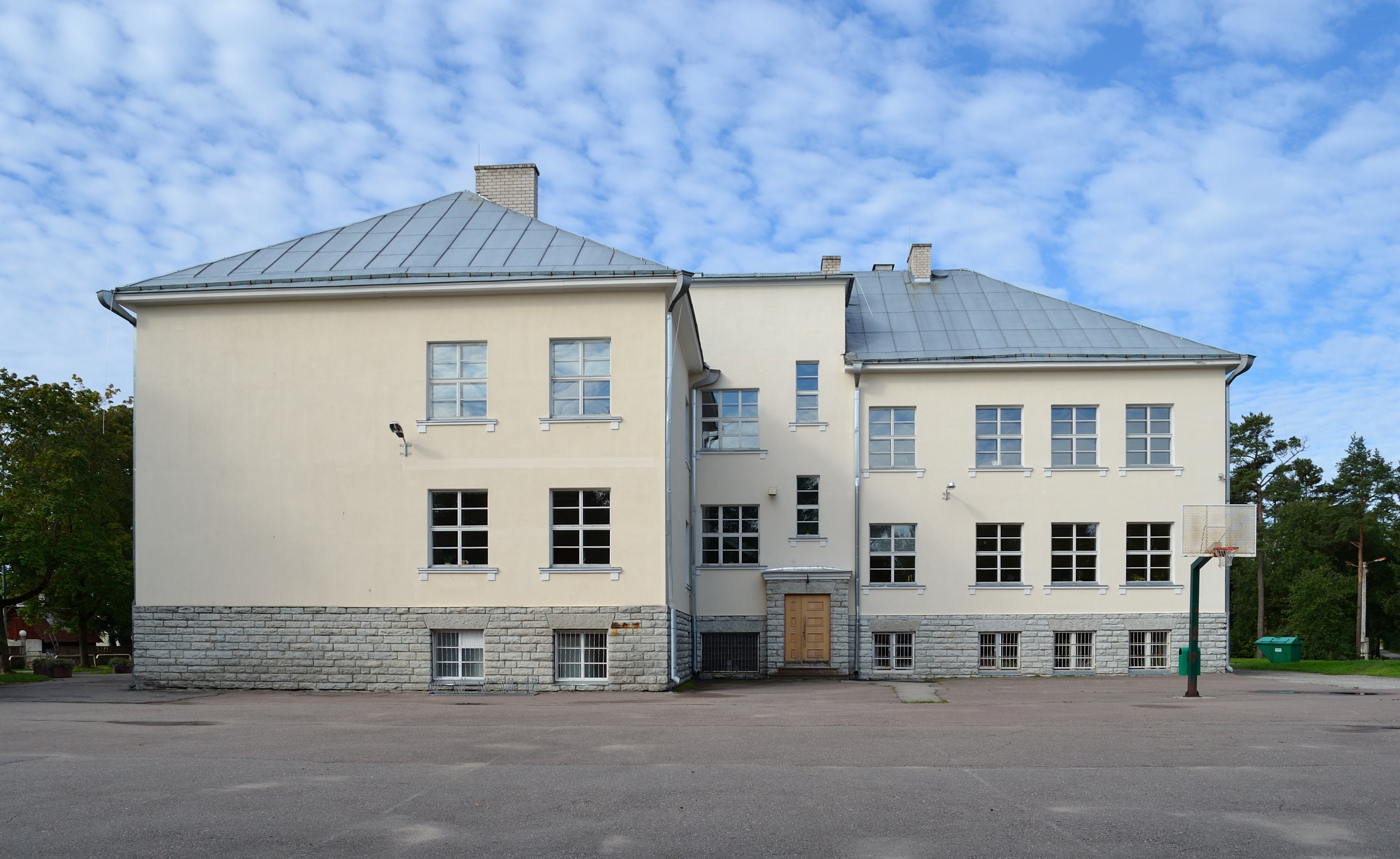
Elementary school

There are several schools in Keila.

- Keila High School
- Keila Joint High School
- Keila Music School

and three kindergartens.

== Transport and infrastructure ==
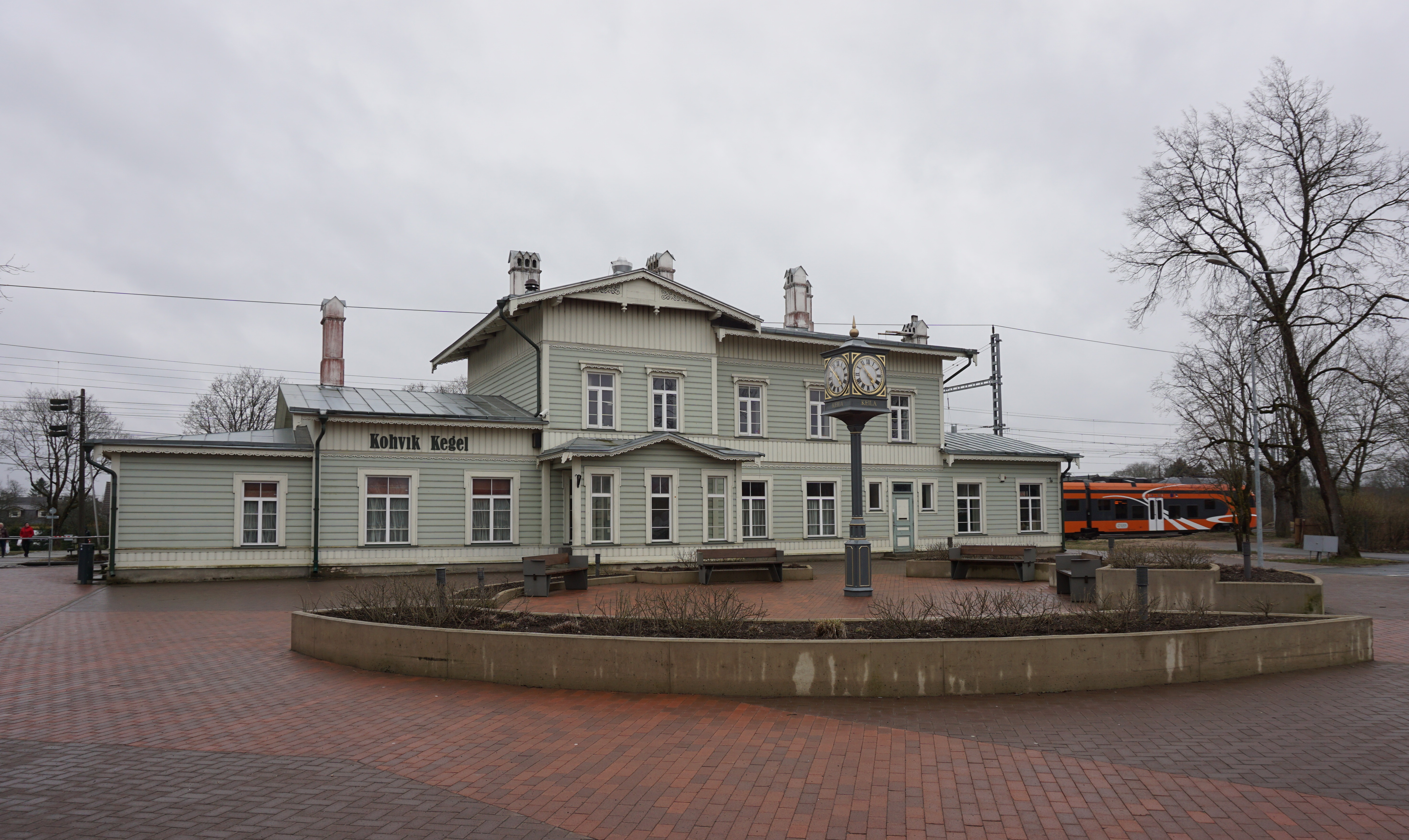
Keila railway station

Keila is served by Keila railway station located on the railway line between Tallinn and Paldiski / Turba. The station is served by Tallinn's commuter rail network, an electrified commuter rail network operated by Elron, linking the city of Tallinn with its suburbs and the surrounding countryside.

== International relations ==
=== Twin towns — sister cities ===
Keila is twinned with:

- (Georgia (country)) Chiatura, Georgia
- Nacka, Sweden
- Huittinen, Finland
- Kerava, Finland
- Barsbüttel, Germany
- Sigulda, Latvia
- Birštonas, Lithuania

== Notable residents ==
- Jekaterina Golovatenko (born 1979), figure skater
- Ülo Jõgi (1921–2007), war historian and national activist
- Astrid Lepa (1924–2015), actress and director
- Nublu (born 1996), rapper
- Pearu Paulus (born 1967), singer and composer
- Robert Rägastik (1902–1959), geographer and educator
- Ago Silde (born 1963), politician
- Siiri Sisask (born 1968), singer and politician
- Kärt Tomingas (1967–2025), singer and actress
- Peeter Volkonski (born 1954), actor, rock-musician and composer
- Oleksandr Yakymenko (born 1964), politician, former head of the Security Service of Ukraine
- Imre Taveter (1967-2026), sailor

== Gallery ==
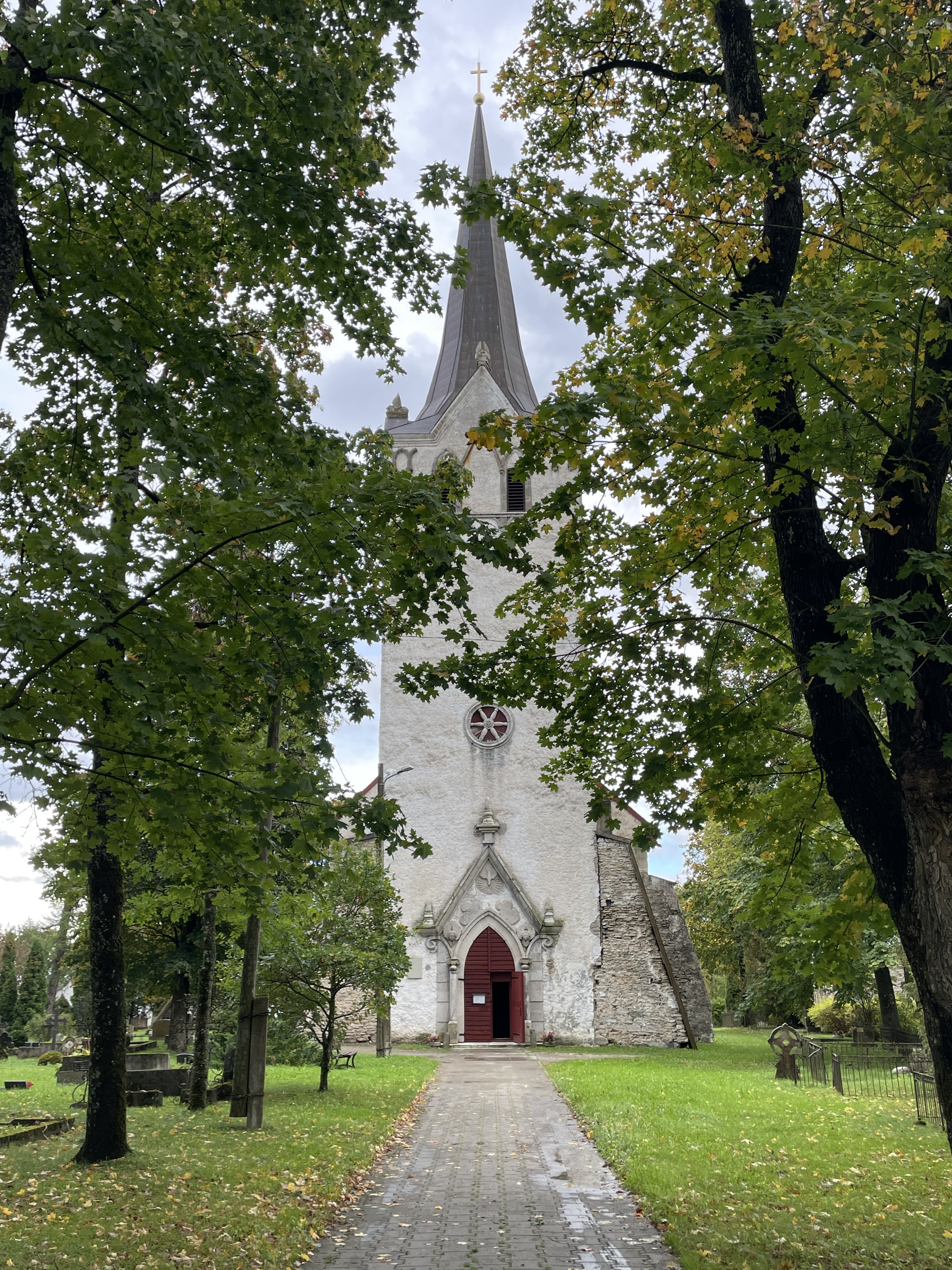
Parish church

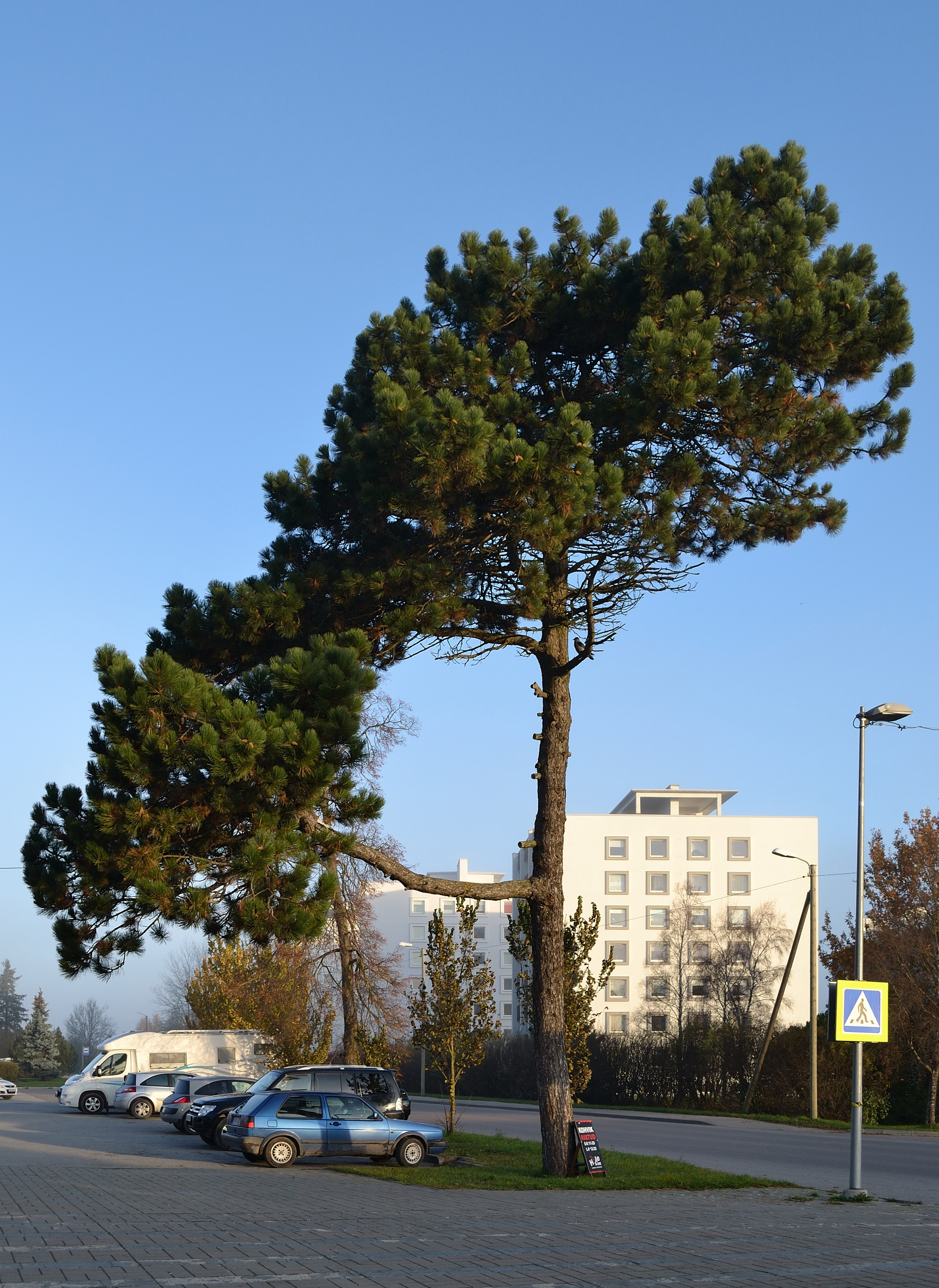
Cultivated Pinus nigra in Keila

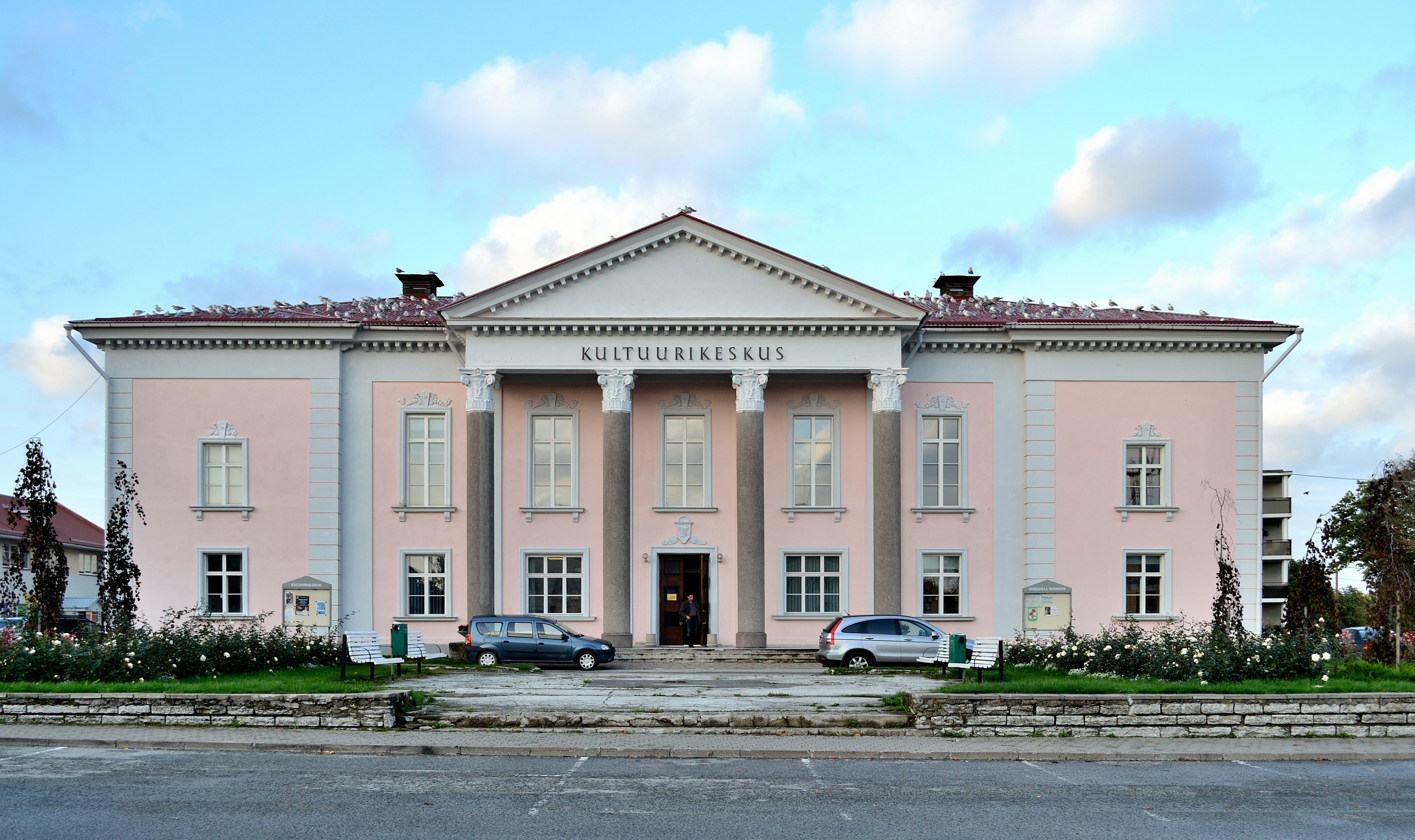
Cultural Centre

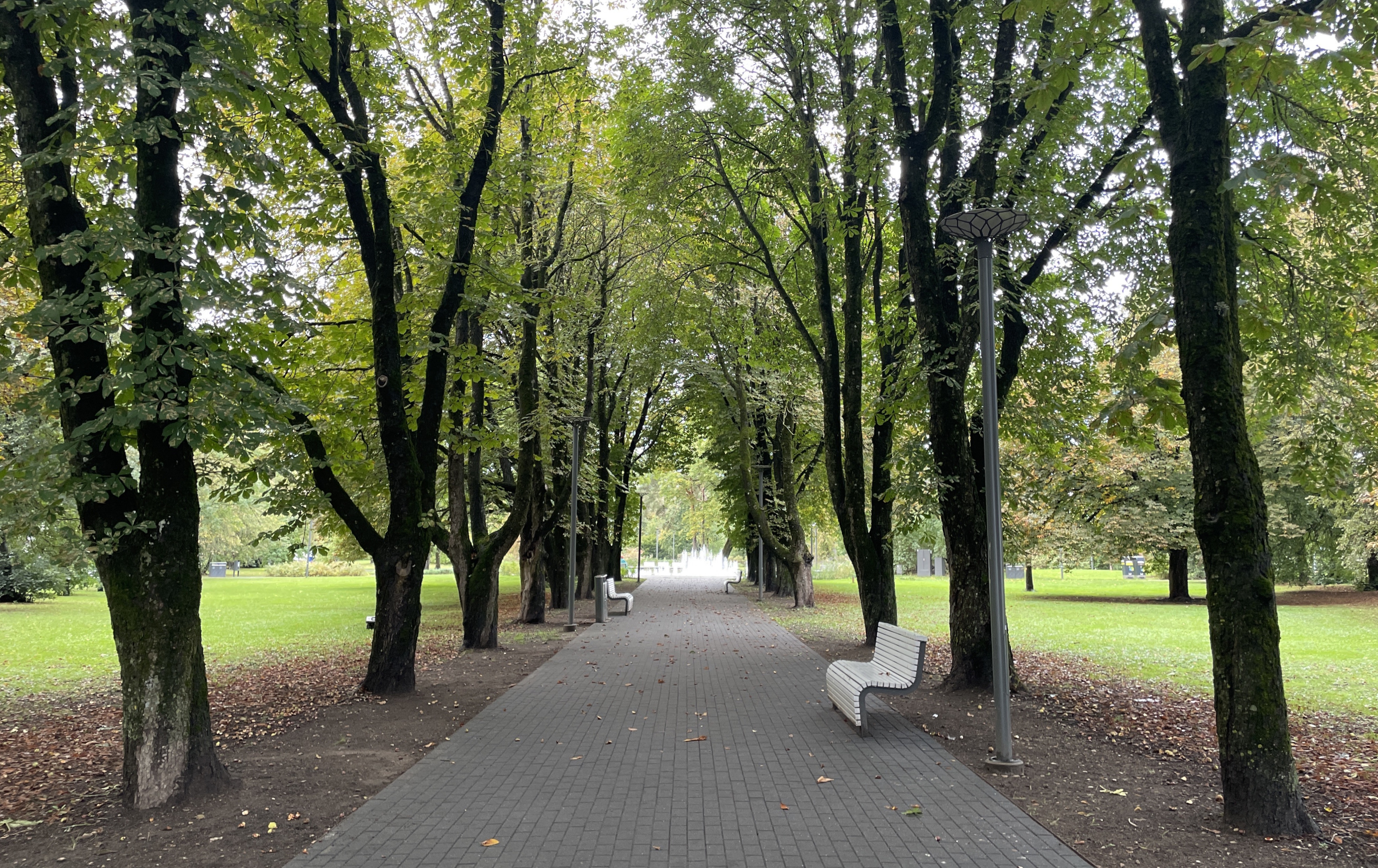
Central Park

== See also ==
- Keila JK
