= Nabala =

Village in Estonia

- Village
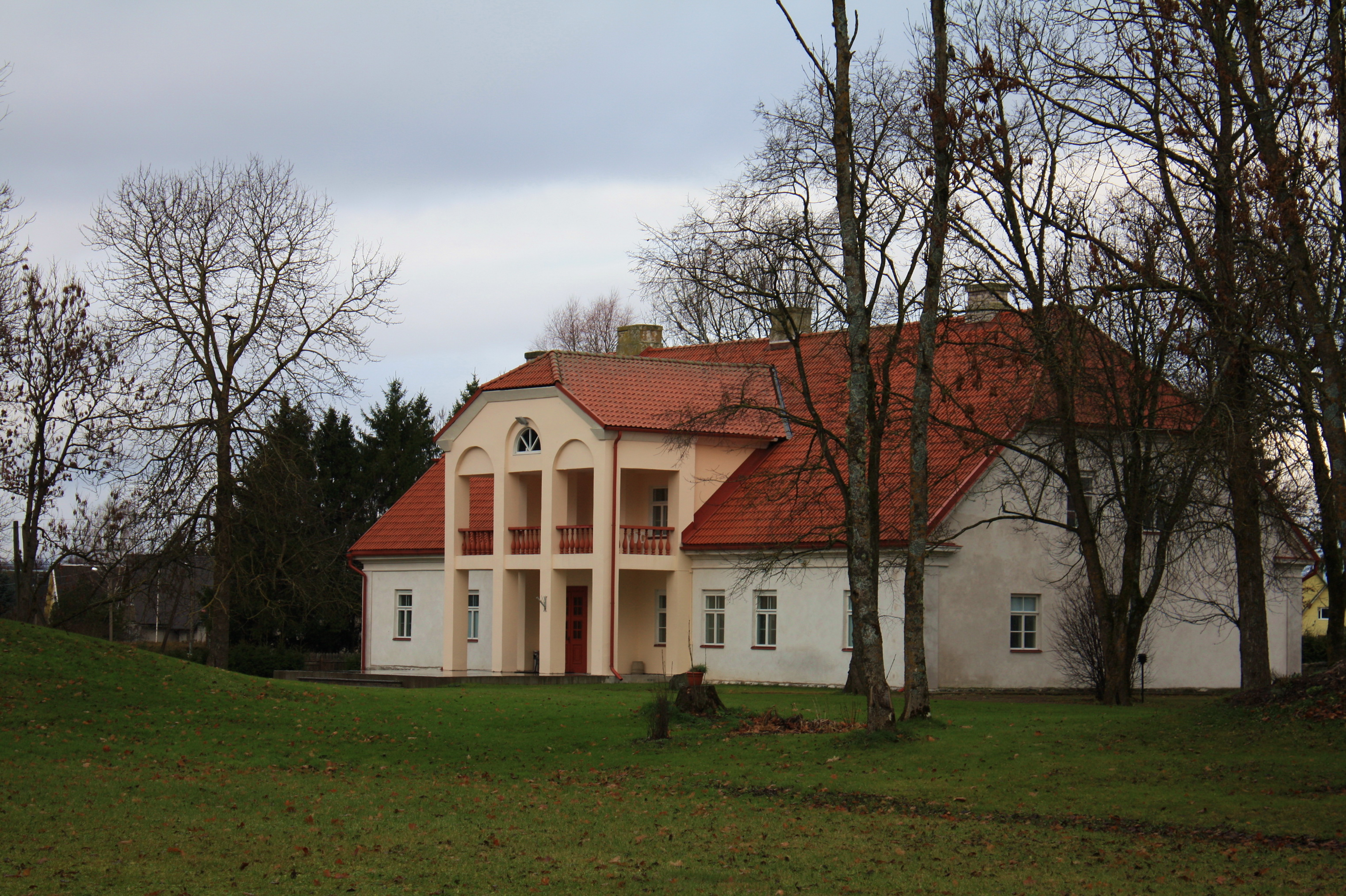
- Nabala Manor

- Location in Estonia
- Coordinates: 59°16′24″N 24°52′22″E
- Country: Estonia
- County: Harju County
- Municipality: Kiili Parish

Population (2009)
  - Total: 147

Nabala (German: Nappel) is a village in Kiili Parish, Harju County, in northern Estonia, located about 20 km (12 mi) southeast of Tallinn. It has a population of 147 (as of 2009).

Estonian largest karst area (80.8 km²) is located around Nabala.
