= Sõmeru, Kiili Parish =

Village in Kiili Parish, Harju County, Estonia

Coordinates: 59°14′41″N 24°53′56″E

Sõmeru
- Village
- Interactive map of Sõmeru
- Country: Estonia
- County: Harju County
- Parish: Kiili Parish
- Time zone: UTC+2 (EET)
  - Summer (DST): UTC+3 (EEST)

Sõmeru is a village in Kiili Parish, Harju County in northern Estonia.
