= Kiili Parish =

Municipality of Estonia

Coordinates: 59.3°N 24.833333°E

Kiili Parish Kiili vald
- Municipality of Estonia
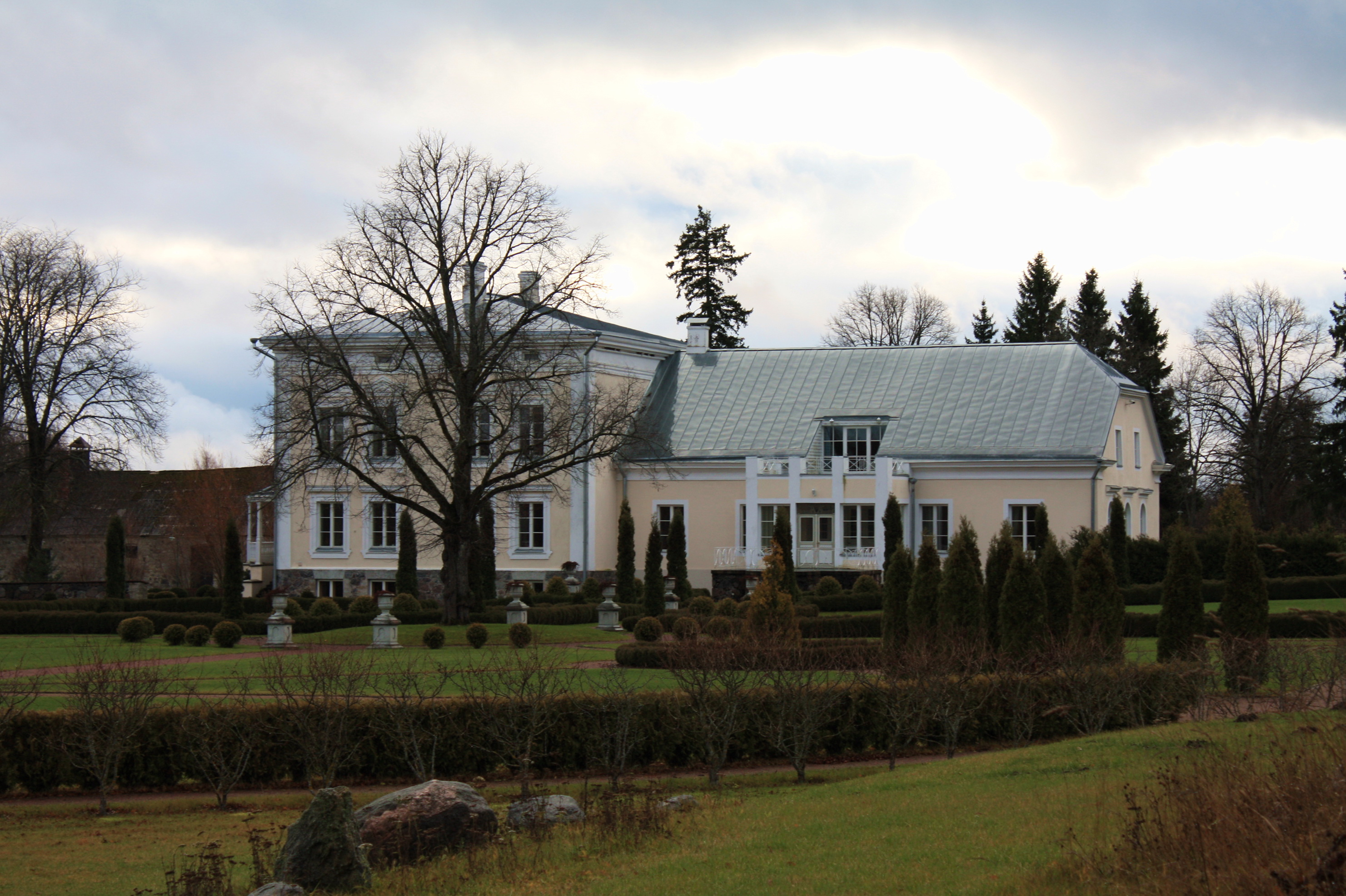
- Sausti Manor

- Flag Coat of arms

- Kiili Parish within Harju County.
- Country: Estonia
- County: Harju County
- Administrative centre: Kiili

Government
  - Mayor: Aimur Liiva

Area
  - Total: 100.4 km^{2} (38.8 sq mi)

Population (2026)
  - Total: 7,360
  - Density: 73.3/km^{2} (190/sq mi)
- ISO 3166 code: EE-305
- Website: www.kiilivald.ee

Kiili Parish (Estonian: Kiili vald) is a rural municipality of Harju County in northwestern Estonia, south of the national capital, Tallinn. Its population was 7,360 as of 1 January 2026 and its area is 100.4 km^{2} (38.8 mi^{2}). Its population density is 73.3/km^{2} (189.9/sq mi).

The administrative centre of Kiili Parish is Kiili borough, population 1,492 (as of 2015). Its two smaller boroughs are Kangru and Luige. Its 13 villages are Arusta, Kurevere, Lähtse, Metsanurga, Mõisaküla, Nabala, Paekna, Piissoo, Sausti, Sookaera, Sõgula, Sõmeru and Vaela.

== Demographics ==
As of 1 January 2026, the parish had 7,360 residents, of which 3,645 (49.5%) were women and 3,715 (50.5%) were men.

=== Religion ===
As of 2022, 84% of the parishioners are unaffiliated with a religion and about 13% are Christian (mostly Lutheran).
