= Madis Milling =

Estonian actor, media personality, and politician (1970–2022)

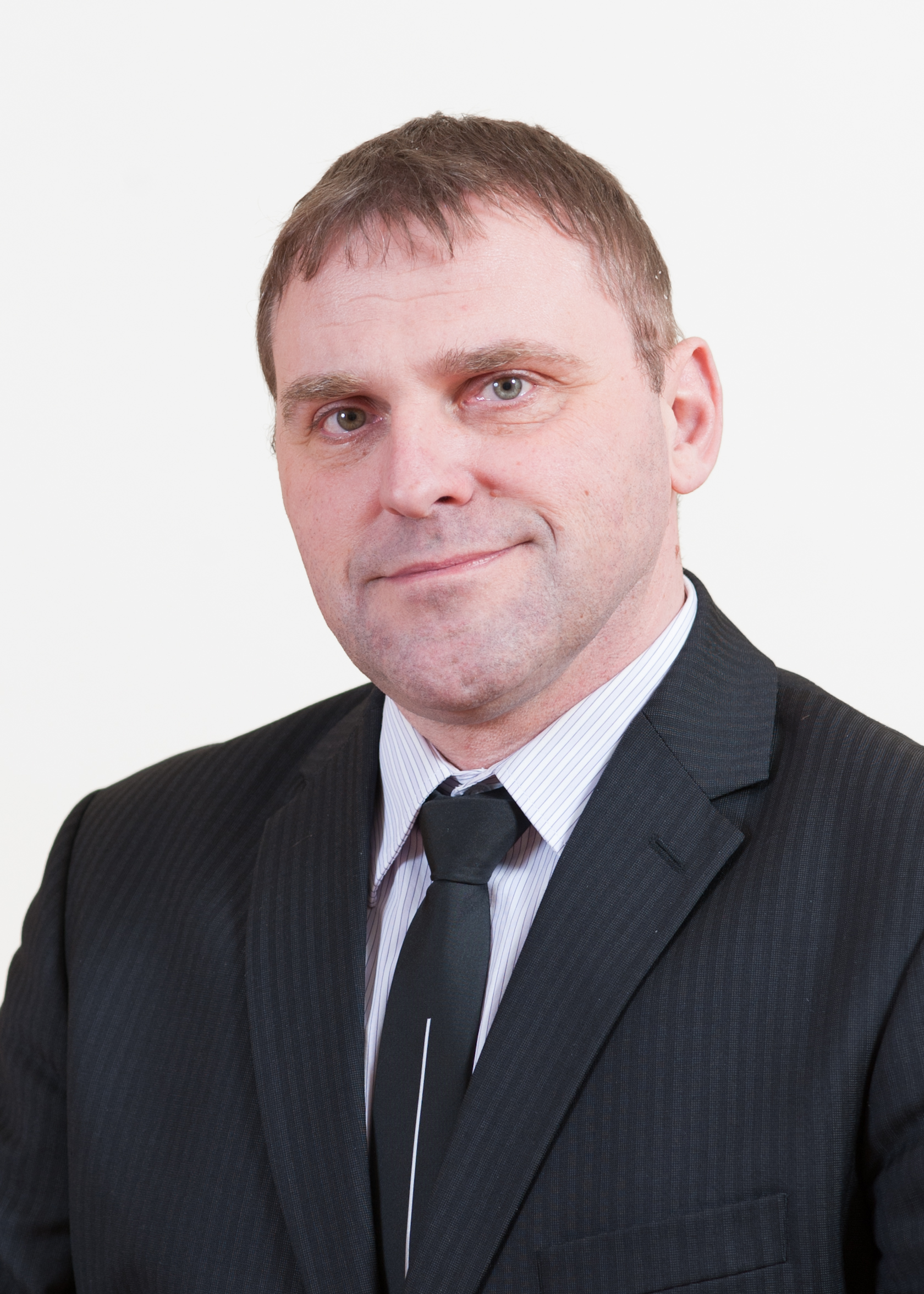
- Born: 24 November 1970; Tallinn, then part of Estonian SSR, Soviet Union
- Died: 3 February 2022 (aged 51); Lokuti, Saku Parish, Estonia
- Resting place: Metsakalmistu, Tallinn
- Occupations: Actor, television and radio presenter and politician
- Political party: Estonian Reform Party

Madis Milling (24 November 1970 – 3 February 2022) was an Estonian actor, comedian, television and radio presenter, volunteer rescue worker, and politician. He was a member of the Estonian Defence League since 1990, in 2011 he was ranked as a lieutenant.

== Life and career ==
In 1993, Milling graduated from Tallinn University as a theatre director. Milling was well known for his role of Valdur Põld in the Eesti Televisioon (ETV) and later TV3 comedy series Vanad ja kobedad from 2000 until 2007, and the 2003 film Vanad ja kobedad saavad jalad alla based on the series.

He was a host on several radio stations, including Sky Plus, Vikerraadio, and Radio Kuku. He had performed on comedy tours with Pille Pürg and Henrik Normann since 2005. From 2006 until 2013, he played the role of Mart Kukk in the Kanal 2 crime-drama television series Kelgukoerad. In 2010, he was co-presenter of the TV3 musical competition series Laulud tähtedega with singer Eda-Ines Etti.

From 2003, he was a member of the Estonian Reform Party. He was a member of the XIII Riigikogu and XIV Riigikogu.

Milling died on 3 February 2022, at the age of 51. He had been responding to a fire as a volunteer rescue worker in the village of Lokuti in Saku Municipality and collapsed suddenly after the rescue operation from an undisclosed medical condition. On 7 February 2022, Milling was posthumously awarded the Order of the Cross of the Eagle by President of Estonia Alar Karis. Milling's funeral was held at St. John's Church, Tallinn on 10 February 2022. He was buried in Tallinn's Forest Cemetery on 12 February.
