= Tänassilma =

Tänassilma may refer to several places in Estonia:

- Tänassilma, Harju County, village in Saku Parish, Harju County
- Tänassilma, Viljandi County, village in Viljandi Parish, Viljandi County

== See also ==
- Tännassilma (disambiguation)
