= Männiku training area =

Military training area in Estonia

Männiku harjutusväli Männiku training area
- Near Tallinn in Estonia

Site information
- Type: military training area
- Operator: Estonian Defence Forces
- Status: active

Location
- Coordinates: 59°21′N 24°42′E
- Area: 1,246.6 ha (3,080 acres)

Site history
- In use: 2008

Männiku training area is one of the six military training fields used by the Estonian Defence Forces. It is located just outside the capital of Estonia, Tallinn, in Saku Parish. Most of its territory of 1,246 ha (3,080 acres) is within the borders of the village of Männiku, and a small portion of the village of Tammemäe is also included.

== History ==
During the Soviet occupation of Estonia, Männiku training area was used by the Soviet Army, its area was 1173 ha.

=== Establishment ===
Männiku training area was established on 11 September 2008, with the Government Order No. 394 "Establishment of the Defense Forces Männiku training area."

== See also ==
- Keskpolügoon
