= High-speed rail in Latvia =

Current plans call for a high-speed Rail Baltica that will connect the Latvian capital Riga with Pärnu and Tallinn to the north and with Kaunas and Warsaw to the south. Reports in March 2011 indicate plans are moving towards a standard gauge railway.

The project will be financed by the budget of Latvia (50%) and by the European Union TEN-T budget, Structural and Cohesion Funds provided to the EU New Member States.

Railways currently have a low number of passengers along the north-south route in Latvia. If the north-south going railways are converted to standard gauge, the west-east railways are still not likely to be converted, since they are used for freight and passenger trains to Russia and Belarus.

There was also a consideration to build a new west-east high-speed railway Riga–Moscow.
