= Metsanurme =

Village in Estonia

Coordinates: 59°15′59″N 24°39′49″E

- Village
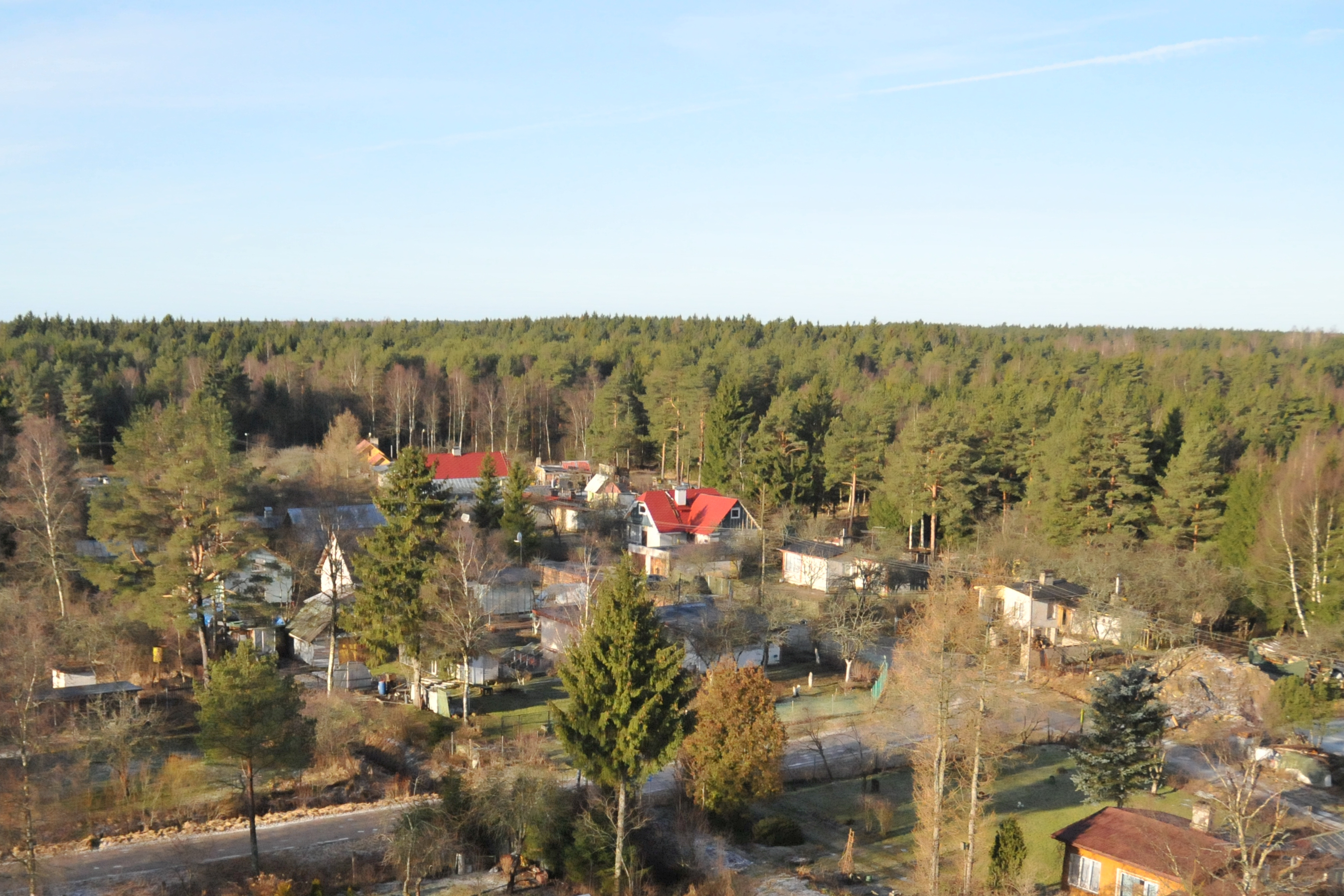
- Aerial photogtaph of Metsanurme in 2008.
- Interactive map of Metsanurme
- Country: Estonia
- County: Harju County
- Parish: Saku Parish
- Time zone: UTC+2 (EET)
  - Summer (DST): UTC+3 (EEST)

Metsanurme is a village in Saku Parish, Harju County in northern Estonia.
