= Kajamaa =

Village in Estonia

Coordinates: 59°17′N 24°42′E

- Village
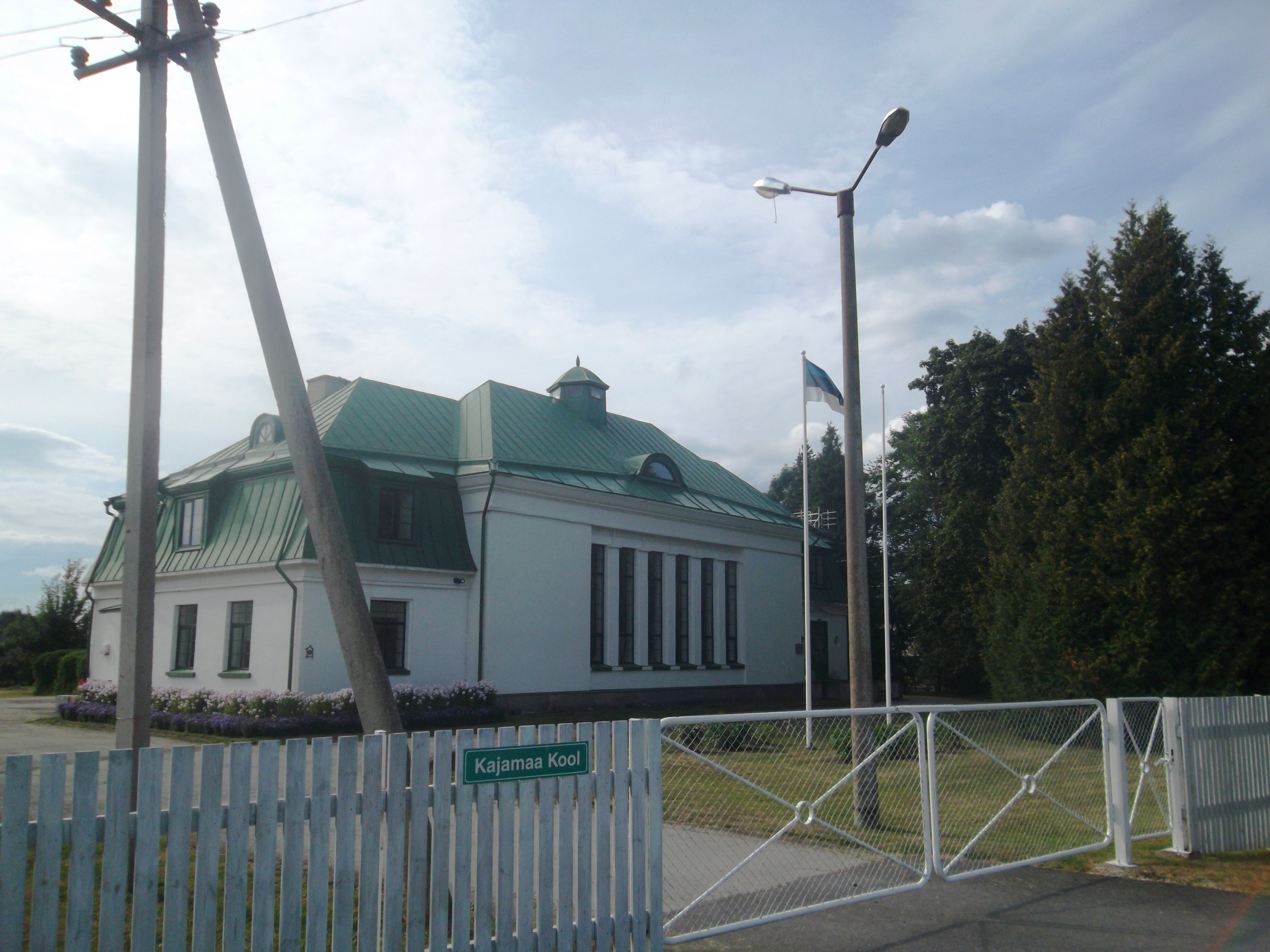
- Kajamaa school
- Interactive map of Kajamaa
- Country: Estonia
- County: Harju County
- Parish: Saku Parish
- Time zone: UTC+2 (EET)
  - Summer (DST): UTC+3 (EEST)

Kajamaa is a village in Saku Parish, Harju County in northern Estonia.
