= Männiku, Saku Parish =

Village in Estonia

Coordinates: 59°20′32″N 24°41′00″E

Männiku
- Village
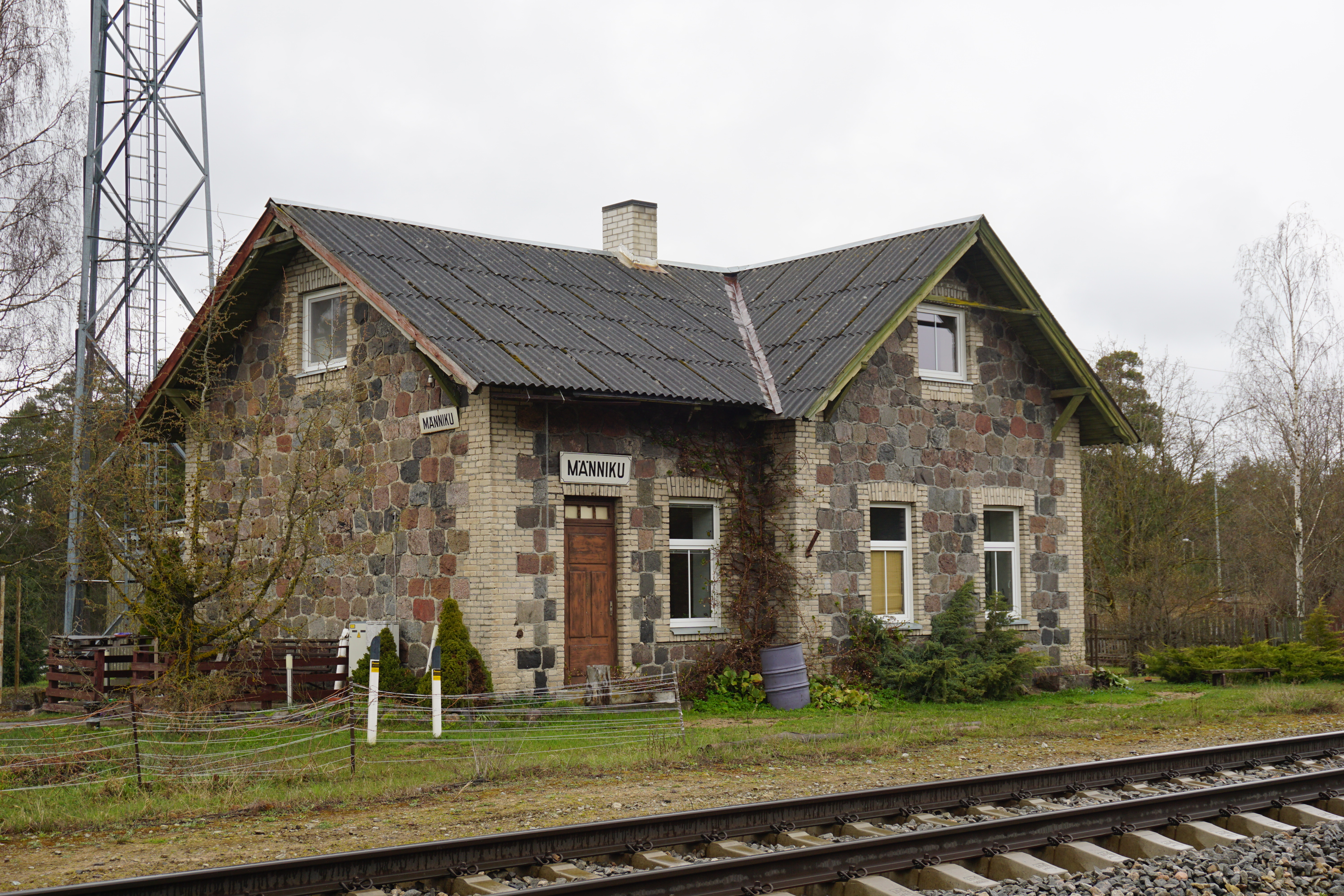
- Former train station in Männiku
- Interactive map of Männiku
- Country: Estonia
- County: Harju County
- Parish: Saku Parish
- Time zone: UTC+2 (EET)
  - Summer (DST): UTC+3 (EEST)

Männiku is a village in Saku Parish, Harju County in northern Estonia.

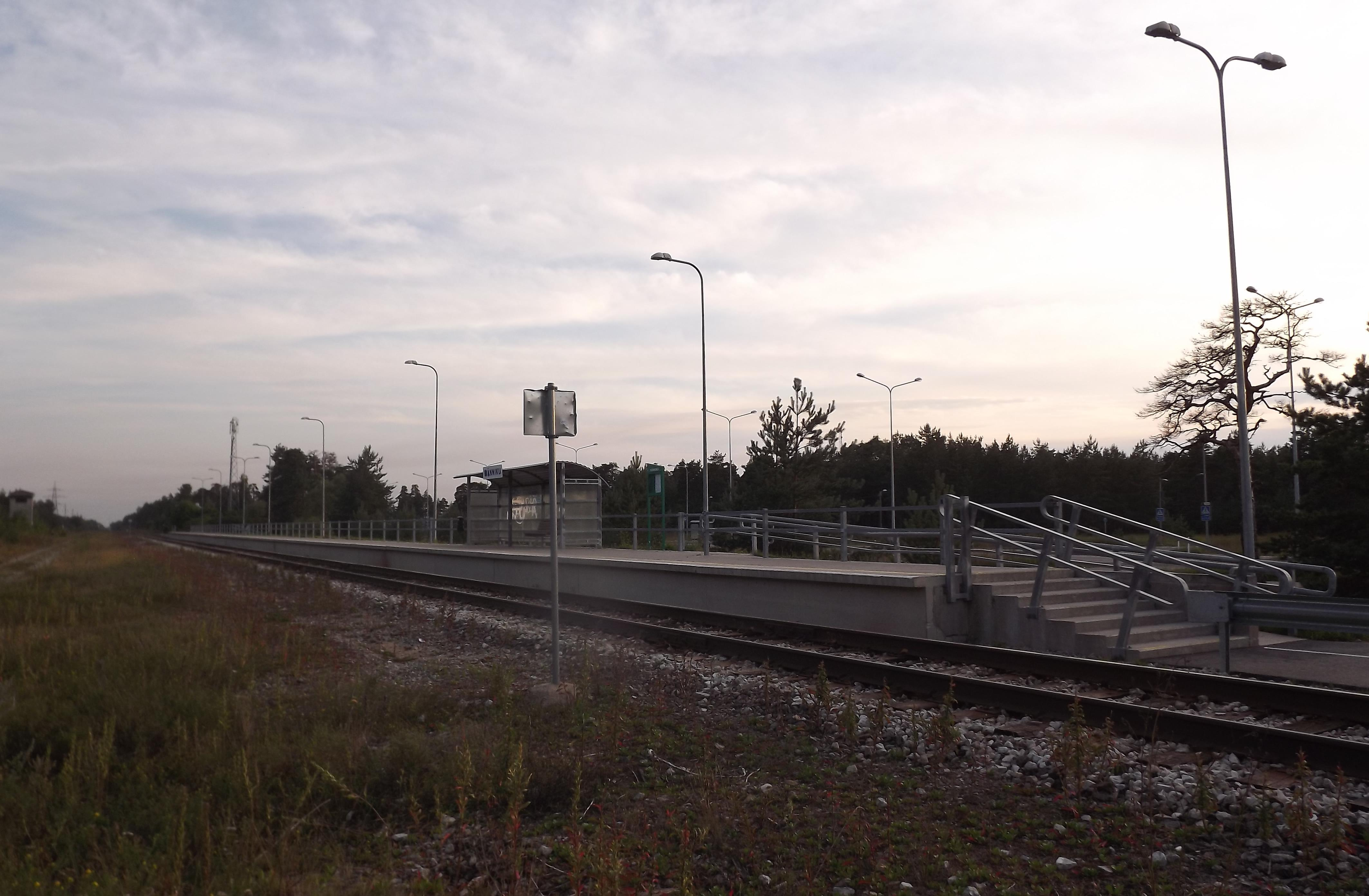
Männiku railway stop

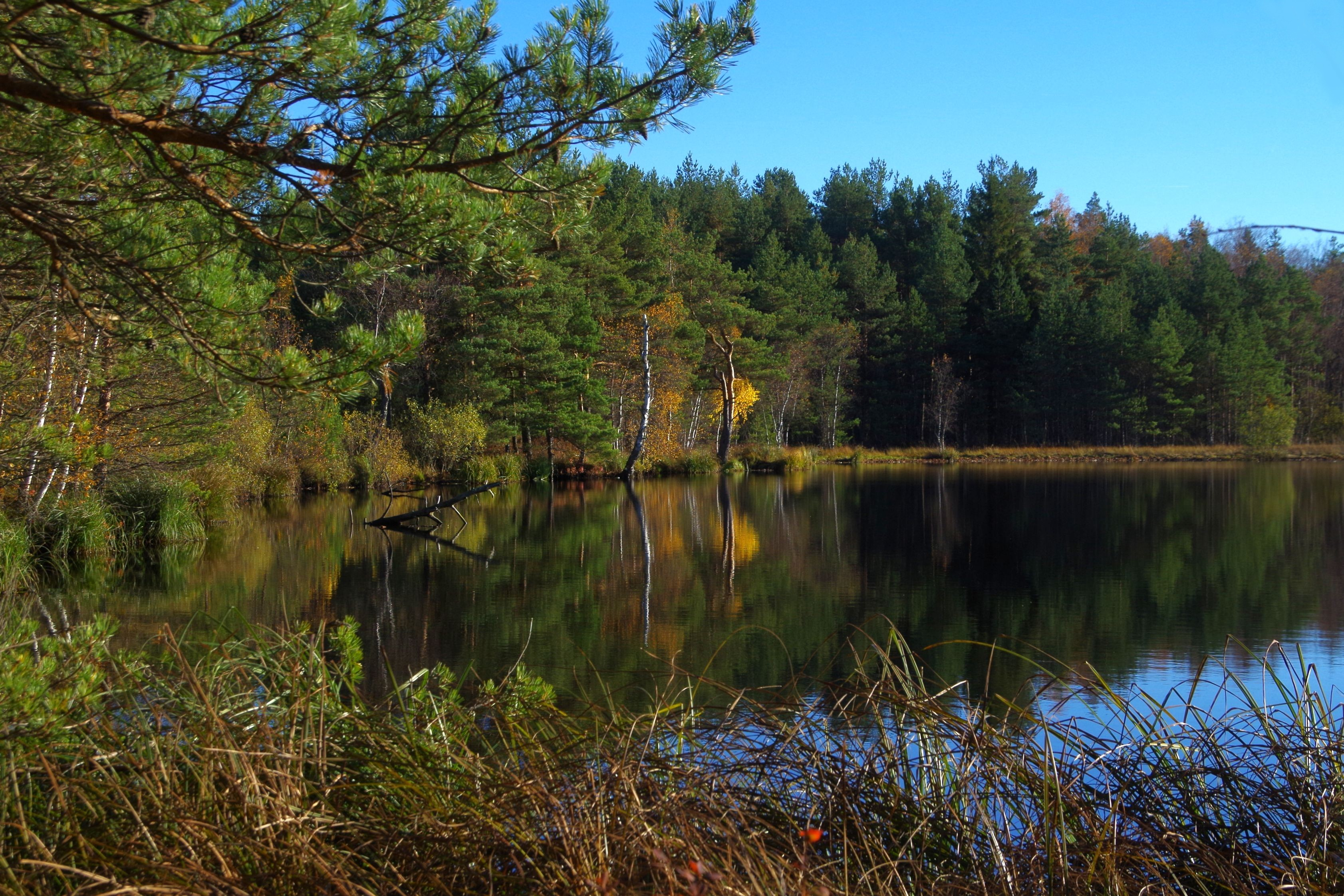
Lake Rätsepa in Männiku

It has a railway stop on the railway line from Tallinn to Viljandi operated by Elron (rail transit), formerly a railway station. The former station building is made of rubble stone and calcium silicate bricks, and it is now a private home.

About half of the village's territory (mostly its eastern part) is occupied by Männiku training area of the Estonian Defence Forces.

On 1 July 2019, the western part of the dissolved village of Tammejärve was merged with Männiku's territory.

== See also ==
- Männiku, Tallinn
- Männiku training area
