= Tõdva =

Village in Estonia

Coordinates: 59°16′N 24°42′E

- Village
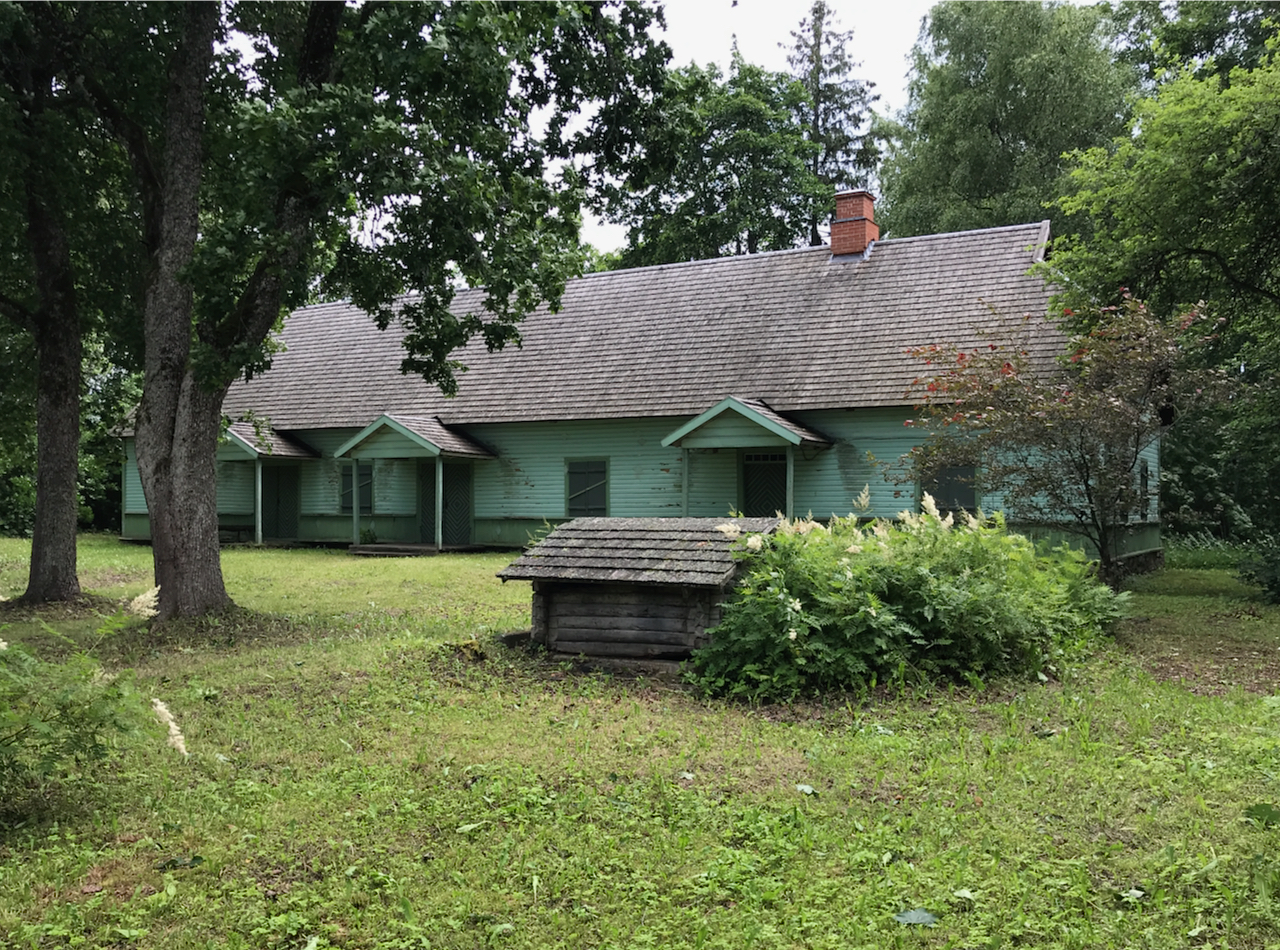
- Tõdva Bretheren Congregation Prayer House of the Estonian Evangelical Lutheran Church
- Interactive map of Tõdva
- Country: Estonia
- County: Harju County
- Parish: Saku Parish
- Time zone: UTC+2 (EET)
  - Summer (DST): UTC+3 (EEST)

Tõdva is a village in Saku Parish, Harju County in northern Estonia.
