= Kasemetsa =

Village in Estonia

Coordinates: 59°17′N 24°40′E

- Village
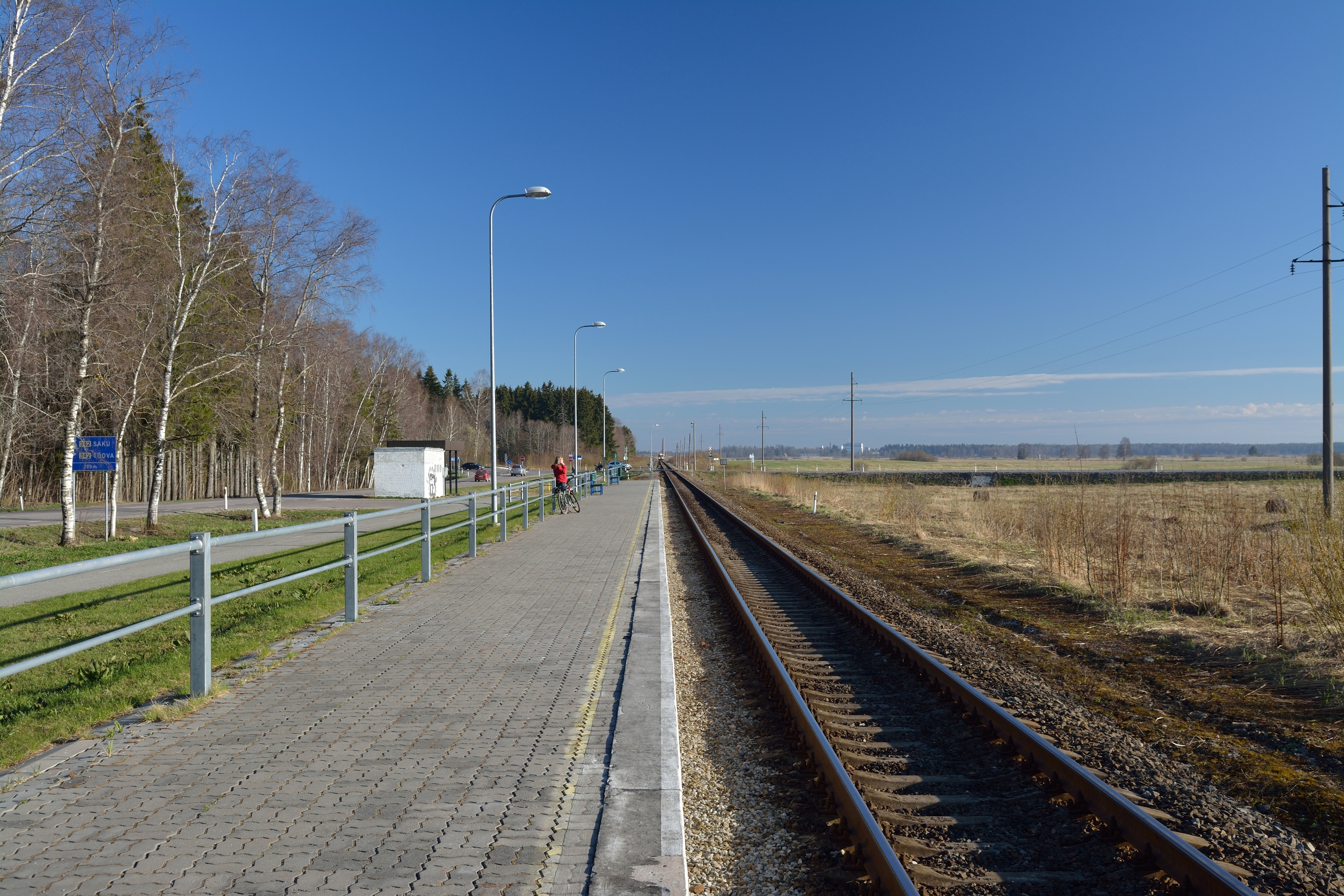
- Kasemetsa railway stop
- Interactive map of Kasemetsa
- Country: Estonia
- County: Harju County
- Parish: Saku Parish
- Time zone: UTC+2 (EET)
  - Summer (DST): UTC+3 (EEST)

Kasemetsa is a village in Saku Parish, Harju County in northern Estonia.

It has a railway station on the Tallinn - Viljandi railway line operated by Elron (rail transit).
