= Sookaera-Metsanurga =

Village in Estonia

Coordinates: 59°16′00″N 24°46′06″E

- Village
- Interactive map of Sookaera-Metsanurga
- Country: Estonia
- County: Harju County
- Parish: Saku Parish
- Time zone: UTC+2 (EET)
  - Summer (DST): UTC+3 (EEST)

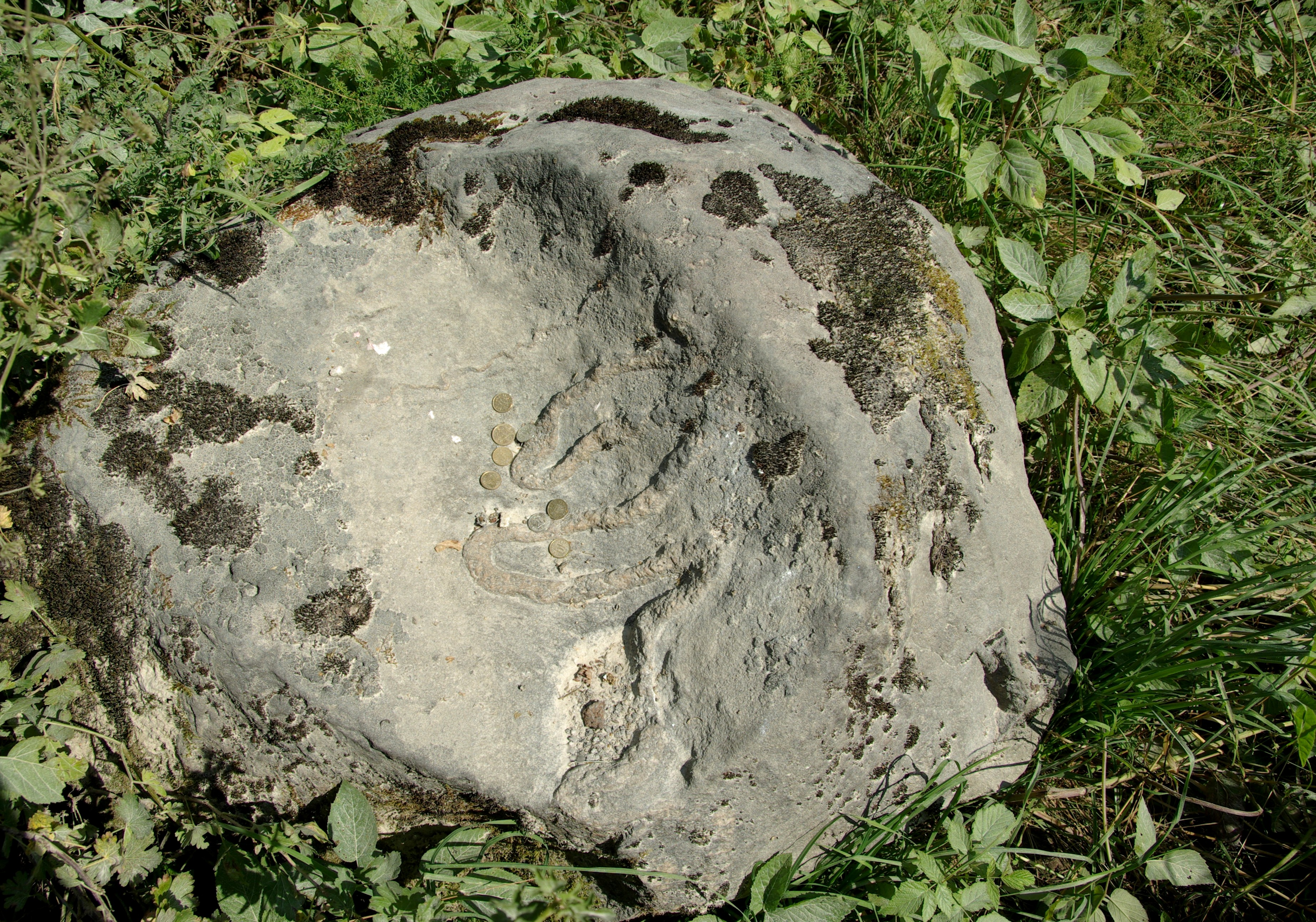
Ussikivi, an offering stone

Sookaera-Metsanurga is a village in Saku Parish, Harju County in northern Estonia.
