= Tammemäe =

Village in Estonia

Coordinates: 59°18′44″N 24°40′58″E

- Village
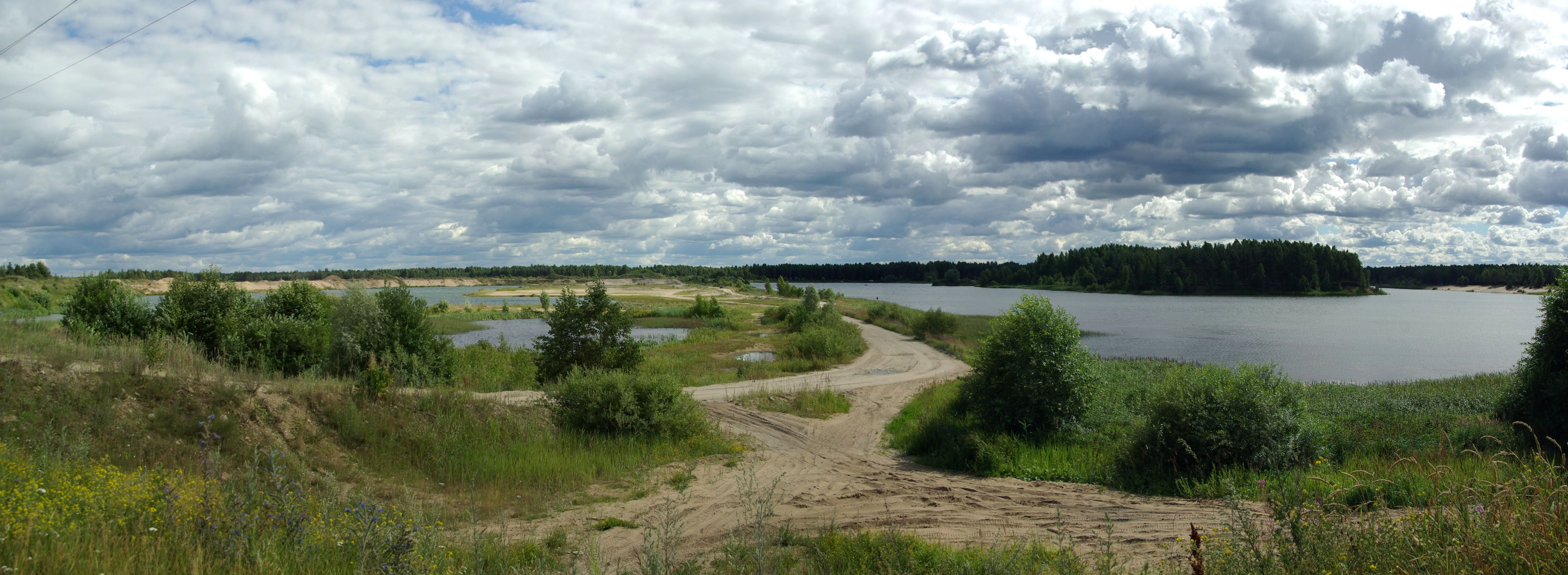
- Tammemäe lake and quarry
- Interactive map of Tammemäe
- Country: Estonia
- County: Harju County
- Parish: Saku Parish
- Time zone: UTC+2 (EET)
  - Summer (DST): UTC+3 (EEST)

Tammemäe is a village in Saku Parish, Harju County in northern Estonia.

A small portion of eastern part of Tammemäe's territory is occupied by Männiku training area of the Estonian Defence Forces.
