= Rail Baltica =

Railway network across the Baltic states

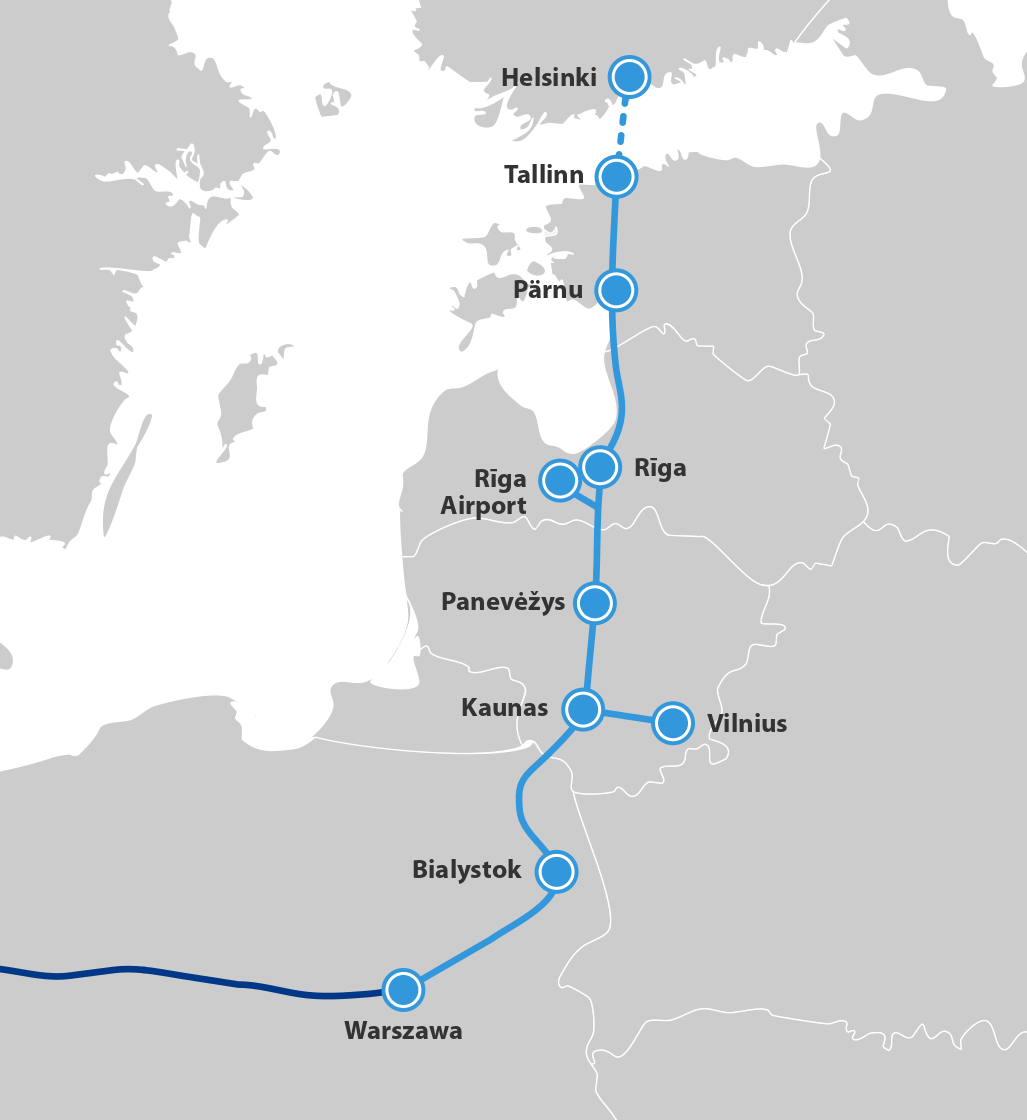

Overview
- Locale: Estonia, Latvia, Lithuania, Poland; Finland (proposed)
- Website: www.railbaltica.org

Service
- Type: Public high-speed railway
- System: Rail Baltica (European gauge railway)
- Services: Tallinn–Pärnu–Riga–Riga International Airport–Panevėžys–Kaunas/Vilnius–Białystok–Warsaw

History
- Planned opening: Phase 1 (single-track): 2030; Full (double-track): TBC

Technical
- Line length: 870 km (540 mi)
- Num of tracks: Single track (phase 1); Double track (project scope)
- Track gauge: 1,435 mm (4 ft 8 1/2 in) standard gauge (primary)
- Loading gauge: SE-C
- Electrification: 25 kV 50 Hz AC overhead line
- Operating speed: Passenger: 249 km/h (155 mph); Freight: 120 km/h (75 mph)
- Signalling: ERTMS L2

Rail Baltica is an under-construction rail infrastructure project that is intended to integrate the Baltic states in the European rail network. The project envisages a continuous rail link for passenger and freight services with stations from Tallinn (Estonia) to Warsaw (Poland), via Pärnu (Estonia), Riga (Latvia) and Kaunas (Lithuania), with two branches extending from the main line towards Riga International Airport and Vilnius (Lithuania). Its total length in the Baltic states is 870 kilometres (540 mi), with 213 kilometres (132 mi) in Estonia, 265 kilometres (165 mi) in Latvia, and 392 kilometres (244 mi) in Lithuania.

Rail Baltica will build the first large-scale mainline standard gauge railway in the region. Rail networks in Estonia, Latvia and Lithuania mainly use Broad gauge (1,520 mm). These countries' first railways were built in the second half of the 19th century as part of the Russian Empire rail network. While some railways were built or converted to narrow or standard gauge in the Interwar period between World War I and World War II in the independent or German-occupied Baltic states, these were later converted back to Russian gauge under Soviet occupation rule after 1945.

As of 2025, the completion of the phase 1 single-track railway from Tallinn through Latvia (Riga) to the Lithuania-Poland border is scheduled for 2030, with completion of the double track railway to follow dependent on funding. Rail Baltica is one of the priority projects of the European Union (EU). It is part of the North Sea–Baltic Corridor of the Trans-European Transport Networks (TEN-T) and it is also intended as a catalyst for building the economic corridor in Northeastern Europe. It has also been proposed to extend Rail Baltica to include an undersea railway tunnel between Tallinn and Helsinki. By 2024, the estimated cost of the project had increased from €5.8 billion in 2017 to €23.8 billion (at 2023 prices).

== Overview ==
The Rail Baltica project in 2006, when two routes were envisaged (the route finally chosen is an intermediate one, via Panevėžys in Lithuania and Pärnu in Estonia).

=== Genesis ===
The Rail Baltica project results from the three Pan-European Transport Conferences held in Prague (1991), Crete (1994) and Helsinki (1997). “Rail Baltica” corresponds to the rail element, from Tallinn to Warsaw, of the first of nine Pan-European transport corridors defined at the Crete conference in March 1994, while the road project is called “Via Baltica” (part of European route E67).

=== Proposed environmental impact ===
Rail Baltica will be an electric railway, motivated by a desire to reduce carbon emissions. The railway has been planned to avoid Natura 2000 protected areas, in addition to minimising impacts on other environmentally sensitive protected areas and existing 1,520 mm gauge railway networking areas. Wherever necessary, noise protection barriers will be installed. Special animal passages will be built through the embankment.

=== Stations ===
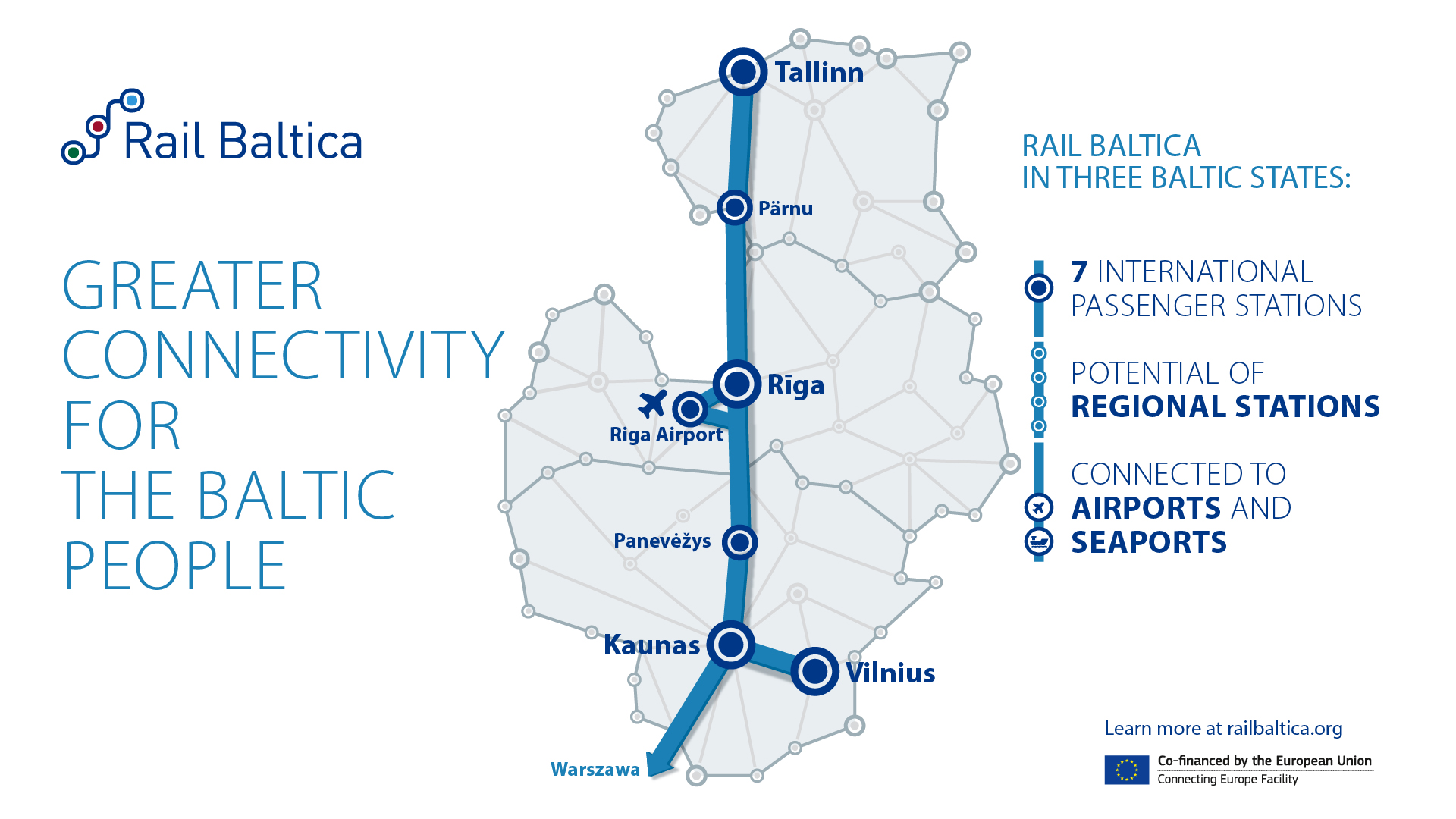
Map of the Baltic part of Rail Baltica (called "Rail Baltica Global Project") with stations

The railway project will enable intermodality and multimodality, i.e. transportation of freight through two or more methods of transportation. Rail Baltica includes plans for three multimodal freight terminals located in Muuga Harbour (Estonia), Salaspils (Latvia), and Kaunas (Lithuania). This is intended to create synergies with the existing 1,520 mm railway system infrastructure. There will be seven international passenger stations—in Tallinn, Pärnu, Riga, Riga Airport, Panevėžys, Kaunas, and Vilnius—with potential regional stations and connections to airports and seaports.

The section from Helsinki to Tallinn will be operated by existing commercial ferries. A proposed Helsinki to Tallinn Tunnel was considered to provide a rail link between the two cities. At the end of April 2021, governments of Estonia and Finland signed a memorandum of understanding committing themselves to cooperation in the area of transport. In February 2024, the tunnel was judged by Finnish Minister of Transport and Communications, Lulu Ranne to be unrealistic and that it was not on the agenda of the government.

=== Parameters ===
Rail Baltica will be built as a new, publicly owned, fast conventional railway. It will be electrified and equipped with the European Rail Traffic Management System (ERTMS) and FRMCS for signalling and communications. The maximum design speed is 249 km/h (155 mph) for passenger trains, while the maximum operational speed will be 234 km/h (145 mph). It is to operate as a single track railway as part of phase 1 of the project, with a double-track railway remaining in the project's scope. For freight trains, the maximum design speed is 120 km/h (75 mph). The new railway line will be built as 1,435 mm (4 ft 8 1/2 in) standard gauge. Other key technical parameters include:

- The maximum freight train length will be 1,050 m (3,440 ft).
- The maximum axle load will be 25 tonnes (25 long tons; 28 short tons).
- No level crossings with roads.
- No flat crossings with the 1,520 mm (4 ft 11 27/32 in) (Russian gauge) rail network.
- For maintenance and emergency services, access to the main line should be every 2–3 km (1.2–1.9 mi) and in specific areas.
- The railway will have ballasted track.
- Its electrification is to use 2 x 25 kV AC.
- Its double track side should be right-hand running when operational.
- It is ERTMS Level 2, Baseline 3.
- It is built to a SE-C loading gauge.

The network's parameters are in accordance with the EU Technical Specifications for Interoperability (TSI – P2, F1).

== Project organization ==
=== Project implementers ===
The Rail Baltica project is implemented by the three Baltic States: Estonia, Latvia, and Lithuania. Finland announced in February 2019 that it would also join the project.

The beneficiaries of the Rail Baltica project are ministries of the three Baltic States: Estonia's Ministry of Economic Affairs and Communications, Latvia's Ministry of Transport, and Lithuania's Ministry of Transport and Communications. In 2014, they established RB Rail AS, a joint venture that acts as the main coordinator and project implementer for the project. Its main business is the design, construction, and marketing of the railway. RB Rail AS also submits EU financing proposals for the Rail Baltica purchasing body for all parties for the procurement of studies, plans, designs for the Global Project, sub-systems (control, command, and signalling and energy/electrification), raw materials, key components, and cross-border track sections.

Rail Baltic Estonia OU in Estonia, Eiropas Dzelzceļa līnijas SIA in Latvia, and Rail Baltica statyba UAB and LtgInfra in Lithuania are the national implementing bodies. All construction carried out by the implementing bodies is done under the supervision of RB Rail AS and is based on common procurement principles, rules, and contract templates.

=== Financing ===
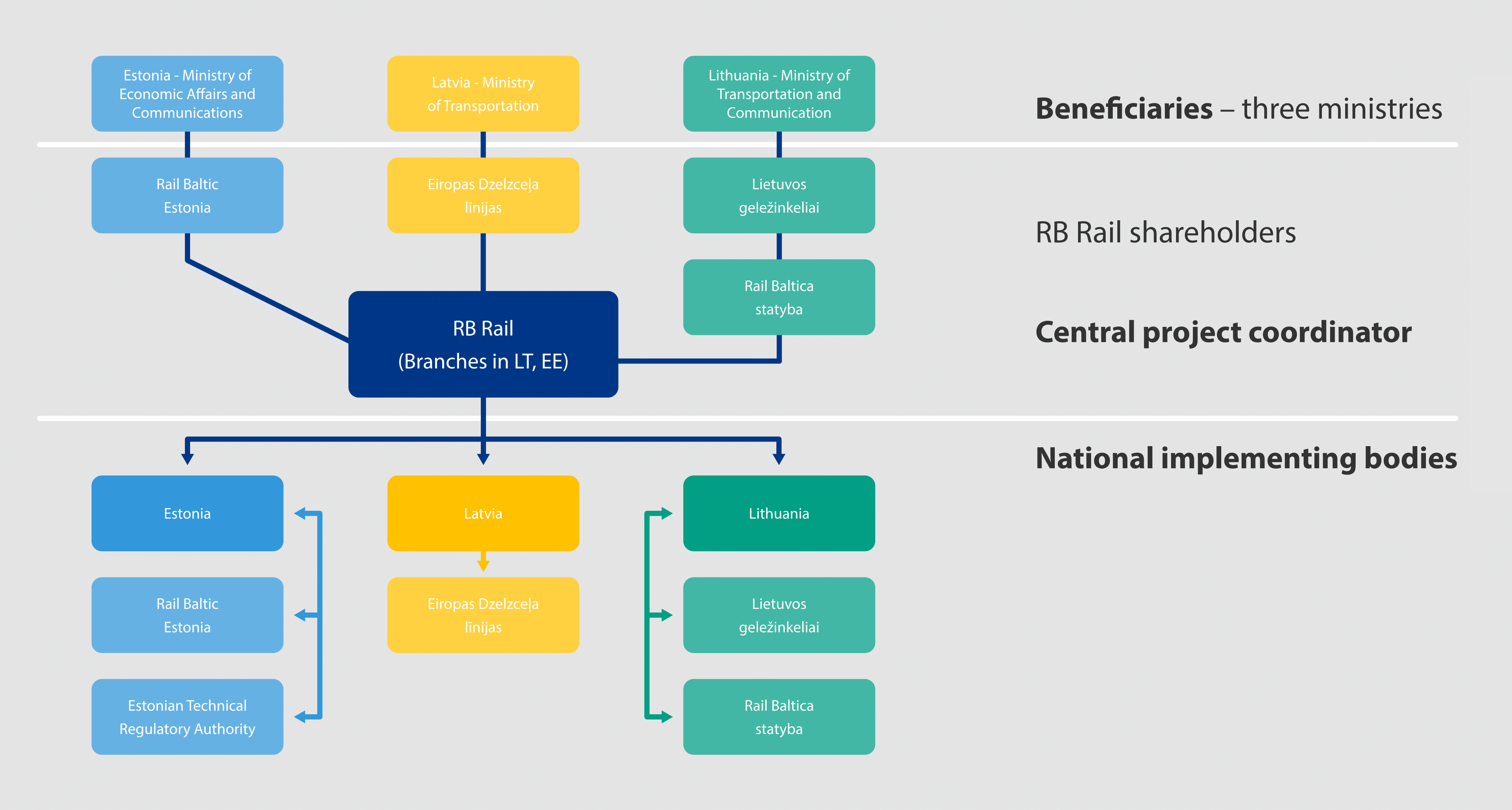
Rail Baltica project structure

A feasibility study of Rail Baltica in the three Baltic States carried out by AECOM in May 2011 estimated a cost of €3.6 billion for the railway and proved that Rail Baltica is economically viable. Based on that study, key political and practical decisions—both on the national and EU level—were made to implement Rail Baltica.

Since the AECOM study, the project has grown to include additional elements to the Rail Baltica Global Project for better connectivity, passenger mobility, and inter-modality. These additions include routing the Rail Baltica passenger mainline through the Riga International Airport and the construction of the airport passenger station (Latvia), the Kaunas–Vilnius connection (Lithuania), an improved connection in Kaunas (Lithuania), and the construction of the Ülemiste–Tallinn airport tram line (Estonia). Moreover, the preparation of environmental impact assessments, spatial planning, and some preliminary designs has provided better investment estimations for the project.

Thus, in April 2017, the overall cost of the Rail Baltica Global Project implementation in all three countries—including the construction of the Kaunas–Vilnius section—was estimated to be €5.8 billion, according to a cost-benefit study carried out by Ernst & Young and Atkins International experts, based on the European Union's CBA guidelines. The analysis showed that the project was financially feasible and viable, social benefits were proved, and its measurable benefits would outweigh the costs. This provided the necessary updated parameters for continued EU and national co-financing of the project.

The project's profitability lies in its wider socio-economic benefits, which Ernst & Young estimated to be around €16.22 billion. In addition, several immeasurable (mostly catalytic) benefits would be created through regional integration, such as tourism development, new business creation, increased attractiveness to FDI, access to new export markets, technological transfer, and innovation.

The project is financed by the member states, the European Union TEN-T budget, and the Structural and Cohesion Funds provided to the EU New Member States. By the start of 2018, the three Baltic States and RB Rail AS had received two grants totaling €765 million designed under the CEF for the construction of the Rail Baltica railway. On 13 July 2018, a third grant agreement was signed for an additional €130 million, of which €110 million was CEF contribution. In July 2020, another CEF funding was received, amounting to €216 million for construction, technical design, and planning works. In total, the project has received around €1.2 billion from the EU and national funds.

In October 2023, Rail Baltica joint venture of the Baltic States, RB Rail AS, announced the signing of an additional cross-border Grant Agreement for Connecting Europe Facility (CEF) funding, which amounted to 928 million euros CEF support. This substantial funding, combined with national co-financing from the three Baltic States, will exceed €1.1 billion, enabling necessary activities for further high-speed infrastructure development.

As of 2024, the estimated cost of the project increased to €23.8 billion euros, with the phase 1 single track railway estimated at €15.3 billion. A 2024 joint review by the audit institutions of the Baltic states found that the project faced a funding shortfall of €10.1 billion for the first phase and €18.9 billion overall, warning of a likely funding gap in 2027-2028, noting that rolling stock and operating costs were not included in the project budget. A report by the European Court of Auditors in 2026 suggested this estimate may not be accurate, as mature design studies only existed for about a third of the route and the full project no longer had a clear implementation timeline after phase 1.

== Project progress ==
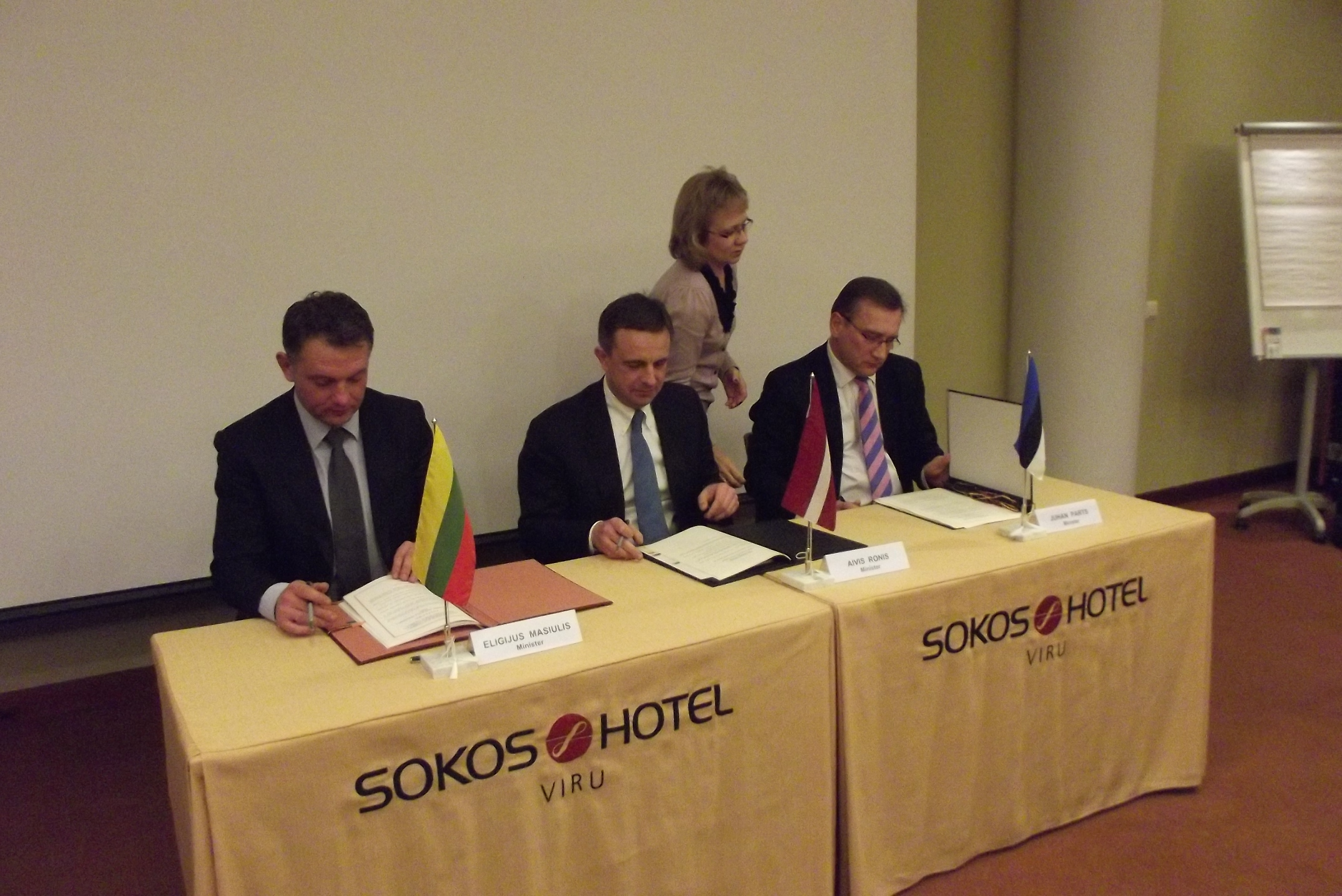
In December 2011, the Baltic transport ministers signed a declaration on Rail Baltica at the Sokos Hotel Viru

In 2017, all three Baltic parliaments ratified the Inter-Governmental Agreement for the Rail Baltica project, thereby confirming their long-term commitment to the project.

In August 2016, the spatial planning for the entire Rail Baltica railway line was approved in Latvia by the decision of the Latvian Government. This was followed by the approval of the Lithuanian Government in January 2017 for their respective section from Kaunas to the border with Latvia. The route for the section from Kaunas to the border with Poland, known as Rail Baltica I, is subject to the results of an Upgrade Feasibility Study. On 14 February 2018, the Ministry of Public Administration of the Republic of Estonia approved the spatial plan for the line in Estonia, leading to the setting of the final route and preliminary design of the railway in the country. With Estonia's decision, the spatial territorial planning and preliminary technical design of the Rail Baltica railway in the Baltic states was finalised.

The Rail Baltica project entered the design phase in all three Baltic States with the approval of detailed design guidelines. Certain sections have finished consolidating preliminary technical design, tendering the detailed technical design services, and preparing a BIM strategy. On 20 March 2018, the first Rail Baltica construction design and supervision contract—for Rail Baltica's Riga International Airport railway station, related infrastructure, and viaduct—was signed by Eiropas Dzelzceļa līnijas SIA and PROSIV, the winner of the open international tender and a partnership of suppliers from three countries: Prodex (Slovakia), Sintagma (Italy), and Vektors T (Latvia).

In 2018, studies related to commercialisation and supply materials were finalised, including a long-term business plan, an operational plan, an infrastructure management study, and an upgraded feasibility study of the European gauge railway line from Kaunas to the Lithuanian–Polish border. In 2019, the first cornerstone of Rail Baltica was laid in Estonia to mark the beginning of construction of the Saustinõmme viaduct. Also, detailed technical design contracts were signed for the following sections: Tallinn–Rapla and Pärnu–Rapla in Estonia, Kaunas–Ramygala and Ramygala–Latvian/Lithuanian border in Lithuania, and Vangaži–Salaspils–Misa and the main line through Riga in Latvia. With the contracts signed, geotechnical research was started in different sections of the railway in order to gather information about the soil.

At the start of construction in 2019, Rail Baltica was expected to begin operations on some sections by 2028, with the overall corridor scheduled for completion by 2030.

The overall length of the railway between Tallinn and Warsaw will be at least 950 km (590 mi), while the length within the Baltic States proper will be 870 km (540 mi).

In 2020, the development of detailed technical design had progressed to cover 643 km (400 mi) of the main track, which included all railway sections in Estonia and Latvia as well as sections from Kaunas to the Latvian/Lithuanian border in Lithuania.

In Estonia, discussions about environmental impact assessment were started and meetings were planned until the end of 2020. During the discussions, people were invited to ask questions regarding the project's environmental impact, while various technical solutions were presented.

In Latvia, the Riga Central Station construction was officially started with ceremonies on 23 November 2020. On the 3rd of February 2021, the project implementer of Riga Airport Station was also chosen; construction began in May 2021 and is ongoing as of August 2026. Talks with NGOs in Riga were started to discuss technical solutions within the city, especially for infrastructure elements such as crossings and overpasses.

The Russian invasion of Ukraine has raised the importance of this European project, because of the connectivity across Europe that it will create, for civilian and military travel. Lithuania has a new commission to speed construction within the cities (freight terminal facilities and passenger depot). Estonia faces cost increases and construction delays.

On 9 July 2025, the European Commission adopted Implementing Decision (EU) 2025/1332, repealing the earlier 2018 implementing decision after the project’s timetable had been overtaken by the COVID-19 pandemic, Russia’s invasion of Ukraine and Rail Baltica’s technical and financial challenges. The completion of the single-track railway from Tallinn to the Lithuania-Poland border as part of phase 1 is scheduled for 2030, with the rest of the network's schedule dependent on funding. There has been doubt cast on this revised timeline, with Poland's deputy infrastructure minister Piotr Malepszak suggesting the 2030 target was "impossible", suggesting 2040 to be more realistic.

=== Rail Baltica I (completed in 2015) ===
The name "Rail Baltica" is also sometimes used to mean the first phase of European gauge railway construction from the Poland/Lithuania border to Kaunas in Lithuania. It was inaugurated on 16 October 2015. The project, which built one track at European standard-gauge alongside the existing Russian gauge tracks, cost €380 million. The 119 km line accommodates diesel trains, with passenger trains running at up to 120 km/h and freight trains at up to 80 km/h. Higher speeds will depend on future electrification, a new signal system, and more level crossing gates. In June 2016, Lithuanian Railways and Polregio started weekend passenger train service between Kaunas and Białystok.

In Estonia and Latvia, implementation of the Rail Baltica I project included upgrades of the existing rail lines in the region. The 66-kilometre-long (41 mi) Russian gauge line from Tartu to Valga (on the Latvian border) in Estonia was renovated between 2008 and 2010. The work was done by the Finnish VR Group for a cost of €40 million.

=== Planning phase: route and standard ===
Rail Baltica in Poland

The planning phase of Rail Baltica took place from 2010 to 2017. In 2011, the three Baltic States agreed on a route connecting Tallinn, Pärnu, Riga, Panevėžys, and Kaunas. A feasibility study for this option estimated the line would cost about €3.68 billion in total.

During the planning of the location of the project route in the Baltic States, a conceptual agreement among the three countries was reached that the railway should be as straight as possible, as this provides the highest benefits at the lowest cost. The shorter and more direct the route is, the faster traffic it can ensure, which economically has the highest advantage compared to its alternatives. This was confirmed by an AECOM study in 2013.

Initially, two options were considered. Both options included upgrading the existing standard gauge railway to enable travel speeds of up to 160 km/h (99 mph) along the stretch in Poland from Warsaw via Białystok and Ełk to Trakiszki, followed by a new railway with standard gauge from Trakiszki to Kaunas. For the remainder of the route to Tallinn, two different options were considered:

1. The first option was to upgrade the existing state-owned Tallinn–Tartu–Riga–Joniškis railway to 160 km/h (maintaining its Russian gauge) and build a new state-owned railway from Joniškis–Kaunas with 160 km/h, also at Russian gauge. However, because of the break of gauge at Kaunas, passengers would have to change trains there. For freight, a reloading facility or a bogie exchange station would be placed near Kaunas. This option was already completed as Rail Baltica I.
2. The second option was a new standard gauge railway with 200 km/h (120 mph) speed and 3 kV DC power (the same voltage as in Poland) from Kaunas via Joniškis to Riga, as above, but then continuing in a shorter, straighter line via Pärnu to Tallinn. This option was chosen as the preferred route. The existing Lelle–Pärnu line in Estonia was permanently closed for passenger operations on 9 December 2018, as it required a €17 million refurbishment.

The Šiauliai–Latvian border rail section (using broad gauge) was newly built and scheduled to be finished in 2015 with an estimated cost of €270 million. In Latvia, the existing railway upgrade between Riga and Valka was finished in 2016 at a cost of €97 million. The EU contributed about 25% of the cost for the three parts.

=== Construction (2017–present) ===
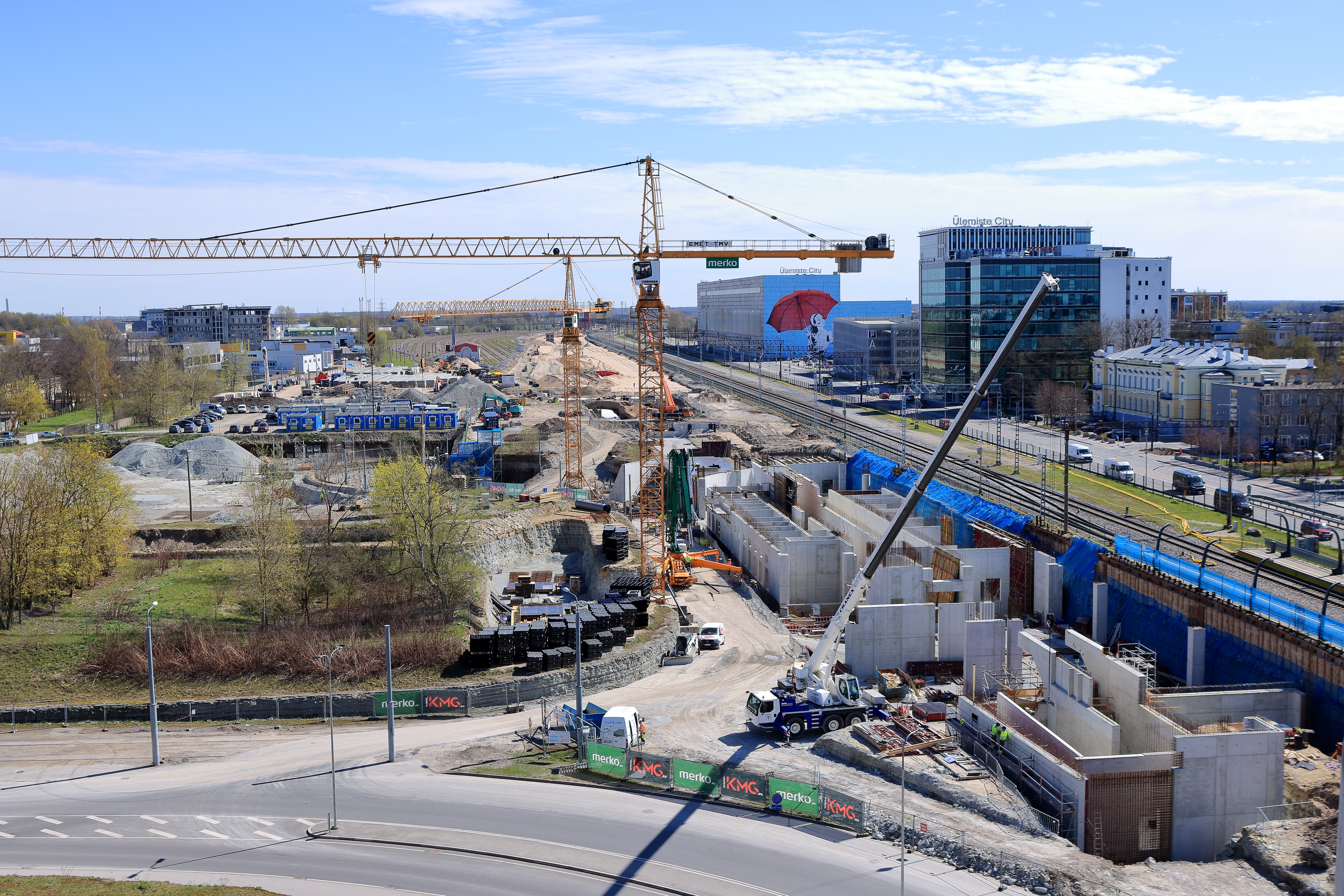
Construction of Rail Baltica Ülemiste terminal in Tallinn - May 2024

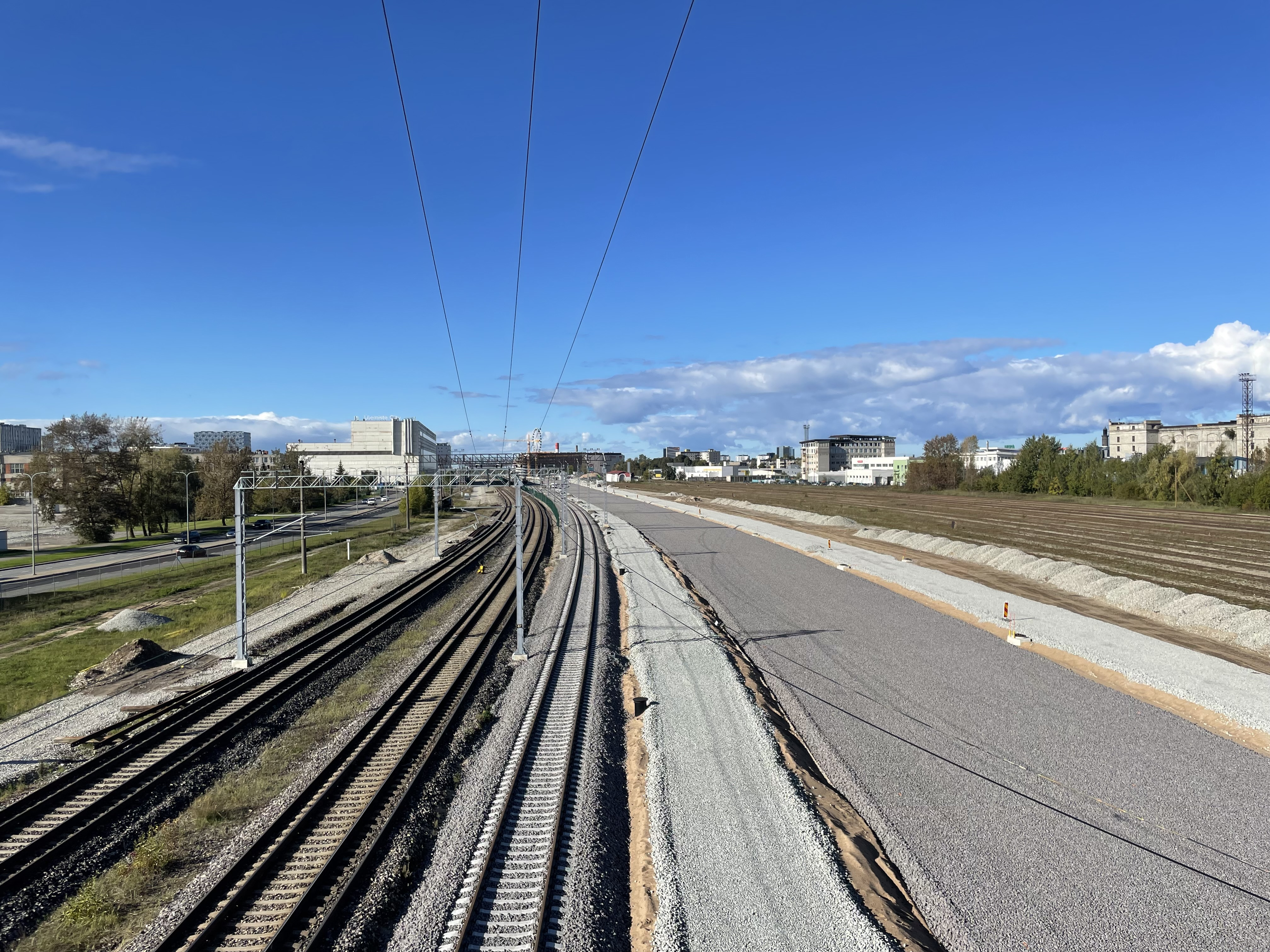
Construction of Rail Baltica tracks at Ülemiste station in Tallinn

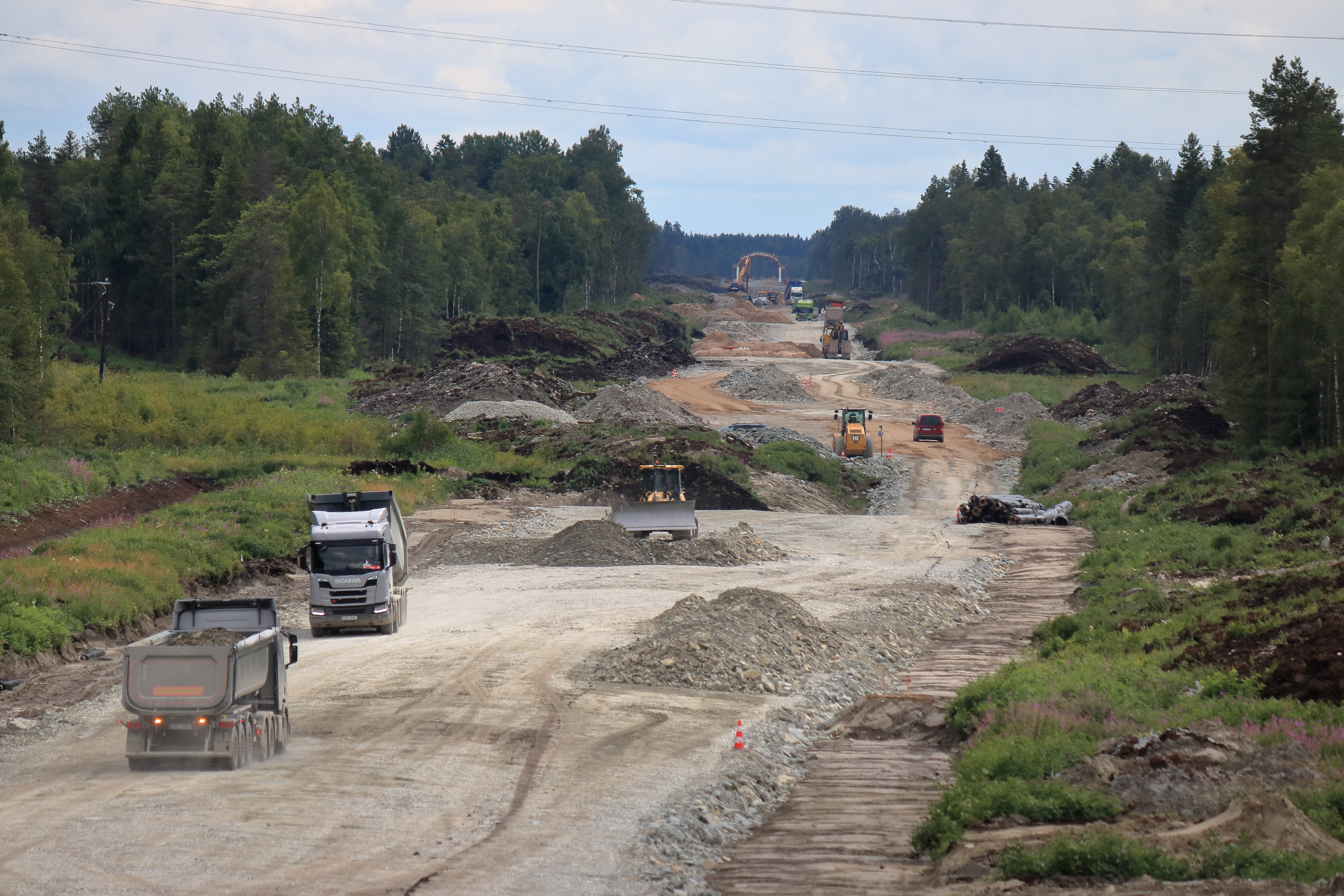
Construction of Rail Baltica in Rapla county, Estonia - July 2026

==== Baltic states (new line) ====
In 2017, the parliaments of the three Baltic States ratified the intergovernmental agreement on Rail Baltica, stating that the "route shall be from Tallinn through Pärnu–Riga–Panevėžys–Kaunas to the Lithuanian/Polish state border with a connection of Vilnius–Kaunas as a part of the railway" and defining a design speed of 240 km/h for passenger travel. Thus, the Rail Baltica Global Project route was aligned from Tallinn until Kaunas, with the pre-existing European gauge railway line section from Kaunas to the Lithuanian/Polish border being subject to the results of the Upgrade Feasibility Study. Nevertheless, in April 2018, the Ministries of the three Baltic States approved the design guidelines of Rail Baltica, which state that the maximum design speed will be 249 km/h and maximum operational speed should be 234 km/h.

For the Kaunas (Jiesia)–Lithuanian/Polish border section, a 78.1 km route named "alternative 6A" was approved in May 2022 by the Lithuanian Ministry of Transport and Communications, taking into account the opinion of the majority of the local residents. This optimal route is the shortest among the alternatives which were proposed and the most remote from the urban areas.

On 29 February 2024, construction on the Rail Baltica Riga Central Railway Station reached the rooftop, which was celebrated with a ceremony according to Latvian tradition. This train station is expected to become the busiest in the Baltics once Rail Baltica is fully operational.

According to data presented in June 2026, construction had begun on key sections of Rail Baltica (900 km in total): 107 km in Estonia, 200 km in Latvia, and 114 km in Lithuania; this included 43% of the 267-kilometre-long main line (Phase I). In July 2026 it was reported that 9 km of the rail link between Poland and Lithuania had been completed, and the other new sections were in progress, while existing tracks were being upgraded for faster and safer train travel. At the same time, some other sections faced setbacks due to lack of funding or redesigning plans; for example, the 27-km section from Misa (in Vecumnieki Parish, Latvia) to the Lithuanian border had by late May 2026 already been cleared of trees, elevated, and access roads and construction materials depots built, but due to delays in funding, lagging planning and establishing a contract aimed at reducing overall cost from 686 to 465 million euros, construction of the embankment and rails had not yet begun.

==== Poland (line upgrade plus new section) ====
Max speed in Poland on the Rail Baltica corridor (2022/2023)

The line from Warsaw to the Lithuanian border, almost 400 km long, is currently being modernized, which will increase maximal speed to 200 km/h, and even 250 km/h on some sections, compared with operating speeds of around 120 km/h previously. This will reduce journey times from over 5 h to around 3 h. The project is divided into 5 sections, Warsaw-Sadowne, Sadowne-Czyżew, Czyżew-Białystok, Białystok-Ełk, and finally, Ełk-Lithuanian border, this last section having the particularity of including a new line construction and having to be newly electrified using the 25 kV AC system. As of 2025, the last of these sub-projects is scheduled for completion shortly after 2030.

== Rolling stock ==
In March 2026, the national railway operators of Estonia, Latvia and Lithuania launched a joint procurement for up to 20, 106 m, standard-gauge EMUs capable of 200 km/h for Rail Baltica regional services, with orders led by Elron (5, with options for 2), Vivi (up to 5) and LTG Link (up to 8), for entry into passenger service by 2030.

== Benefits ==
The Baltic railway infrastructure will be connected to the European railway corridor, ensuring high-speed passenger travel and freight movement. Rail Baltica creates the possibility to shift the major freight transport in the regions from road to rail, which is currently being transported towards Russia and then north by heavy trucks. In the case of Poland, trucks follow local roads and directly cross the villages of Podlaskie Voivodeship.

According to the 2017 cost-benefit study by Ernst & Young, the benefits from Rail Baltica are calculated to be:

- €7.1 billion saved in climate change and noise reduction
- 30–40% relevant truck traffic flow shifted to railways
- 13,000 jobs created during the construction phase
- €5.3 billion saved for passenger and freight travel
- 5.3 million passenger hours saved
- 400 human lives saved in 29 years

According to a study produced by Ernst & Young, the measurable socio-economic benefits are estimated at €16.2 billion. The assessed GDP multiplier effect the Rail Baltica Global Project would create is an additional €2 billion.

In late April 2022, implementers of the Rail Baltica project presented the progress at the European Parliament where the strategic and geopolitical security importance of the project was stressed repeatedly in reference to the 2022 Russian invasion of Ukraine.

== Criticism ==
Criticism started after the feasibility study published by AECOM in 2011, with the government of Lithuania keen to include a link to Vilnius. The mayor of Tartu, Estonia's second-largest city, called for the city to be included in the route.

In 2013, the Estonian Association for the Club of Rome advised the government to abandon the Rail Baltica route. Problems in the environmental assessment programme have also been claimed.

In 2017, two Estonian environmental groups claimed that the lack of public participation on the decision made by Baltic governments and building of a new line, rather than upgrading the existing network, is in conflict with the Aarhus Convention.

In 2016, 2017, 2018 and 2020 five open letters were composed in Estonia which called on the Estonian government and parliament to stop the project in its planned form. The main arguments in these letters were that the new track as a greenfield project will cause too much damage to nature and does not essentially improve travel possibilities.

On 8 June 2017, Priit Humal, Karli Lambot, Illimar Paul, and Raul Vibo, experts on logistics and engineering, published a critical analysis of the Rail Baltica cost-benefit analysis made by Ernst & Young, claiming that €4.1 billion of the stated socio-economic benefits are faulty and therefore the Rail Baltica project was neither feasible nor eligible for EU financing. They asked for comments from RB Rail AS, the Rail Baltica coordinator, who provided answers four months later. The authors of the first study claimed that the issues raised in their previous analysis were not adequately addressed in the official replies and that therefore Rail Baltica will be detrimental to society.

The authors of the critical analysis have been accused of having a conflict of interest, as one of the authors owns a logistics company. It has been claimed that Rail Baltica would decrease the volume of business for road transport businesses. The author has denied these claims.

== See also ==
- Via Baltica (E67)
- Helsinki–Tallinn Tunnel
- Rail transport in Estonia
- Rail transport in Latvia
- Rail transport in Lithuania
- Rail transport in Poland
- Rail transport in the European Union
- Pan-European Corridor I
- Suwałki Gap
