= Rahula, Estonia =

Village in Estonia

Coordinates: 59°17′38″N 24°33′51″E

Rahula
- Village
- Interactive map of Rahula
- Country: Estonia
- County: Harju County
- Parish: Saku Parish
- Time zone: UTC+2 (EET)
  - Summer (DST): UTC+3 (EEST)

Rahula is a village in Saku Parish, Harju County in northern Estonia.
