= Riga Airport railway station =

Rail Baltica railway station under-construction in Latvia

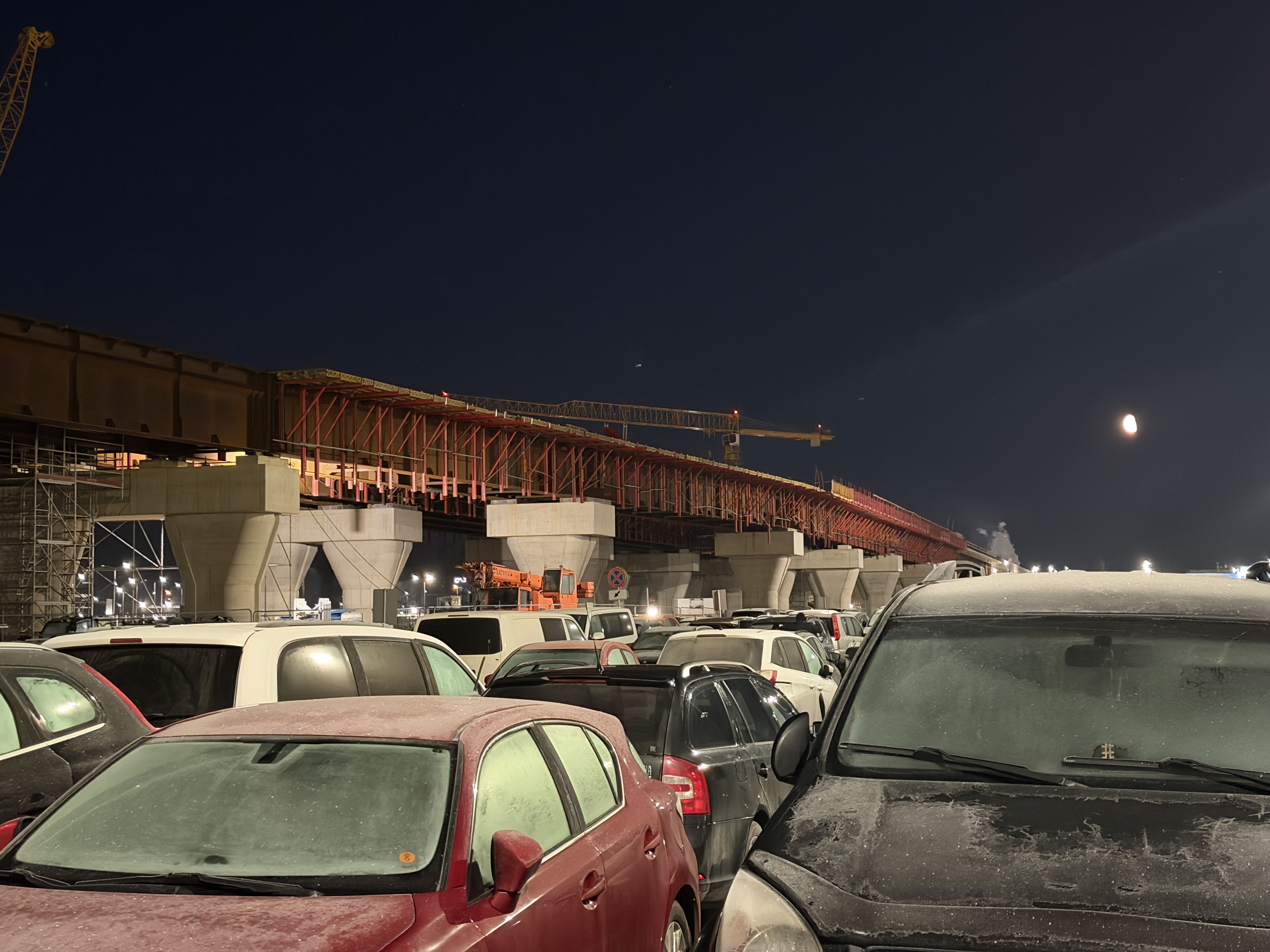
- Station viaduct under construction in March 2026

General information
- Location: Riga Airport, Mārupe municipality Latvia
- Coordinates: 56°55′18.893″N 23°58′59.892″E
- Line: Riga–Riga Airport Railway
Location

Riga Airport railway station is a train station that is under construction in Latvia, Mārupe Municipality, on the new under-construction rail infrastructure project Rail Baltica line Riga–Riga Airport. It is located next to Riga International Airport. The Riga Airport railway station is part of the international Rail Baltica project, which aims to integrate the Baltic states into the European rail network.

== History ==
Construction of the station near the airport began on 30 June 2021. The project is being implemented by the Latvian company "Eiropas Dzelzceļa līnijas", while the "B.S.L. Infra" partnership is carrying out construction work, comprising "Swietelsky AG", "SIA Binders", and "LNK Industries".

The project involves the construction of a new Rail Baltica railway station, an approximately 6 km long viaduct, and the railway infrastructure and tracks that will connect the airport to Riga's city center and the future Rail Baltica main line. The station will serve as the first high-speed rail and aviation connection hub in the Baltics, facilitating convenient transfers between trains and flights. Construction work is being organized in stages to avoid disrupting the airport's daily operations.
