= Tagadi, Estonia =

Village in Estonia

Coordinates: 59°13′N 24°46′E

Tagadi
- Village
- Interactive map of Tagadi
- Country: Estonia
- County: Harju County
- Parish: Saku Parish
- Time zone: UTC+2 (EET)
  - Summer (DST): UTC+3 (EEST)

Tagadi is a village in Saku Parish, Harju County in northern Estonia.
