= Tännassilma =

Tännassilma may refer to several places in Estonia:

- Tännassilma, Järva County, village in Türi Parish, Järva County
- Tännassilma, Põlva County, village in Põlva Parish, Põlva County
- Tännassilma, Tartu County, village in Elva Parish, Tartu County

== See also ==
- Tänassilma (disambiguation)
