= Roobuka =

Village in Estonia

Coordinates: 59°14′N 24°39′E

- Village
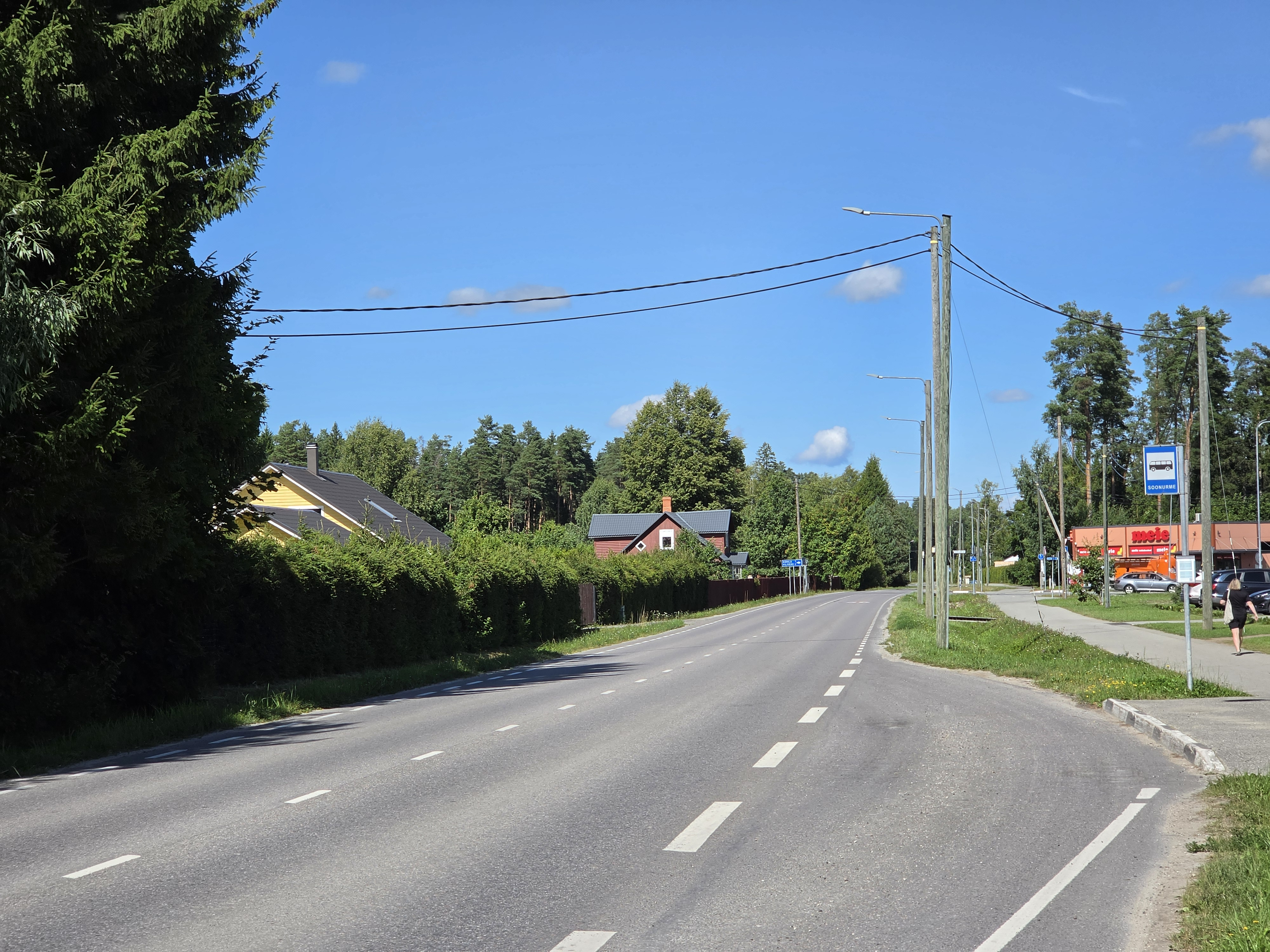
- Tõdva–Hageri Road in Roobuka village, near Soonurme bus stop
- Interactive map of Roobuka
- Country: Estonia
- County: Harju County
- Parish: Saku Parish
- Time zone: UTC+2 (EET)
  - Summer (DST): UTC+3 (EEST)

Roobuka is a village in Saku Parish, Harju County in northern Estonia.

It has a railway station on the Tallinn - Viljandi railway line operated by Elron (rail transit).
