= Üksnurme =

Village in Estonia

Coordinates: 59°18′N 24°37′E

- Village
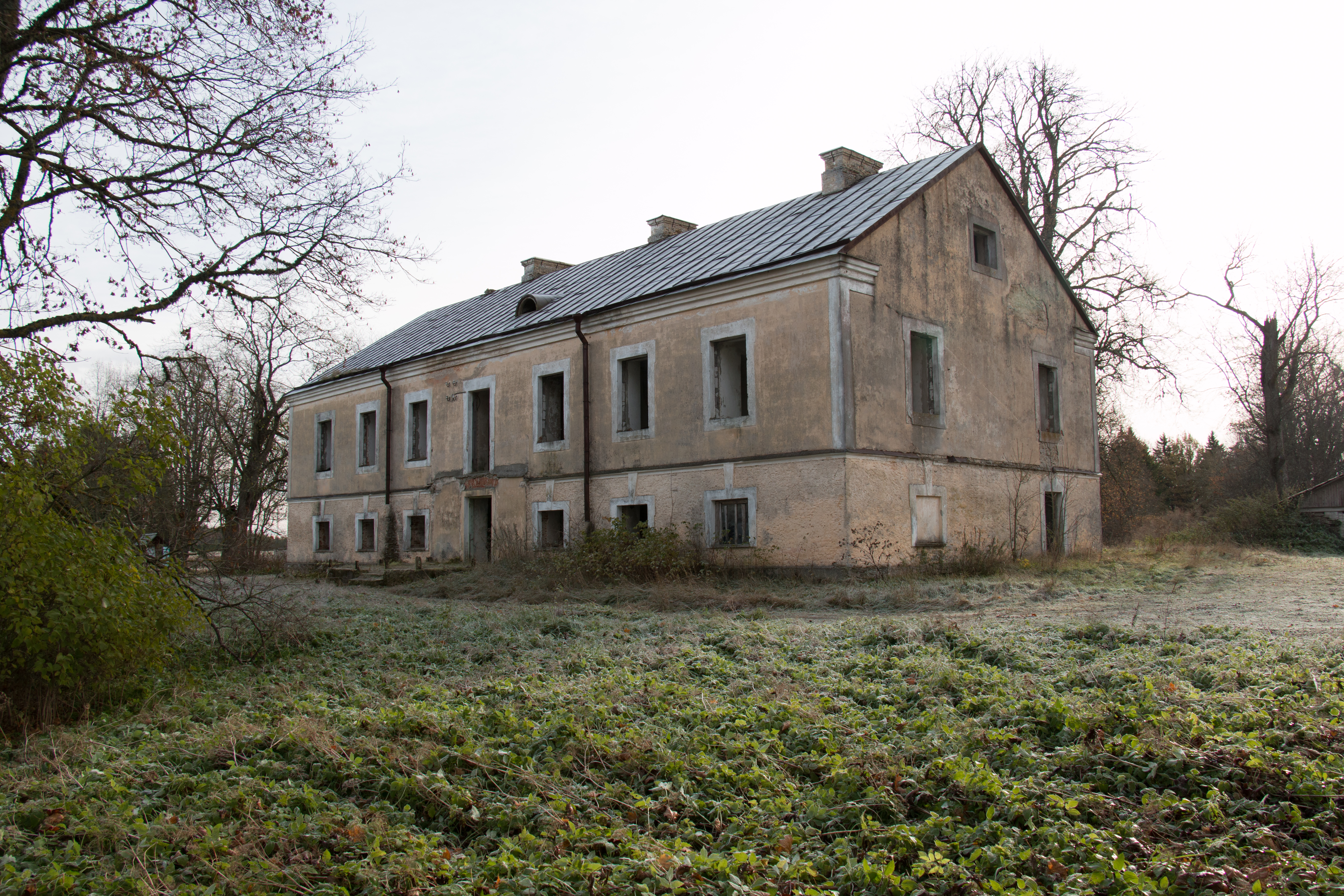
- The old Üksnurme main manor building
- Interactive map of Üksnurme
- Country: Estonia
- County: Harju County
- Parish: Saku Parish
- Time zone: UTC+2 (EET)
  - Summer (DST): UTC+3 (EEST)

Üksnurme is a village in Saku Parish, Harju County in northern Estonia.

Estonian strongman and entrant to the World's Strongest Man contest Andrus Murumets lives in Üksnurme.
