= Lokuti =

Village in Estonia

- Village
- Location in Estonia
- Coordinates: 59°16′46″N 24°44′43″E
- Country: Estonia
- County: Harju County
- Municipality: Saku Parish
- First mentioned: 1499

Population (01.06.2012)
  - Total: 95

Lokuti is a village in Saku Parish, Harju County, Estonia, located about 17 km (11 mi) south of the capital Tallinn. It has a population of 95 (as of 1 June 2012).

The Tallinn–Rapla (Tallinn–Viljandi) road (nr. 15) passes through Lokuti. The Vääna River flows through the village on its northern side.

In 1499 a Lokuta farmstead (Locketal) was mentioned on the site for the first time. Later a support manor of Saku Manor was located here (Paulshof). The nowadays settlement developed in the 1950s. In the 1960s a barn for cows with 448 slots was built.

In 2006 there were plans to build 1600 new residential buildings into Lokuti, so the settlement would grow into a small borough with a population of 5000. Since then no building process has taken place.
