= Saustinõmme =

Village in Estonia

Coordinates: 59°18′30″N 24°44′42″E

- Village
- Interactive map of Saustinõmme
- Country: Estonia
- County: Harju County
- Parish: Saku Parish
- Time zone: UTC+2 (EET)
  - Summer (DST): UTC+3 (EEST)

Saustinõmme is a village in Saku Parish, Harju County in northern Estonia.
