= Tänassilma, Harju County =

Village in Estonia

Coordinates: 59°20′07″N 24°39′08″E

Tänassilma
- Village
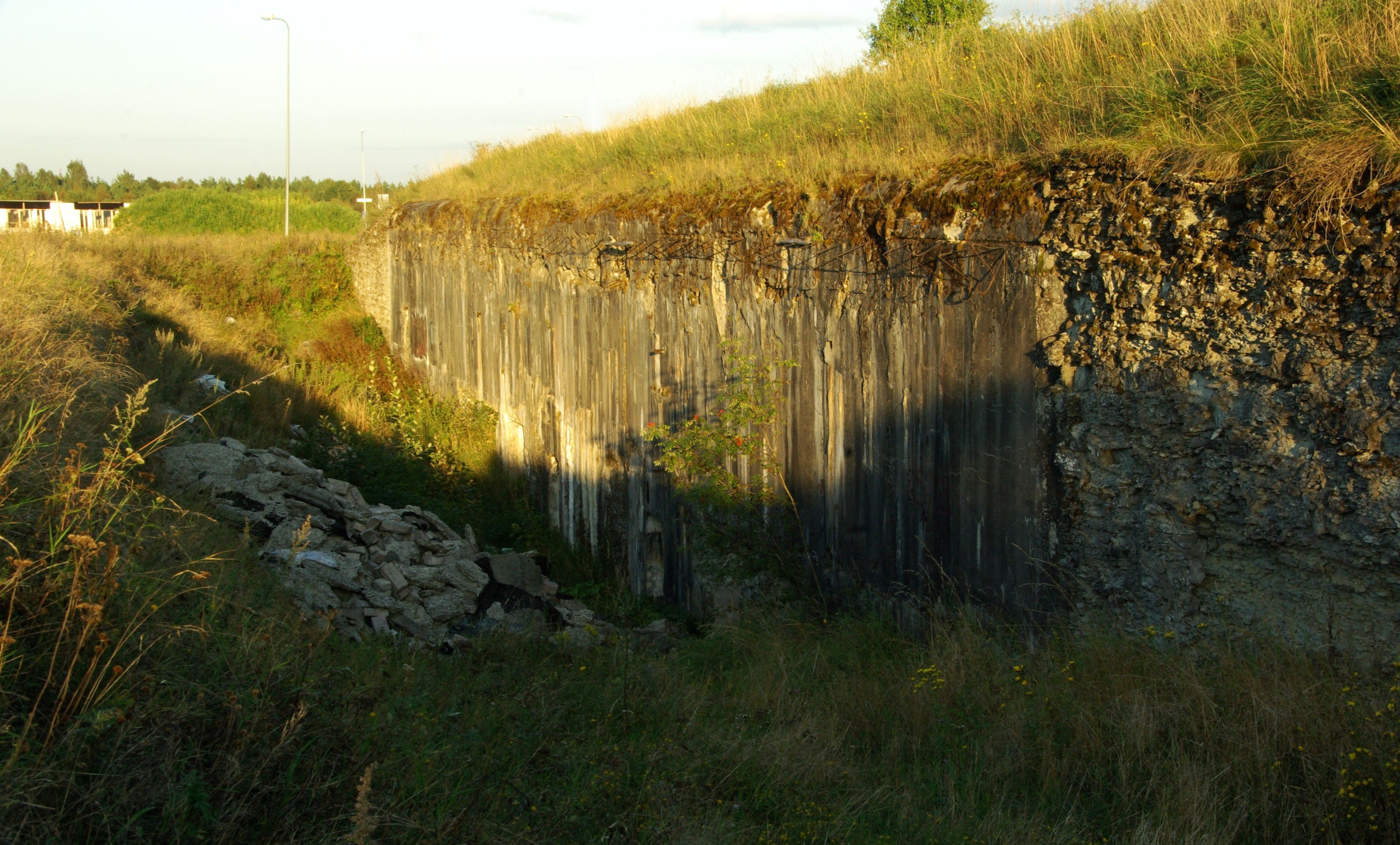
- Interactive map of Tänassilma
- Country: Estonia
- County: Harju
- Parish: Saku
- Time zone: UTC+2 (EET)
  - Summer (DST): UTC+3 (EEST)

Tänassilma is a village in Saku Parish, Harju County in northern Estonia.

Tänassilma Technological Village (Tänassilma tehnopark) is located on the Pärnu road near the Tallinn city boundary.
