= Saku Parish =

Municipality of Estonia

Coordinates: 59.3°N 24.666667°E

Saku Parish Saku vald
- Municipality of Estonia
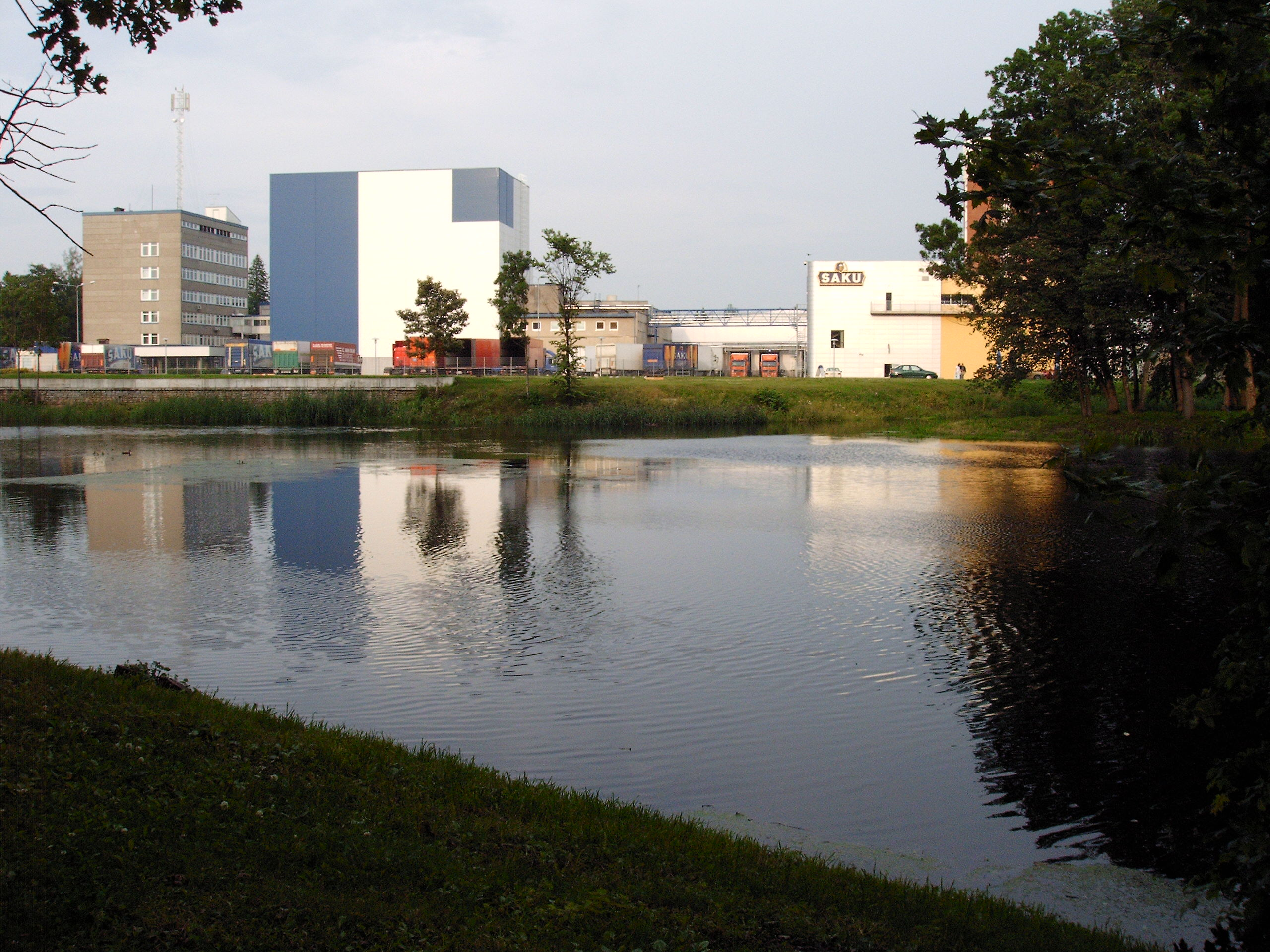
- Saku brewery

- Flag Coat of arms

- Saku Parish within Harju County.
- Country: Estonia
- County: Harju County
- Administrative centre: Saku

Government
  - Mayor: Marti Rehemaa

Area
  - Total: 171.13 km^{2} (66.07 sq mi)

Population (2006)
  - Total: 8,031
  - Density: 46.93/km^{2} (121.5/sq mi)
- ISO 3166 code: EE-719
- Website: www.sakuvald.ee

Saku Parish (Estonian: Saku vald) is a rural municipality in Harju County, north-western Estonia.

The administrative centre of Saku Parish is Saku; a small town with population of 4,618 (as of 2005). It is situated 10 km south of Estonia's capital, Tallinn.

== History ==
Established in 1866.

Awarded the Japanese Foreign Minister’s Commendation for their contributions to promotion of mutual understanding between Estonia and Japan on December 1, 2020.

== Local government ==
Current chairman of the council (est: volikogu esimees) is Eero Alamaa.

As of 2018, the mayor (est: vallavanem) is Marti Rehemaa.

== Religion ==
According to the census, 10.5 per cent of the population in the municipality aged at least fifteen identified themselves as Lutherans, 2.9 per cent as Orthodox, 3.1 per cent as others Christians. 2.8 per cent of respondents said they followed other religions or their affiliation was unknown. The majority of residents, 80.7 per cent were religiously unaffiliated.

== Geography ==
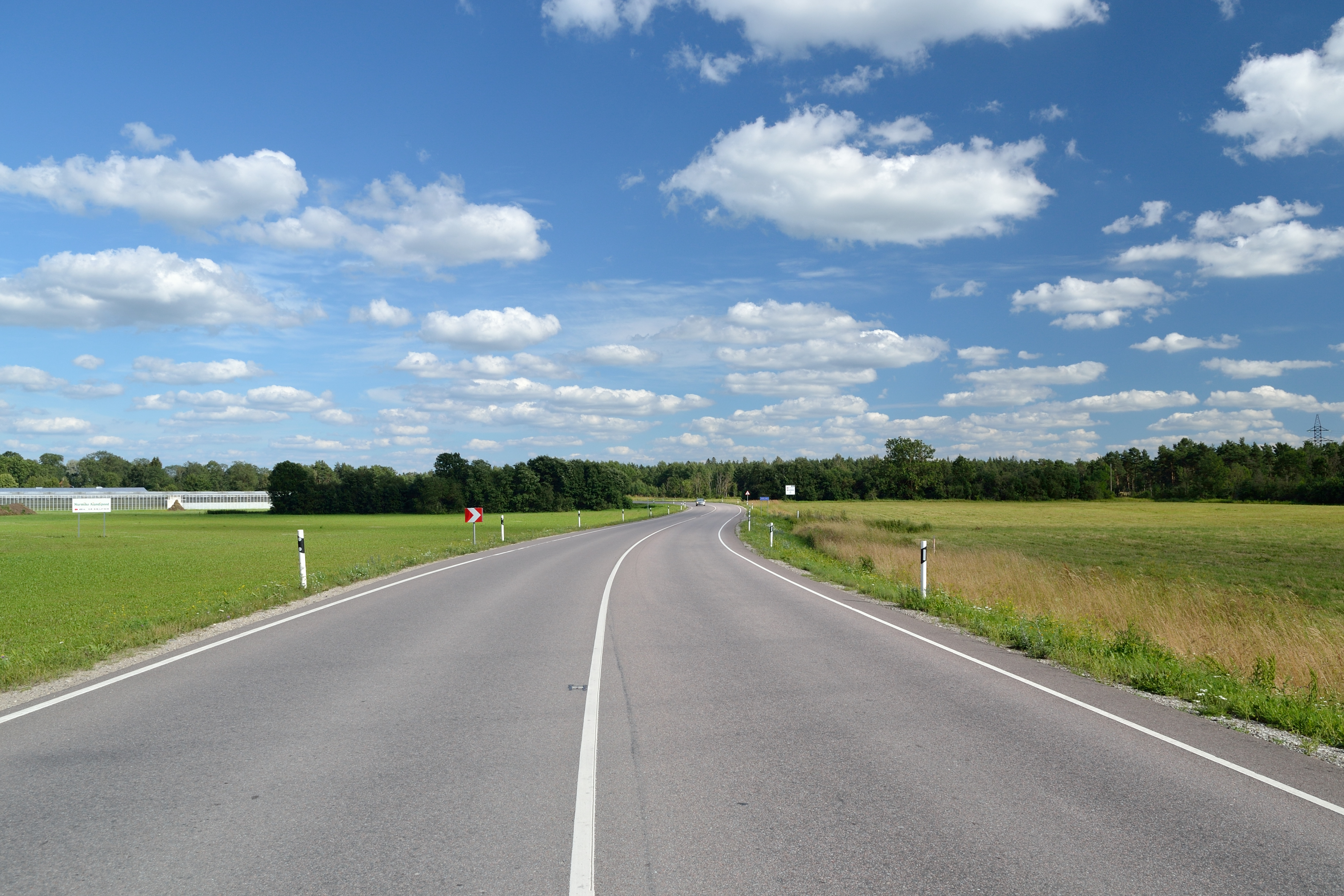
Tallinn–Saku–Laagri road in Saku Parish.

=== Populated places ===
There are 2 small towns (est: alevikud, sg. alevik) and 19 villages (est: külad, sg. küla) in Saku Parish.

Small towns: Kiisa, Saku.

Villages: Jälgimäe, Juuliku, Kajamaa, Kasemetsa, Kirdalu, Kurtna, Lokuti, Männiku, Metsanurme, Rahula, Roobuka, Saue, Saustinõmme, Sookaera-Metsanurga, Tänassilma, Tagadi, Tammemäe, Tõdva, Üksnurme.

== Sport ==
Kurtna is home to Bandy Federation of Estonia:

== Notable people ==
- Peter von Glehn (1835 in Jelgimeggi Manor – 1876), a Baltic German botanist.
- Nikolai von Glehn (1841 in Jälgimäe Manor – 1923), a Baltic German landowner and public figure, founded Nõmme
- Hugo Bernhard Rahamägi (1886 in Kurtna – 1941), prelate, politician and Bishop of Tallinn, 1934 to 1939
- Raivo Adlas (born 1940 in Kiisa), actor and theatre director.
- Jaak Urmet (born 1979 in Saku), writer, poet and novelist.
