= Glehn =

Glehn may refer to:

== Geography ==
- Glehn (Mechernich), a district of Mechernich, Euskirchen, North Rhine-Westphalia, Germany
- Glehn (Korschenbroich), North Rhine-Westphalia, Germany
- Glehn Castle, castle of Nikolai von Glehn in Vana-Mustamäe, Nõmme, Tallinn, Estonia

== Other ==
- De Glehn, a compound steam locomotive system named after Alfred de Glehn
- Glehn's spruce, (Picea glehnii), a species of conifer named after Peter von Glehn
- Glehnia, a monotypic genus in the carrot family Apiaceae named after Peter von Glehn

== People with the surname ==
- Alfred de Glehn (1848–1936), French railroad engineer; brother of Louise Creighton, uncle of Oswald von Glehn and Wilfrid de Glehn
- Jane Emmet de Glehn (1873–1961), American figure and portrait painter; wife of Wilfrid de Glehn
- Louise von Glehn (1850–1936), maiden name of British historian Louise Creighton
- Nikolai von Glehn (1841–1923), Baltic German estate owner, founder of the town of Nõmme
- Peter von Glehn (1835–1876), Russian botanist
- Wilfrid de Glehn (1870–1951), British impressionist painter

== See also ==
- Geleen
- Cleen
