= Bangpung (disambiguation) =

Bangpung, Peucedanum japonicum, is a namul vegetable also called "coastal hogfennel".

Bangpung may also refer to:

- Saposhnikovia divaricata, a.k.a. Siler, a medicinal herb
- Glehnia littoralis, a namul vegetable also called "beach silvertop"
