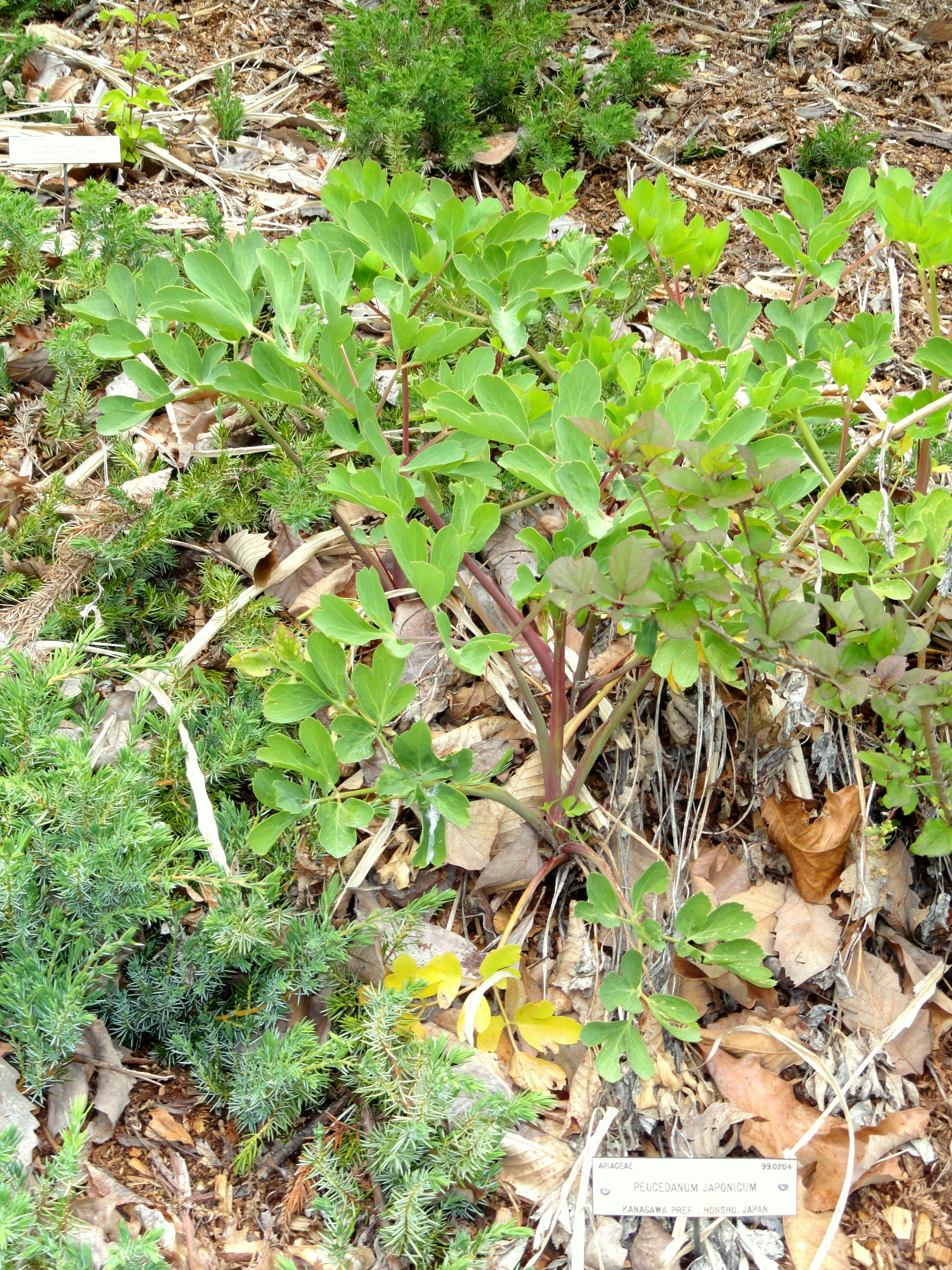

Scientific classification
- Kingdom: Plantae
- Clade: Tracheophytes
- Clade: Angiosperms
- Clade: Eudicots
- Clade: Asterids
- Order: Apiales
- Family: Apiaceae
- Genus: Peucedanum
- Species: P. japonicum

Binomial name
- Peucedanum japonicum Thunb.

= Peucedanum japonicum =

Species of flowering plant

Peucedanum japonicum, also known as coastal hog fennel, is a species of Peucedanum, a genus rich in medicinal species belonging to the parsley family, Apiaceae.

== Publication of binomial ==
Peucedanum japonicum was described by Carl Peter Thunberg in 1784.

== Description ==
Peucedanum japonicum has a stout umbellifer of 30–100 cm and is essentially glabrous. The stem is frequently flexuous. The leaf blade is broadly ovate-triangular. Its size is 35 x 25 cm. It is thinly coriaceous, bearing 1-2 ternate leaflets, which are ovate-orbicular, 3-parted, 7–9 cm broad and glaucous. Its central segments are obovate-cuneate, its lateral segments are oblique-ovate. Umbels are 4–10 cm across; bracts are either 2-3 or absent, ovate-lanceolate, 5-10 x circa 2mm, pubescent. It sports 15-30 rays of 1–5 cm, unequal and puberulous. It has 8-10 bracteoles, linear-lanceolate, equalling or longer than flowers. It has circa 20-flowered umbellules. The calyx teeth are obsolete. Petals are purple or white abaxially hispidulous. Its styles are short. The fruit is oblong-ovate or ellipsoid, to 6 x 4mm. It is hirsute, especially on dorsal ribs; its lateral ribs have very thick wings. Its vittae are small, with 3-5 in each furrow, 6-10 on commissure.

They flower in June to July and fruit from August to September.

== Habitat ==
The plant inhabits coastal areas and seashores below 100 meters, typically in soil found to be slightly acidic to mildly alkaline.

== Distribution ==
P. japonicum can be found in the Chinese provinces of Fujian, Hong Kong, Jiangsu, Shandong, Taiwan and Zhejiang in addition to Japan, Korea and the Philippines.

== Uses ==
=== Korea ===
In Korea, the plant is usually referred to as bangpung (방풍) or bangpungnamul (방풍나물) although its official name is gaetgireumnamul (갯기름나물). In Korean cuisine, the leaves of coastal hog fennel are used fresh as ssam vegetable (for hoe) or pickled in soy sauce and vinegar to make jangajji. It can be used as a main ingredient in namul dishes, or added as a herb to soybean paste stew, starch jelly dishes, fritters and pancakes, noodle soups and dough soups, stir-fried glass noodles, rice, or even Korean-style Italian lasagne.

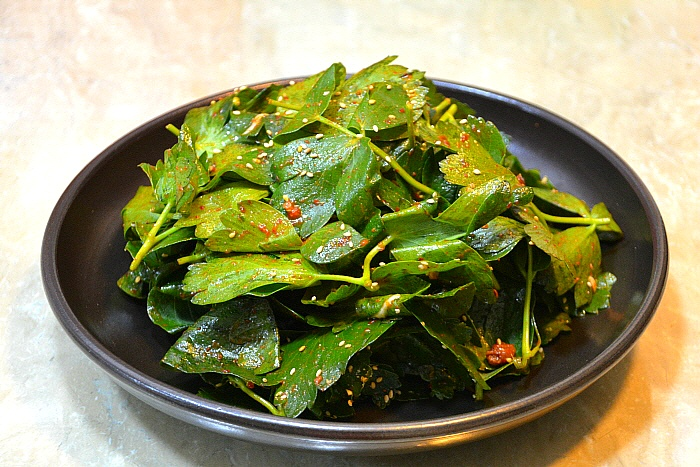
Bangpungnamul-muchim (seasoned coastal hogfennel leaves)

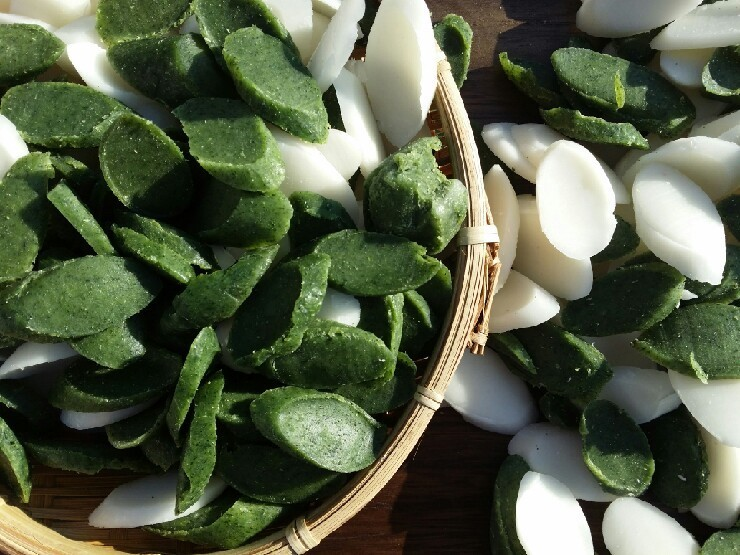
Coastal hogfennel rice cakes for tteokguk (rice cake soup)

=== Japan ===
In Japan, Peucedanum japonicum is known to support longevity and have medicinal properties, and its Japanese name, chomeiso (長命草), translates to 'long-life grass'. It is served in traditional Japanese dishes during shirayoi (the naming ceremony for a newborn) and yahnuyoi (celebration for the completion of a new house). Yonaguni Island accounts for over 90% of the herb's production in Okinawa and could become another significant medicinal crop for Okinawa, following turmeric and aloe. Cosmetics company Shiseido markets P. japonicum as a health food, Shiseido Longevity Herb, in the form of tablets, a powder and a drink. Okinawans have a longer lifespan and lower incidence of cancer compared to the Japanese mainland. Some believe this longevity to be due to dietary factors, however the exact reasons have yet to be verified. In ancient times, P. japonicum leaves and roots were used as a medicine treatment for patients with sore throat in the Ryukyu Islands.

=== China ===
People of China pronounce P. japonicum as bin hai qian hu (滨海前胡). Its older name was fang kui (防葵).

Feverish people should not take it because it causes one to be delirious and see spirits. - Tao Hongjing (456-536 C.E.) - Taoist mediator of Maoshan and follower of Ge Hong - writing in 510 C.E.

In contrast to the Korean culinary uses listed above, the plant was considered in China to be medicinal but possibly deleterious to health and likely to cause delirium in those who consumed it in quantity:

Fang k'uei, if taken in excess, makes one become delirious and act somewhat as though mad. Ch'en Yen-chih / Chen Yanzhi (陳延之) 5th Century C.E.

The plant referred in Taoist alchemical texts may be referring to Saposhnikovia divaricata (syn. Siler divaricata - Schultes and Hofmann mention another putative hallucinogen with a role in Taoist alchemy) rather than P. japonicum. Taoist sage Tao Hongjing speaks of two kinds of fang-feng (which normally refers to Saposhnikovia in Chinese), noting :

The root is spicy and non-poisonous. The kind that bifurcates at the top produces madness. The kind that bifurcates at the bottom causes reversion of old ailments.

'Spicy and non-poisonous' accords well with the culinary use of P. japonicum in Korean cuisine, whereas 'bifurcates at the top' and 'produces madness' accords with the morphology and medicinal/toxic properties of S. divaricata. However, as fang k'uei, P. japonicum is definitely used for medicinal as well as culinary purposes in China, where it is employed as an 'eliminative', diuretic, tussive, sedative and tonic.

Ming Dynasty pharmacologist Li Shizhen was likewise of the opinion that P. japonicum was, although medicinal, not toxic in itself, maintaining that the hallucinogenic properties of the drug were probably a result of its adulteration with material derived from Aconitum or Euphorbia species.

In a mice model, the plant was found to possibly inhibit high fat diet-induced obesity for various possible reasons, including the presence of anti-obesity phytochemicals, which inhibit fat absorption through gene expression in the liver, adipose tissue and muscle.

== See also ==
- Hallucinogenic plants in Chinese herbals
