= Glehn Castle =

Manor in Tallinn, Estonia

Coordinates: 59°23′15″N 24°39′14″E

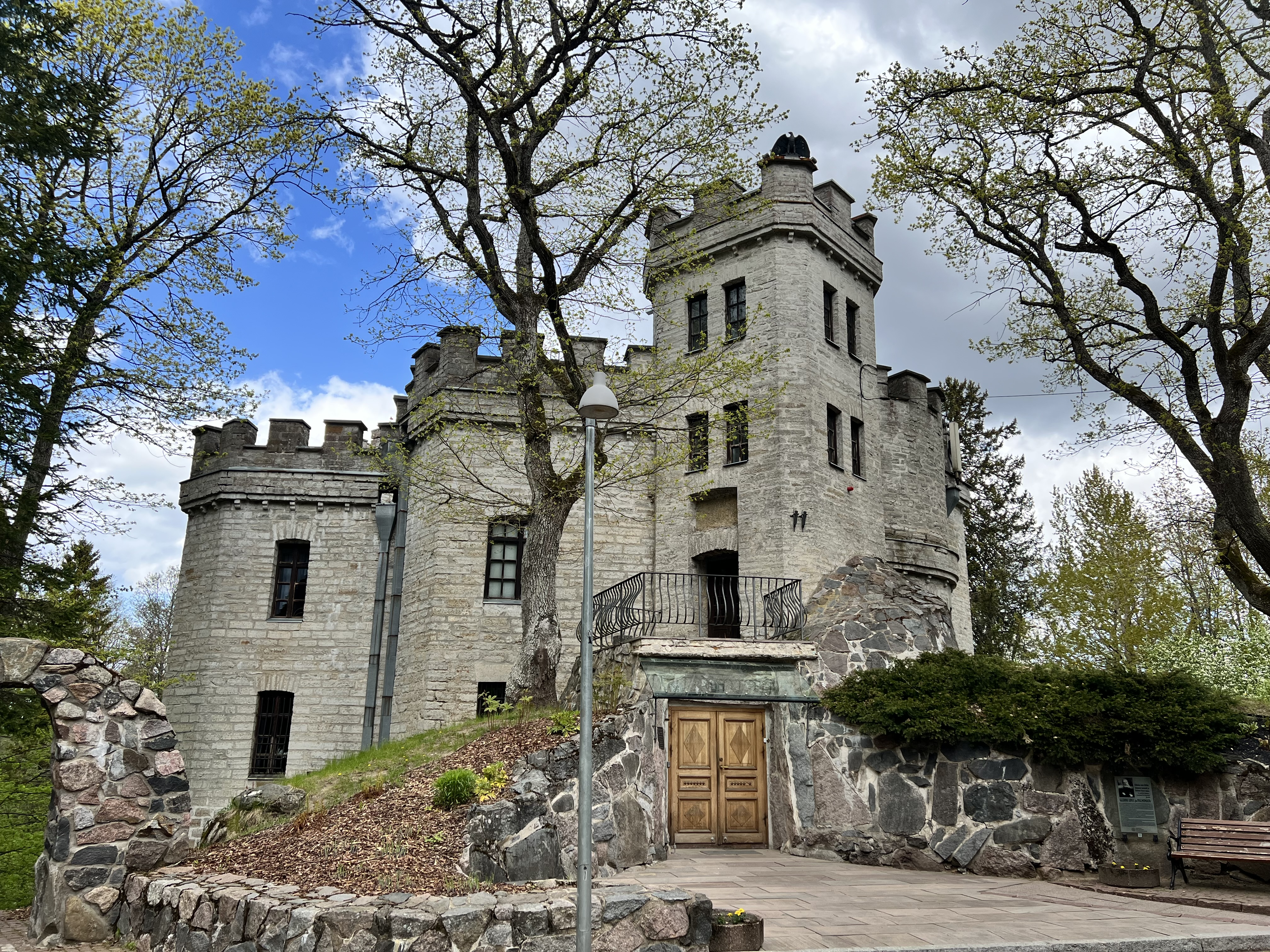
Glehn Castle

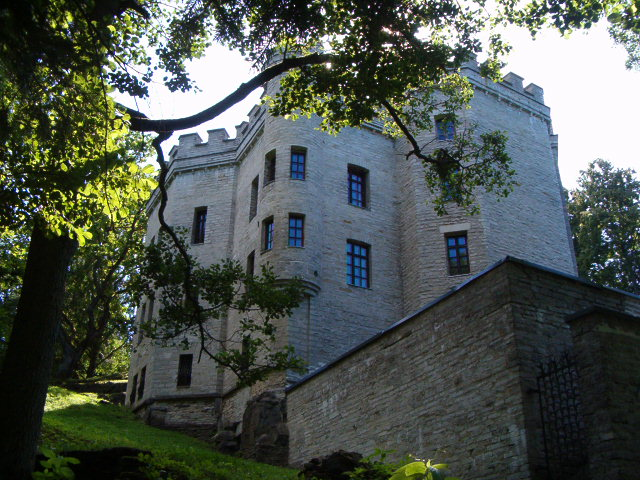

Glehn Castle (Estonian: Glehni loss, also Mustamäe Manor, German: Hohenhaupt) is a castle on the hillside of Nõmme, part of Tallinn, Estonia.

== History ==
The manor was designed and established by Nikolai von Glehn on the northern part of the lands of his Jälgimäe Manor to become his new residence. The castle was completed in 1886. The castle is surrounded by a park with several buildings such as a palm house (1900–1910) and observatory tower (1910), and the sculptures Kalevipoeg (1908) and Crocodile (1908), all of which were also designed by Glehn himself.

After Glehn emigrated to Germany in 1918, the castle was looted and fell into decline. In the 1960s, restoration of the building commenced. The renovated palace was inaugurated on the 24 March 1977.

== In popular culture ==
The film The Hound of the Baskervilles (Russian: Приключения Шерлока Холмса и доктора Ватсона: Собака Баскервилей) was shot around the castle in 1981.

== Gallery ==
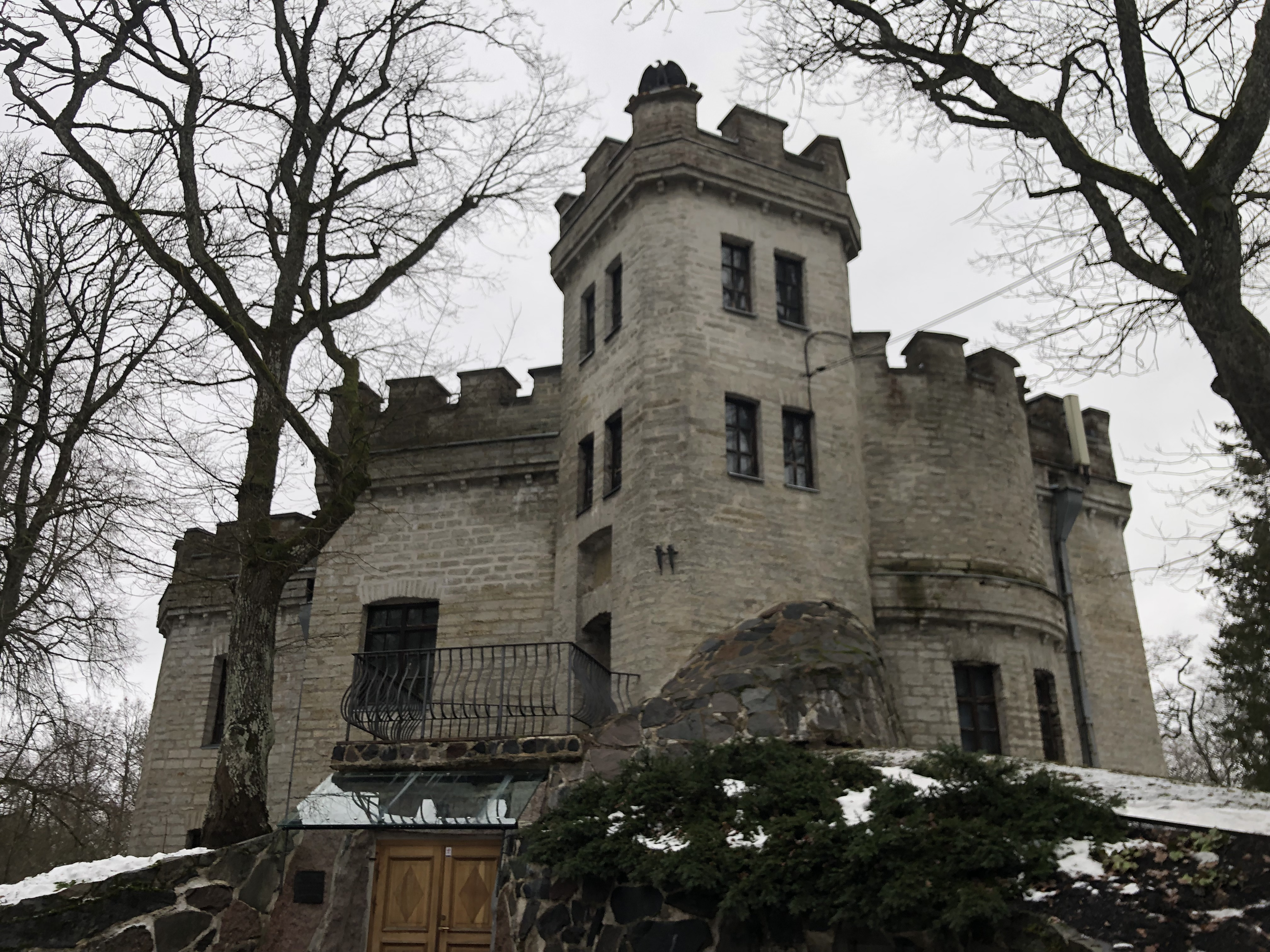
The castle

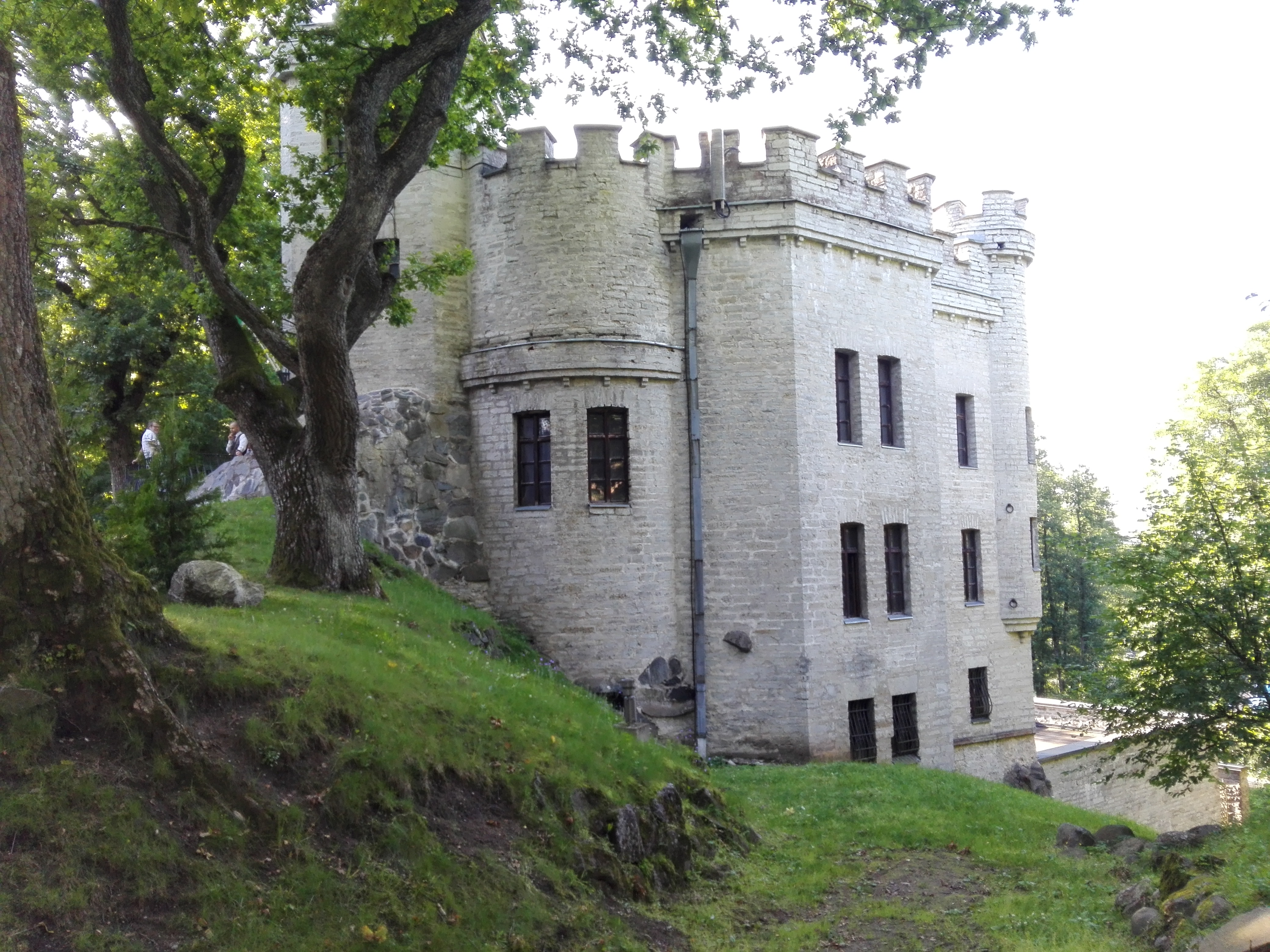
Side view

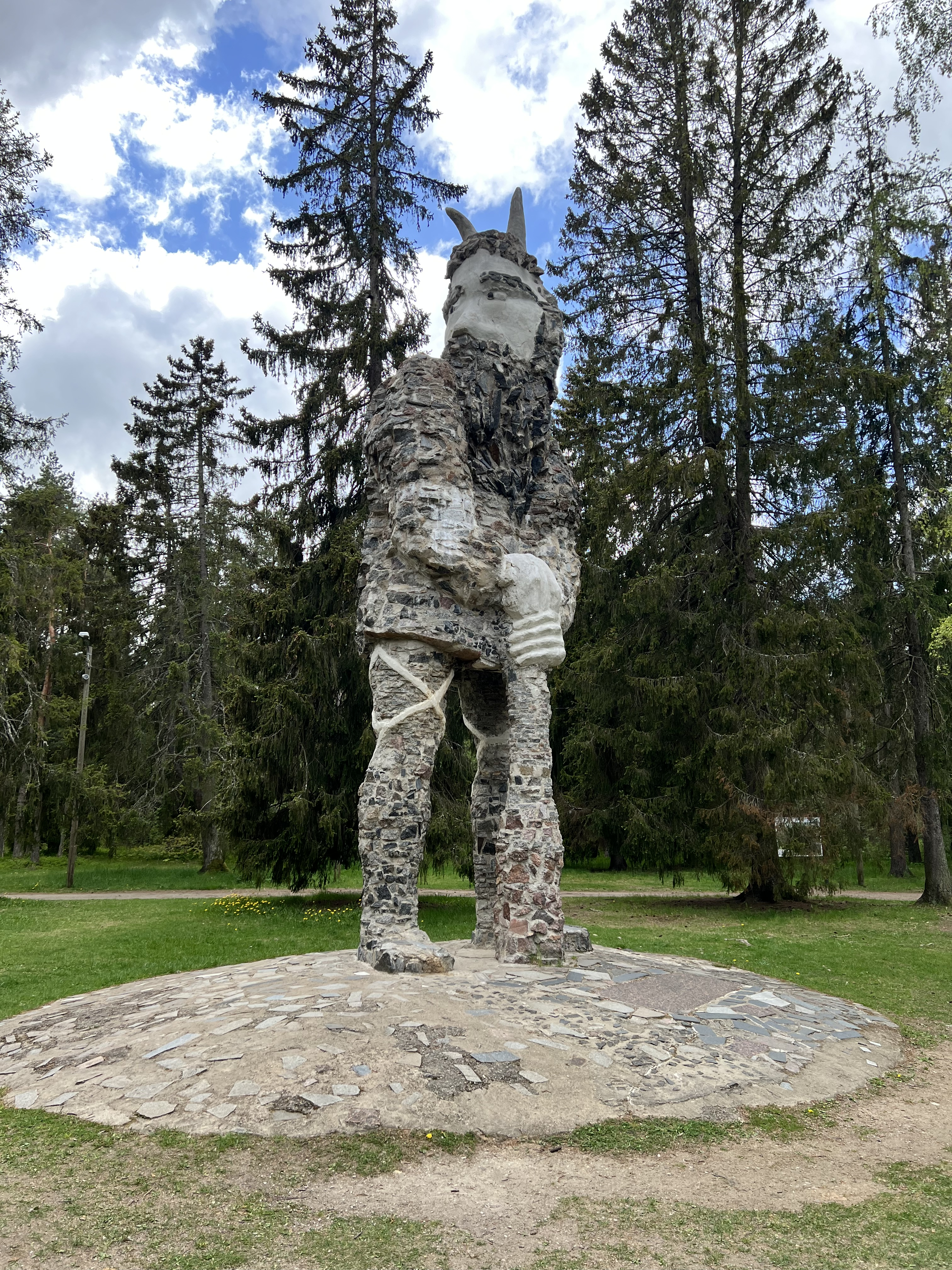
Glehn's Kalevipoeg sculpture

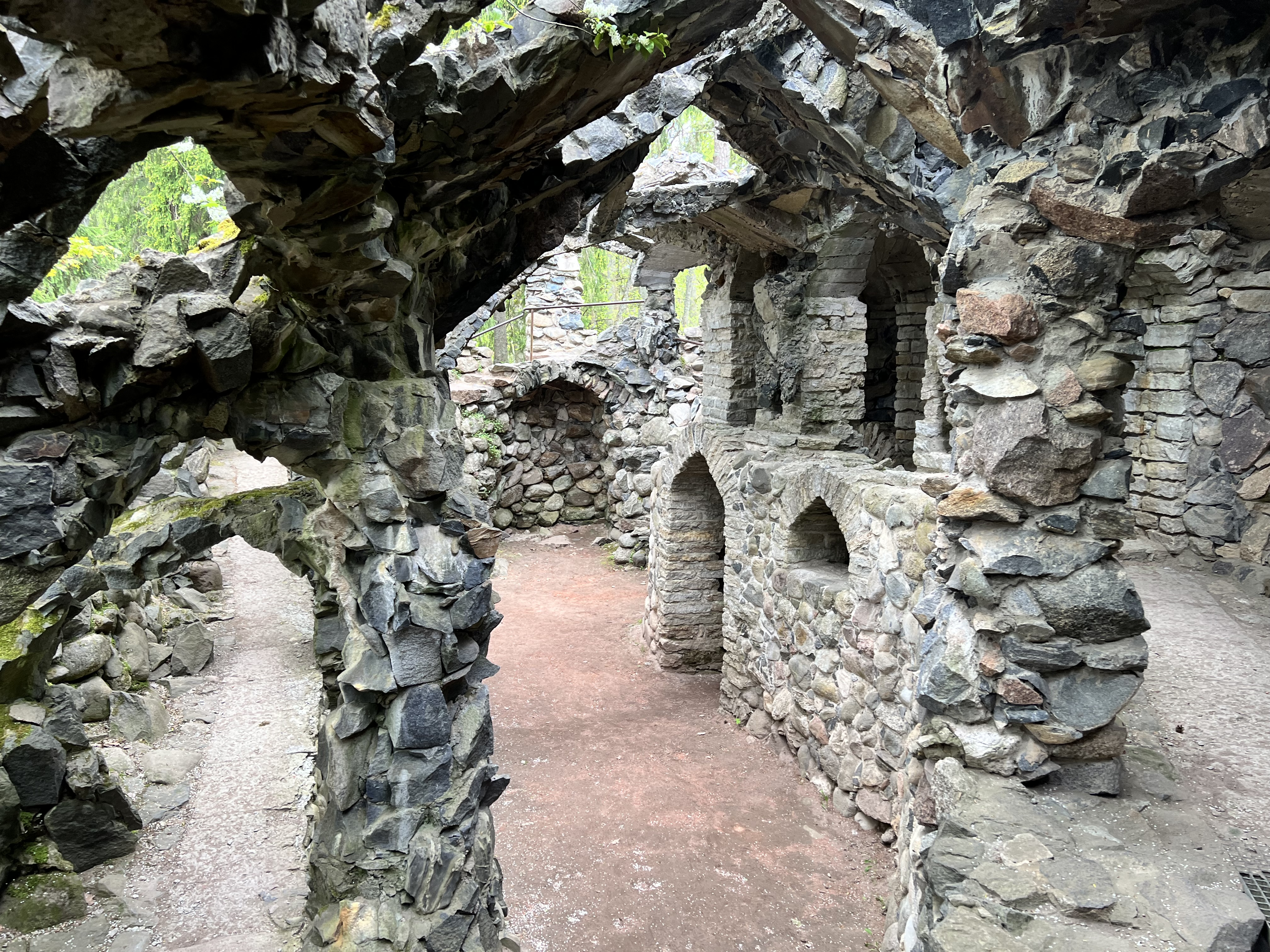
Inside the palm house

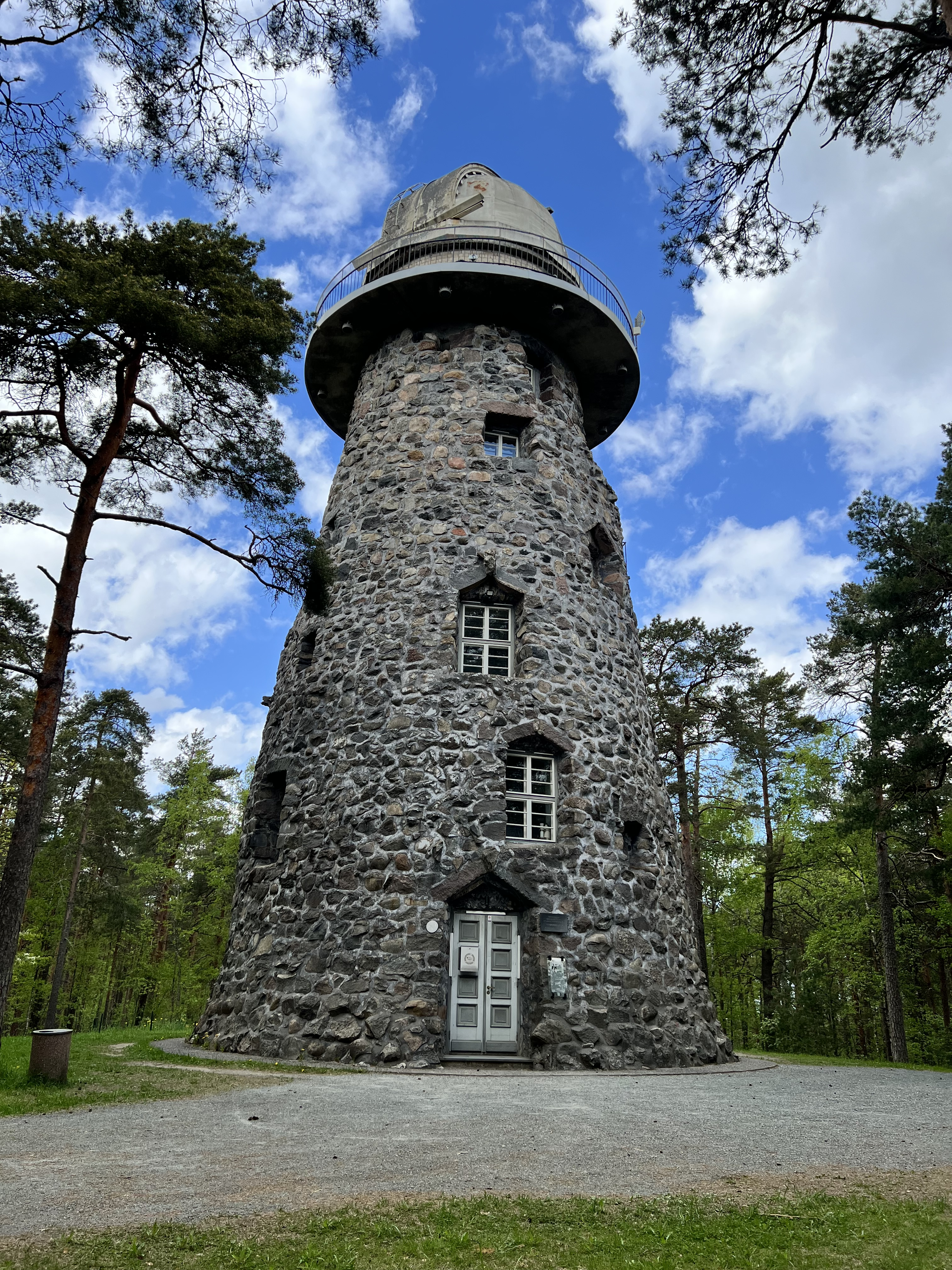
Glehn's lookout tower, now used as the Tallinn Observatory

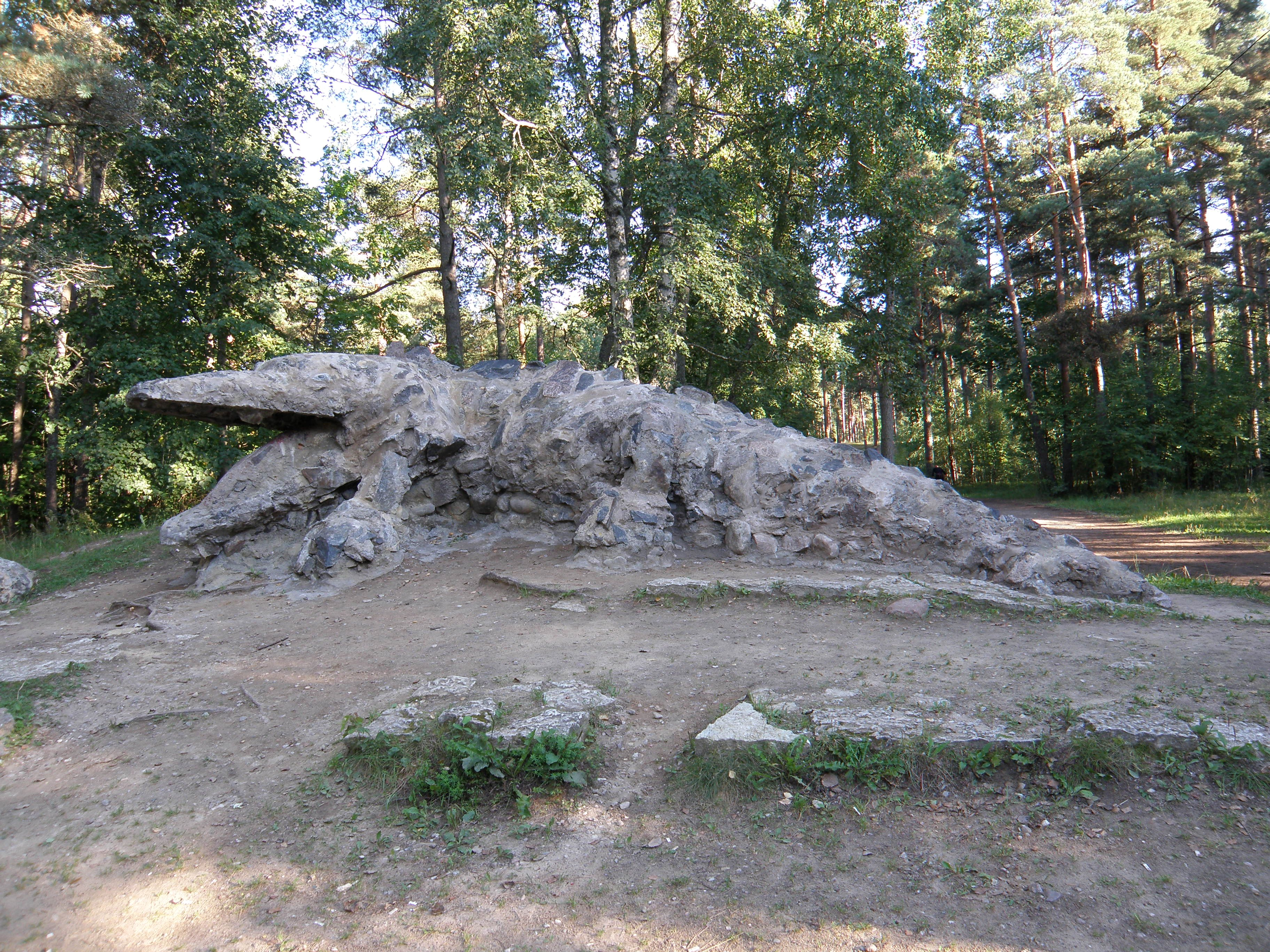
Glehn's Crocodile sculpture

== See also ==
- List of palaces and manor houses in Estonia
