= Hallucinogenic plants in Chinese herbals =

For over two millennia, texts in Chinese herbology and traditional Chinese medicine have recorded medicinal plants that are also hallucinogens and psychedelics. Some are familiar psychoactive plants in Western herbal medicine (e.g., Chinese: 莨菪; pinyin: làngdàng, i.e. Hyoscyamus niger), but several Chinese plants have not been noted as hallucinogens in modern works (e.g.,Chinese: 雲實; pinyin: yúnshí; lit. 'cloud seed', i.e. Caesalpinia decapetala). Chinese herbals are an important resource for the history of botany, for instance, Zhang Hua's c. 290 Bowuzhi is the earliest record of the xiàojùn 笑菌 (lit. "laughing mushroom", potentially a psilocybin-constraining species).

== Terminology ==
There is a lexical gap between Chinese names and descriptions of hallucinogenic plants and English pharmacological terminology for hallucinogens, which Western pharmacology commonly divides into psychedelics, dissociatives, and deliriants.

The English lexicon has a complex semantic field for psychoactive drugs, and most terms are neologisms. (Note: The following definitions are from Lathrop, Thomas, ed. (2008), Stedman's Medical Dictionary, 28th edition, Hubsta.)

The equivalent semantic field in the Chinese lexicon comprises contemporary loanwords. (Note: Translation equivalents are primarily from Wenlin v. 4.3, 2016).) Huànjué (幻覺; "hallucination; delusion; illusion") compounds huàn (幻; "unreal; imaginary; illusory") and jué (覺; "feeling; sensation; perception"). Zhìhuànjì (致幻劑; "psychedelic; hallucinogen") compounds zhì (致; "incur; cause"); huàn ("unreal; imaginary; illusory"); and jì (劑; "medicinal preparation; dose"). Zhìhuànyào (致幻藥; "hallucinogenic drug") with yào (藥; "medicine; drug") is a less common synonym.

Míhuànyàowù (迷幻藥物; "psychedelic") combines míhuàn (迷幻; "phantasmagoric; surreal; mysterious; psychedelic") and yàowù (藥物; "medicine; pharmaceutical; medicament"). The Chinese technical names for the last two classes of hallucinogens are rare: Yóulíyàopǐn (游离藥品; "dissociative") compounds yóulí (游离; "dissociated; drifting") and yàopǐn (藥品; "medicine; chemical reagent; drug"); and Zhìzhānwàngyào (致谵妄藥; "deliriant") combines zhì "incur; cause", zhānwàng (譫妄; "(medical) delirium"), and yào "medicine; drug".

== History ==
Chinese pharmaceutical literature mainly comprises texts called běncǎo (本草; pen-ts'ao)), translatable as English herbal, pharmacopoeia, or materia medica. This word compounds ben "(plant) root/stem; basis, origin; foundation; book" and cao "grass; herb; straw". Although bencao is sometimes misinterpreted as "roots and herbs", the approximate meaning is "[pharmaceutics whose] basis [ben] [is] herbs [cao]". These works deal with drugs of all origins, mainly vegetable but also mineral, animal, and even the human body.

The Chinese botanist, academic, and researcher Hui-lin Li (1911–2002) wrote seminal articles about the history and use of hallucinogenic plants in China. Li cites a story in Li Shizhen's 1596 magnum opus Bencao gangmu as the first discussion about the general use of psychoactive plants. In 1561, after horrific murders in Changli, the Ming dynasty Jiajing Emperor proclaimed a nationwide edict warning about the dangers of hallucinogens.

Lang-tang (Hyoscyamus niger), Yün-shih (Caesalpinia Sepiaria), Fang-k'uei (Peucedanum japonica) and Red Shanglu (Phytolacca acinosa) all can cause hallucination in peoples. In the past, this significance has not been fully divulged. Plants of this kind are all toxic, which can obscure the mind, alter one's consciousness, and confuse one's perception of sight and sound. In the T'ang times, An Lu-shan [a foreign warlord in the Chinese army service] once enticed the Kitan [tribesmen surrendered to his command] to drink Lang-tang wine and buried them alive while they were unconscious. Again in the second month of the 43rd year of the Chia-ch'in period (1561 A.D.), a wandering monk, Wu Ju-hsiang of Shensi province, who possessed wizardry, arrived at Ch'ang-li and stopped over at the house of a resident, Chang Shu. Upon finding the latter's wife being very beautiful, he asked that the entire family sit together at the table with him when he was being offered a meal. He put some reddish potion in the rice and after a while the whole family became unconscious and submitted to his assault. He then blew a magic spell into the ears of Chang Shu and the latter turned crazy and violent. Chang visualized his entire family as all devils and thereby killed them all, sixteen altogether, without any blood shed. The local authorities captured Chang Shu and kept him in prison. After ten days, he spat out nearly two spittoonsful of phlegm, became conscious, and found out himself that those he killed were his parents, brothers, sisters-in-law, his wife, sons, sisters, nephews. Both Chang and Wu were committed to the death sentence. The Emperor, Shih-tsung, proclaimed throughout the country about the case. The particular magic potion must be of the kind of Lang-tang or similar drugs. When the man was under the spell, he saw everyone else as a devil. It is thus very important to find out the remedy that counteracts such a thing.

== Notable plants ==
The following eight examples of confirmed and possible hallucinogens recorded in Chinese herbals are primarily based on the ten in Li Hui-Lin's 1977 article. Two edible plants, with only one Chinese source and no Western ones mentioning psychoactive properties, are omitted as unlikely: fángfēng (防风; 防風; fang-feng; "Saposhnikovia divaricata; Chinese parsnip") and lónglì (龙荔; 龍荔; lung-li; "Nephelium topengii"; a type of lychee").

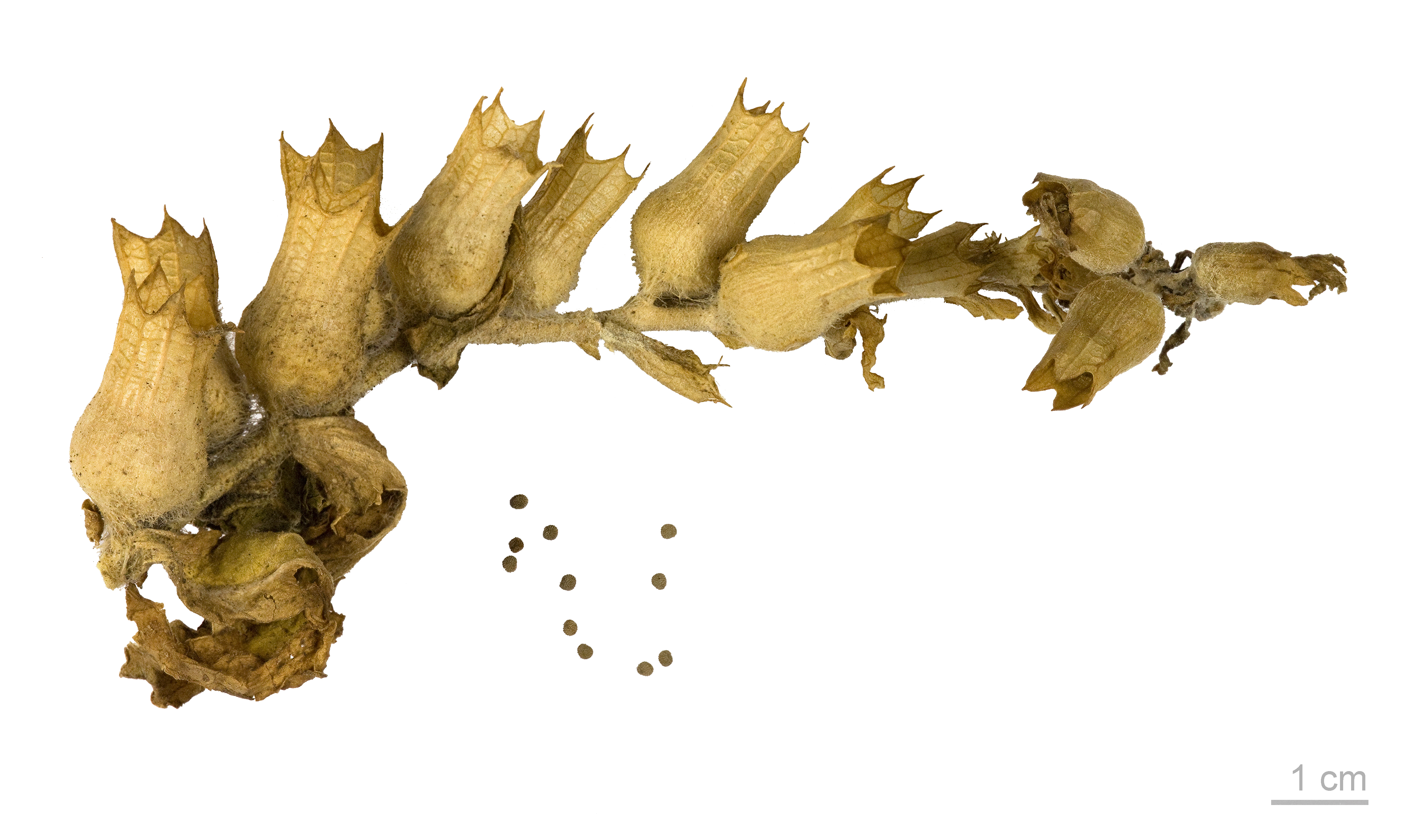
Hyoscyamus niger fruit and seeds

Caesalpinia decapetala flowers

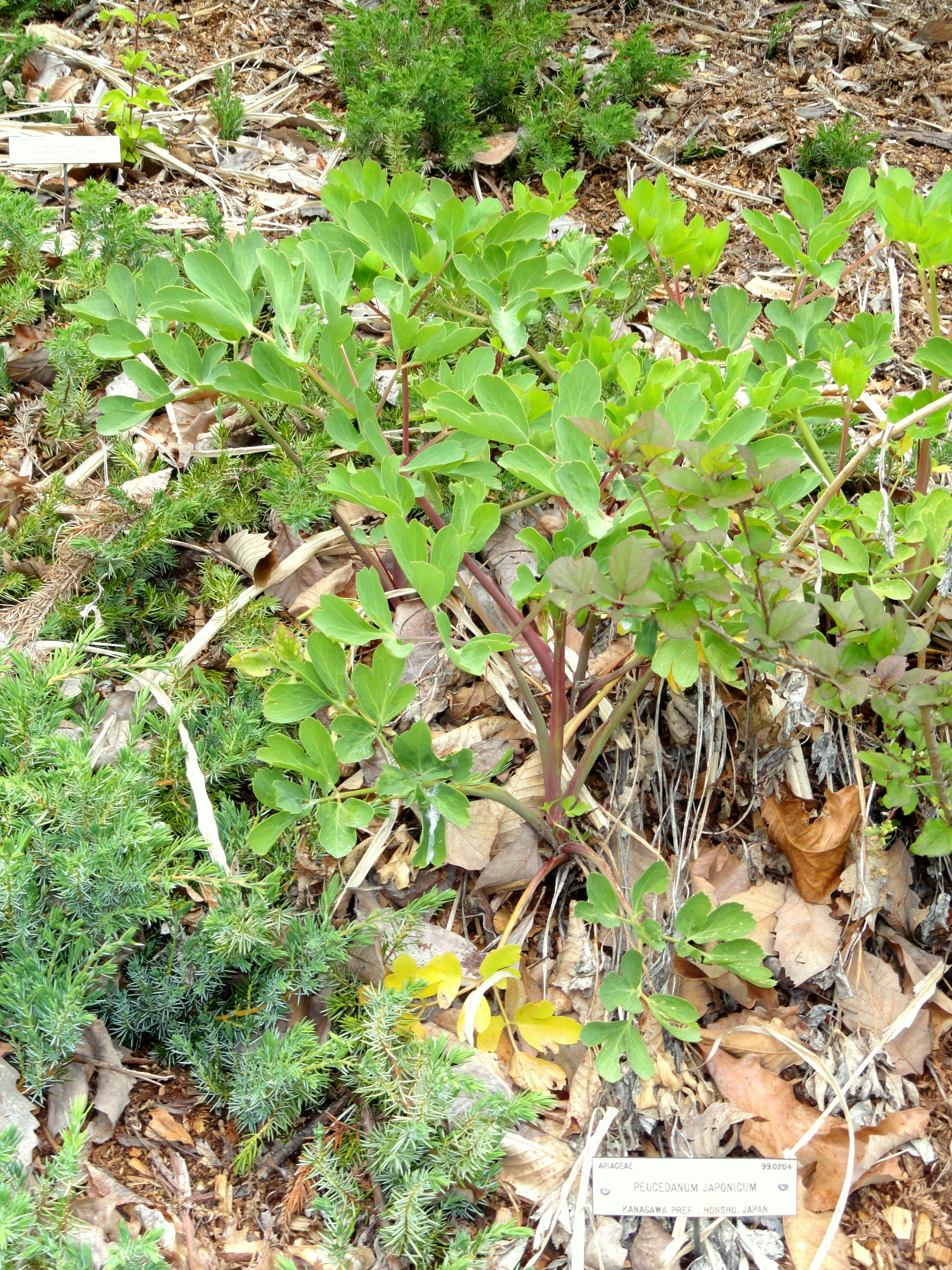
Peucedanum japonicum

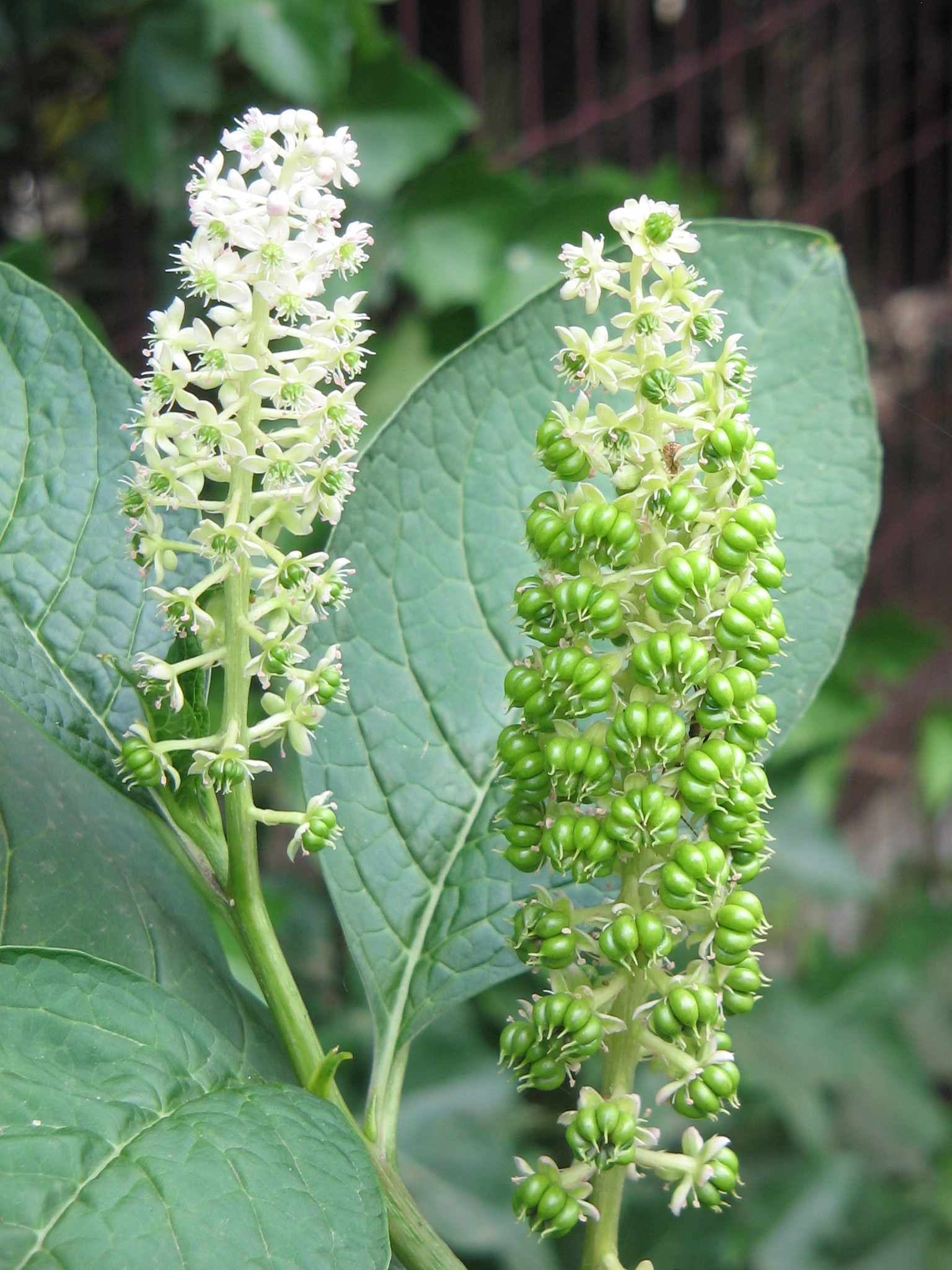
Phytolacca acinosa flowers

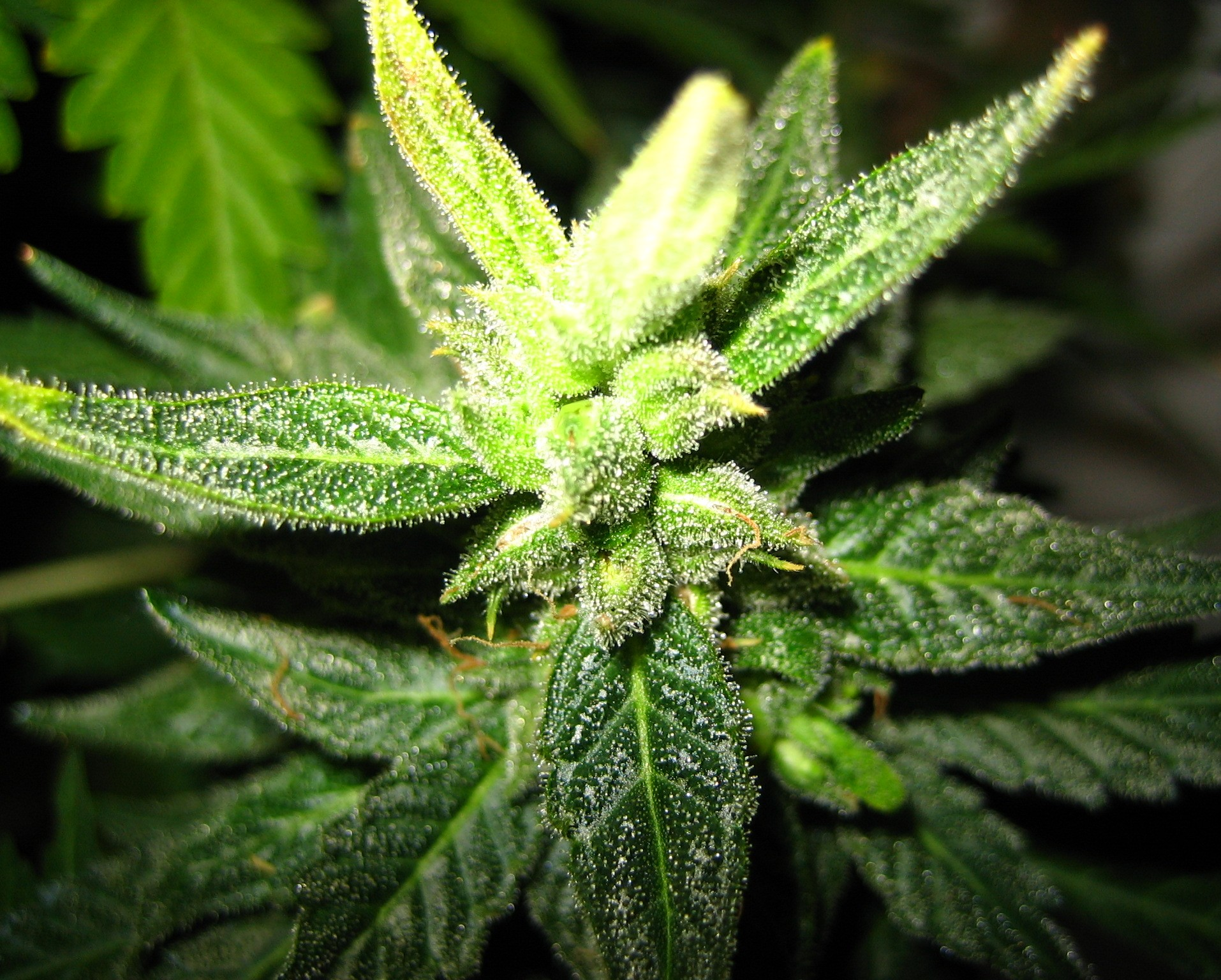
Cannabis sativa flowers

=== Langdang: Hyoscyamus niger ===
The làngdàng (莨菪; lang-tang; "Hyoscyamus niger; black henbane") is one of the most famous hallucinogenic drugs in Chinese herbals. The seeds, which contain psychoactive tropane alkaloids, are called làngdàngzi (莨菪子, with -zi "child; seed") or tiānxiānzi (天仙子; "heavenly transcendent seeds").

For use in medicine, the seeds are supposedly treated by soaking in vinegar and milk to reduce their toxicity. The Shennong Bencaojing says, "[The seeds] when taken [when properly prepared] for a prolonged period enable one to walk for long distances, benefiting to the mind and adding to the strength ... and to communicate with spirits and seeing devils. When taken in excess, it causes one to stagger madly." Lei Xiao's 470 Leigong paozhilun (雷公炮炙論; "Master Lei's Treatise on the Decoction and Preparation of Drugs") states that the seed "is extremely poisonous, and when accidentally taken, it causes delirium and seeing sparks and flashes", and Zhen Chuan's c. 620 Bencao yaoxing (本草藥性; "Nature of Drugs in Materia Medica") says the seeds "should not be taken raw as it hurts people, causing them to see devils, acting madly like picking needles".

=== Yunshi: Caesalpinia decapetala ===
The yúnshí (云实; 雲實; yun-shih; "Caesalpinia decapetala; cat's claw") was a versatile drug plant in the Chinese pharmacopeia, and the root, flowers, and seeds were all used in medicine.

The Shennong Bencao says, "[The flowers] could enable one to see spirits, and when taken in excess, cause one to stagger madly. If taken over a prolonged period, they produce somatic levitation and effect communication with spirits." Tao Hongjing, who edited the official Shangqing Daoist canon, also compiled the c. 510 Mingyi bielu (名醫別錄; "Supplementary Records of Famous Physicians") that says "[The flowers] will drive away evil spirits. When put in water and burned, spirits can be summoned" and "The seeds are like langdang (Hyoscyamus niger), if burned, spirits can be summoned; but this [sorcery] method has not been observed."

Li Hui-Lin notes this plant "has not been noted as a hallucinogenic plant in modern works. In fact, as far as I am aware, it has not been investigated medicinally or chemically".

=== Fangkui: Peucedanum japonicum ===
The fángkuí (防葵; fang-k'ui; "Peucedanum japonicum") root is used in Chinese medicine, and like the previous cat's claw, has not been noted as a hallucinogenic in modern works. The c. 510 Tao Hongjing mingyi bielu states, "Feverish people should not take it, because it causes one to be delirious and see spirits"; and Chen Yanzhi's (陳延之) c. 454-473 Xiaoping fang (小品方; "Minor Prescriptions") says that fangkui, "if taken in excess, makes one become delirious and act somewhat like mad".

P. japonicum is also used quite extensively in Korean cuisine - not only as a culinary herb, but also as a leaf vegetable, raising the question as to what constitutes consumption 'to excess'. It may be the case that the strain of plant grown in Korea is less toxic / medicinal than that found in China, or that very substantial quantities of the plant must be eaten before any psychoactive effects are manifested. Alternatively, the psychoactive components of the plant may be deactivated by the cooking processes employed in the preparation of the plant in Korea.

=== Shanglu: Phytolacca acinosa ===
The shānglù (商陆; 商陸; shang-lu; "Phytolacca acinosa; India pokeweed") has edible leaves and poisonous roots. China's oldest extant dictionary, the c. 3rd-century BCE Erya (13: 110) gives two names for pokeweed: chùtāng (蓫薚) and mǎwěi (馬尾; "horsetail").

Chinese herbals distinguish two kinds of shanglu, white with white flowers and white root, and red with red flowers and purple root. The white root is edible when cooked but the red root is extremely poisonous. The Tao Hongjing mingyi bielu records how Daoists used the red variety, "By boiling or brewing and then taken, it can be used for abdominal parasitic worms and for seeing spirits"; Su Song's 1061 Bencao tujing (本草圖經; "Illustrated Pharmacopeia") says, "It was much used by sorcerers in ancient times". Su Gong's 659 Tang bencao (唐本草; "Tang dynasty pharmacopeia") says "The red kind can be used to summon spirits; it is very poisonous. It can be only used as external application for inflammation. When ingested, it is extremely harmful, causing unceasing bloody stool. It may be fatal. It causes one to see spirits."

The 1406 Jiuhuang Bencao "Famine Relief Herbal" lists pokeweed as a famine food. It gives instructions for removing the poisonous phytolaccatoxin from the white roots and mentions Daoist xian using the flowers: "Cut them up into slices, scald, then soak and wash repeatedly (throwing away the extract) until the material is clean; then just eat it with garlic. … Plants with white flowers can (it is said) confer longevity; the immortals collected them to make savouries to take with their wine."

=== Dama: Cannabis sativa ===
Dàmá (大麻; ta-ma; "Cannabis sativa; hemp; marijuana") has been grown in China since Neolithic times. At a very early period the Chinese recognized the Cannabis plant as dioecious, the male plants produce better fibers and the female plants produce more cannabinoids. In modern usage, the names are xǐ (枲; "male cannabis") and jū (苴; "female cannabis").

Reflecting the importance of cannabis in ancient China, the ca. 3rd century BCE Erya dictionary (13) has four definitions: fén (黂; 蕡) and xǐshí (枲實) mean "cannabis flower"; xǐ (枲) and má (麻) mean "cannabis" generally and not "male cannabis"; fú (莩; 'reed membrane') and mámǔ (麻母; "cannabis mother") mean "female cannabis"; and bò (薜) and shānmá (山麻; "mountain cannabis") mean "wild cannabis", possibly C. ruderalis.

The Shennong bencao calls "cannabis flowers/buds" mafen (麻蕡)) or mabo (麻勃) and says: "To take much makes people see demons and throw themselves about like maniacs [多食令人見鬼狂走]. But if one takes it over a long period of time one can communicate with the spirits, and one's body becomes light [久服通神明輕身]". The Mingyi bielu records that in the 6th century, mabo were, "very little used in medicine, but the magician-technicians [shujia (術家)] say that if one consumes them with ginseng it will give one preternatural knowledge of events in the future." Meng Shen's c. 670 Shiliao bencao (食療本草; "Nutritional Therapy Pharmacopeia") says people will combine equal parts of raw cannabis flowers, Japanese sweet flag, and wild mandrake, "pound them into pills of the size of marbles and take one facing the sun every day. After one hundred days, one can see spirits." Tang Shengwei's 1108 Zhenglei bencao (證類本草; "Reorganized Pharmacopeia") gives a more complete account on the pharmaceutical uses of cannabis: "Ma-fen has a spicy taste; it is toxic; it is used for waste diseases and injuries; it clears blood and cools temperature; it relieves fluxes; it undoes rheumatism; it discharges pus. If taken in excess, it produces hallucinations and a staggering gait. If taken over a long term, it causes one to communicate with spirits and lightens one's body."

According to the sinologists and historians Joseph Needham and Lu Gwei-djen, some early Daoists adapted censers for the religious and spiritual use of cannabis. The c. 570 Daoist encyclopedia Wushang Biyao (無上秘要; "Supreme Secret Essentials") recorded adding cannabis into ritual censers, and they suggest Yang Xi (330-c. 386), who wrote the Shangqing scriptures during alleged visitations by Daoist xian, was "aided almost certainly by cannabis".

=== Mantuolou: Datura stramonium ===
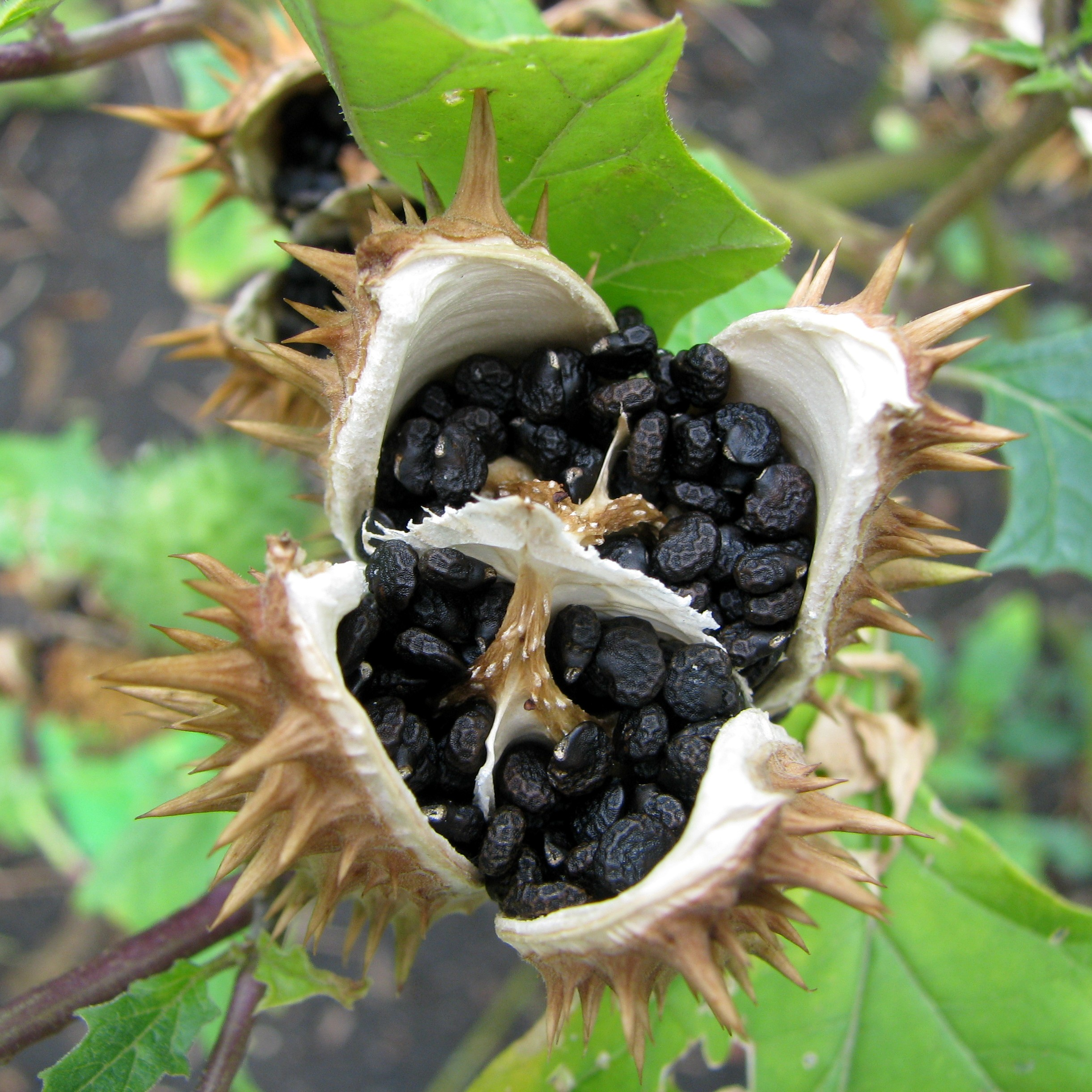
Datura stramonium fruit and seeds

The màntuóluó (曼陀罗; 曼陀羅; man-t'o-lo; "Datura stramonium; jimsonweed" or "(Buddhism) mandala") contains highly toxic Tropane alkaloids. Several Datura species were introduced into China from India, and Li Shizhen's 1596 Bencao gangmu was the first herbal to record the medicinal use of flowers and seeds. The drug is used in combination with Cannabis sativa and taken with wine as an anesthetic for small operations and cauterizations. Li Shizhen personally experimented with jimsonweed and recorded his experience as follows: "According to traditions, it is alleged that when the flowers are picked for use with wine while one is laughing, the wine will cause one to produce laughing movements; and when the flowers are picked while one is dancing, the wine will cause one to produce dancing movements. [I have found out] that such movements will be produced when one becomes half-drunk with the wine and someone else laughs or dances to induce these actions."

=== Maogen: Ranunculus japonicus ===
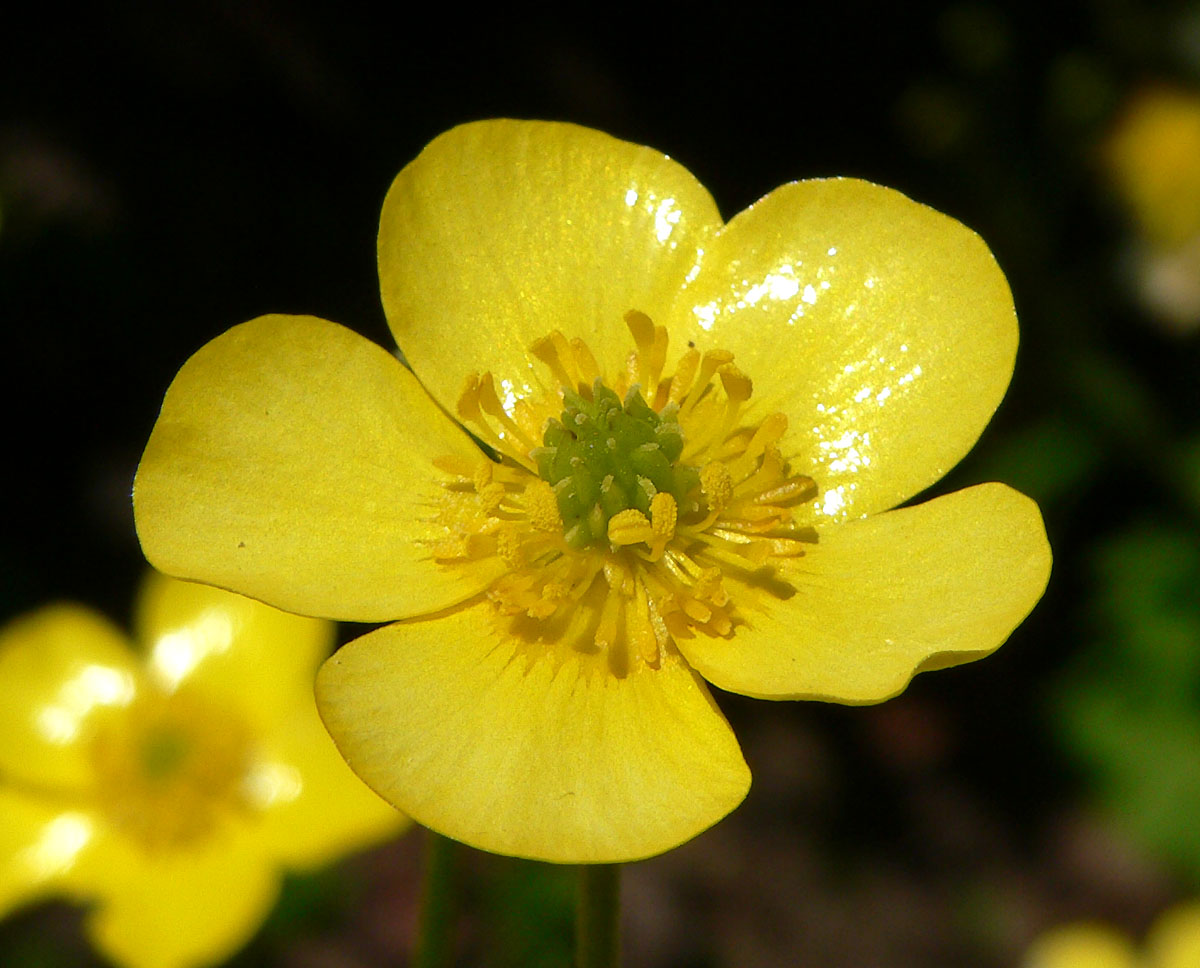
Ranunculus japonicus

The máogèn (毛茛; mao-ken; "Ranunculus japonicus; buttercup") is a poisonous plant with bright yellow flowers. The Daoist alchemist Ge Hong's c. 340 Zhouhou jiuzu fang (肘後救卒方; "Remedies for Emergencie"), says, "Among the herbs there is the Shui Lang (water Lang, a kind of Mao-ken) a plant with rounded leaves which grows along water courses and is eaten by crabs. It is poisonous to man and when eaten by mistake, it produces a maniacal delirium, appearing like a stroke and sometimes with blood-spitting. The remedy is to use licorice." Later herbals, which do not mention maogen as a deliriant, say the whole plant is considered poisonous and is should only be externally used as a medicine for irritation and inflammation.

=== Xiaojun: species unknown ===
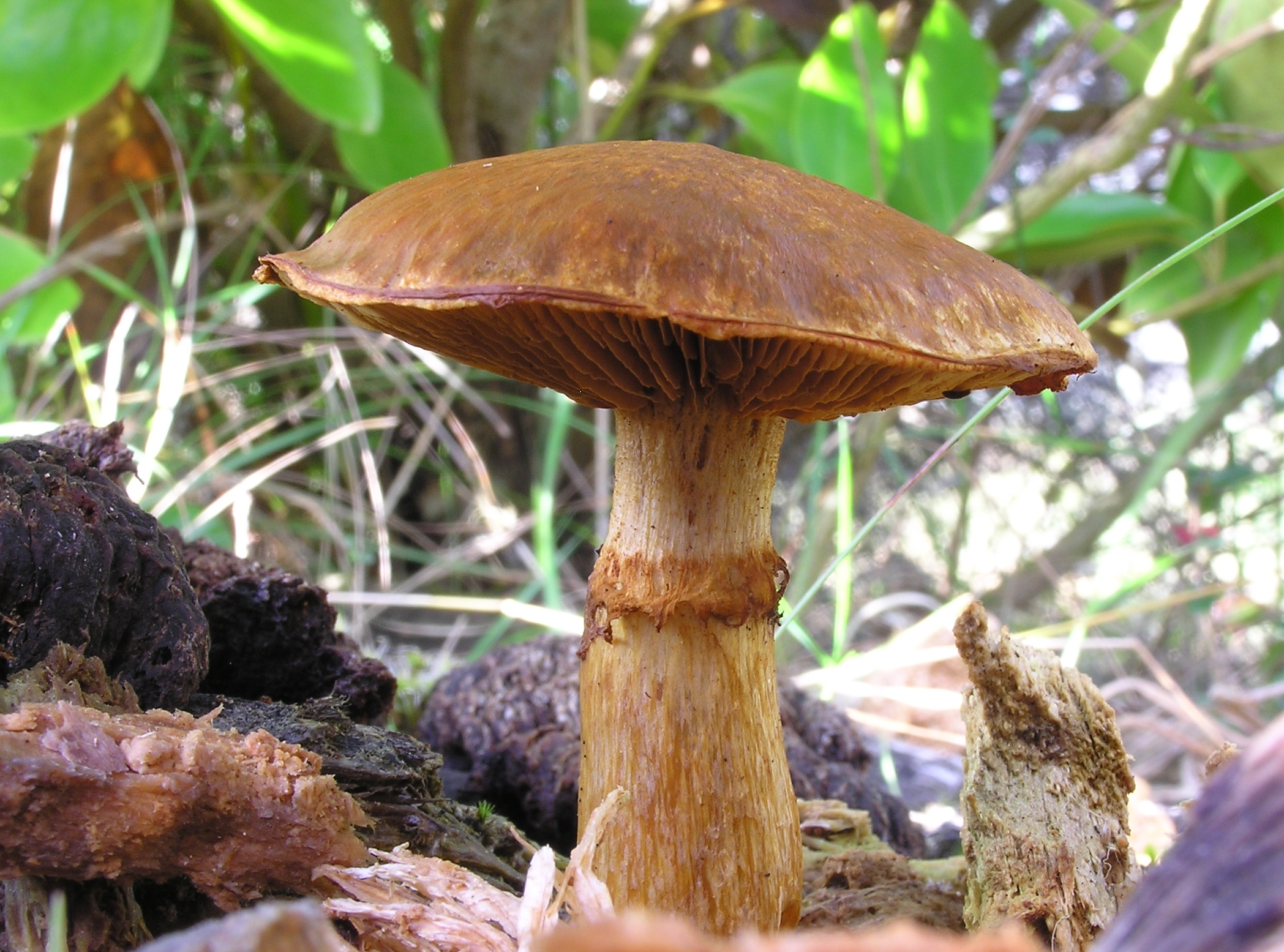
Gymnopilus junonius, a mushroom that grows on sweet gums but does not contain psilocybin

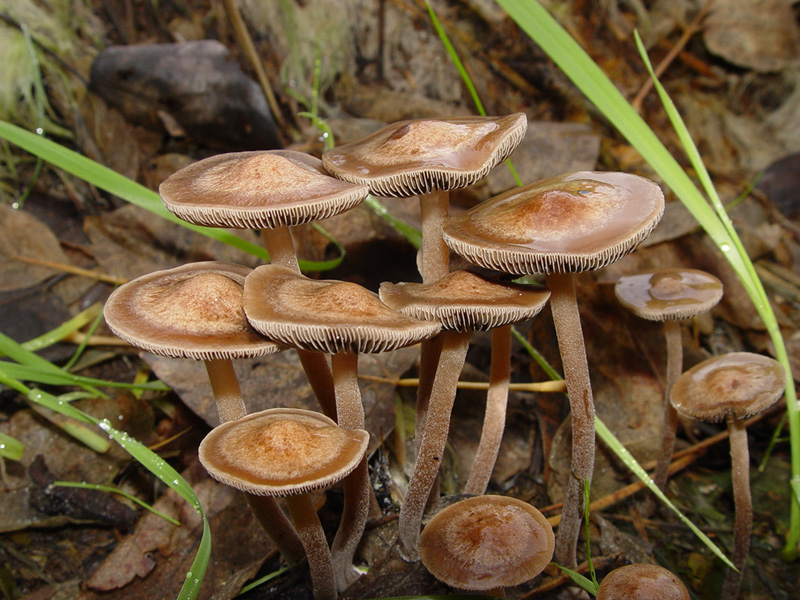
Panaeolus cinctulus, a species of psilocybin mushroom recorded in China

The xiàojùn (笑菌; hsiao-ch'un; "laughing mushroom") refers to fungi recorded in Chinese texts to produce uncontrollable laughter. It is unknown which specific fungi this describes - some sources erroneously name Gymnopilus junonius, which is only weakly psychoactive, potentially due to it having the misleading name "Laughing gym". It is likely that confusion over xiaojun's identity arises from the fact that different historical records are not referring to the same species of mushroom.

The earliest record of a mushroom that causes uncontrollable laughter appears in Zhang Hua's c. 290 Bowuzhi compendium of natural wonders, in a context describing two unusual kinds of {{zhp|p=jùn|c=菌|tr=mushroom; fungus") that grow on tree bark.

In all the mountain commanderies to the South of the Yangzi, there is a fungus which grows [生菌] throughout the spring and summer on the large trees that have fallen down; it is known as the Zhen [椹 "chopping block (for execution)"]. If one eats it, it is tasty, but suddenly the poison takes effect and kills the eater. … If one eats fēng (likely Liquidambar) tree growths [生者], they will induce uncontrollable laughter. If one drinks "earth sauce" [tǔjiāng 土漿] one will recover.

The Bencao gangmu records Tao Hongjing's recipe for preparing "earth sauce": "Dig out a pit three chi deep in a place where there is yellow earth. Take freshly-drawn water and pour it into the pit, stirring the water so as to make it turbid. After a short while, draw off the clear water and use this. It is called either 'soil sauce' or 'earth sauce'." Hui-lin Li quotes a Chinese-language study of "laughing mushrooms" that this "soil infusion" is the clear liquid after soil is mixed with water and allowed to settle, and an effective antidote for poisons.

That the laughter produced by this poison has been recorded as being reliably cured by drinking soiled water suggests that the effect being cured is psychological in nature (i.e. not physically poisonous).

The c. 304 Nanfang Caomu Zhuang mentions sweetgum tree growths in a shamanic context, although it is unclear if this refers to the fungi mentioned in Bowuzhi. The shamans in the southern state of Yue use a magical fēngrén (楓人; "sweetgum person") that is a kind of liúyǐng (瘤癭; "gall") found growing on sweetgum trees. "When aged (the trees) they develop tumors. Sometimes in a violent thunder storm, the tree tumors grow suddenly three to five feet in one night, and these are called Feng-jen. The witches of Yueh collect these for witchcraft, saying that they have proof of their supernatural quality." Later sources gave two explanations of the sweetgum tree growths, either as galls that resemble humans and have magical powers or as parasitic plants with rain-giving powers.

Subsequent Chinese authors give records of lethally poisonous mushrooms that produce laughter. Chen Renyu's (陳仁玉) I245 Jùnpǔ (菌譜; "Mushroom Guidebook") says this fungus is named tǔxùn (土蕈; "earth mushroom") or dùxùn (杜蕈; "pear mushroom") and "grows in the ground. People believe it to be formed by the air from poisonous vermin, and kills people if taken.... Those poisoned by it will laugh. As an antidote, use strong tea, mixed with alum and fresh clear water. Upon swallowing this, it will cure immediately". This appears to refer to a different species to the non-lethal mushroom growing on fēng trees mentioned in Bowuzhi.

In Japan, both medieval and modern sources record laughing mushrooms. An 11th-century story in the Konjaku Monogatarishū describes a group of Buddhist nuns who ate maitake (舞茸 "dancing mushrooms") and began to laugh and dance uncontrollably. It is also known as the waraitake (笑茸 "laughing mushroom"), which scholars have identified as the Panaeolus papilionaceus (despite this species not being psychoactive, unlike other species in the Panaeolus genus); the related Panaeolus cinctulus or Banded Mottlegill; and the Gymnopilus junonius (which is not psychoactive, although other Gymnopilus species are) or Laughing Cap also called ōwaraitake (大笑茸 "Big Laughing Mushroom").

In a study on early Daoist practitioners searching for the elixir of Immortality, Needham and Lu mention the possible use of hallucinogenic plants, such as Amanita muscaria "fly agaric" and xiaojun "laughing mushrooms". Based on Tang dynasty and Song dynasty references, they tentatively identify it as a Panaeolus or Pholiota and suggest that the properties of at least some psychoactive mushrooms were widely known. They predict the further exploration of hallucinogenic fungi and other plants in Daoism and in Chinese culture in general "will be an exciting task".

== See also ==
- List of psilocybin mushrooms
- List of psychedelic drugs
- List of psychoactive plants
- List of psychoactive plants, fungi, and animals
