= Tallinn Observatory =

Observatory in Tallinn, Estonia

Coordinates: 59°23′11″N 24°39′04″E

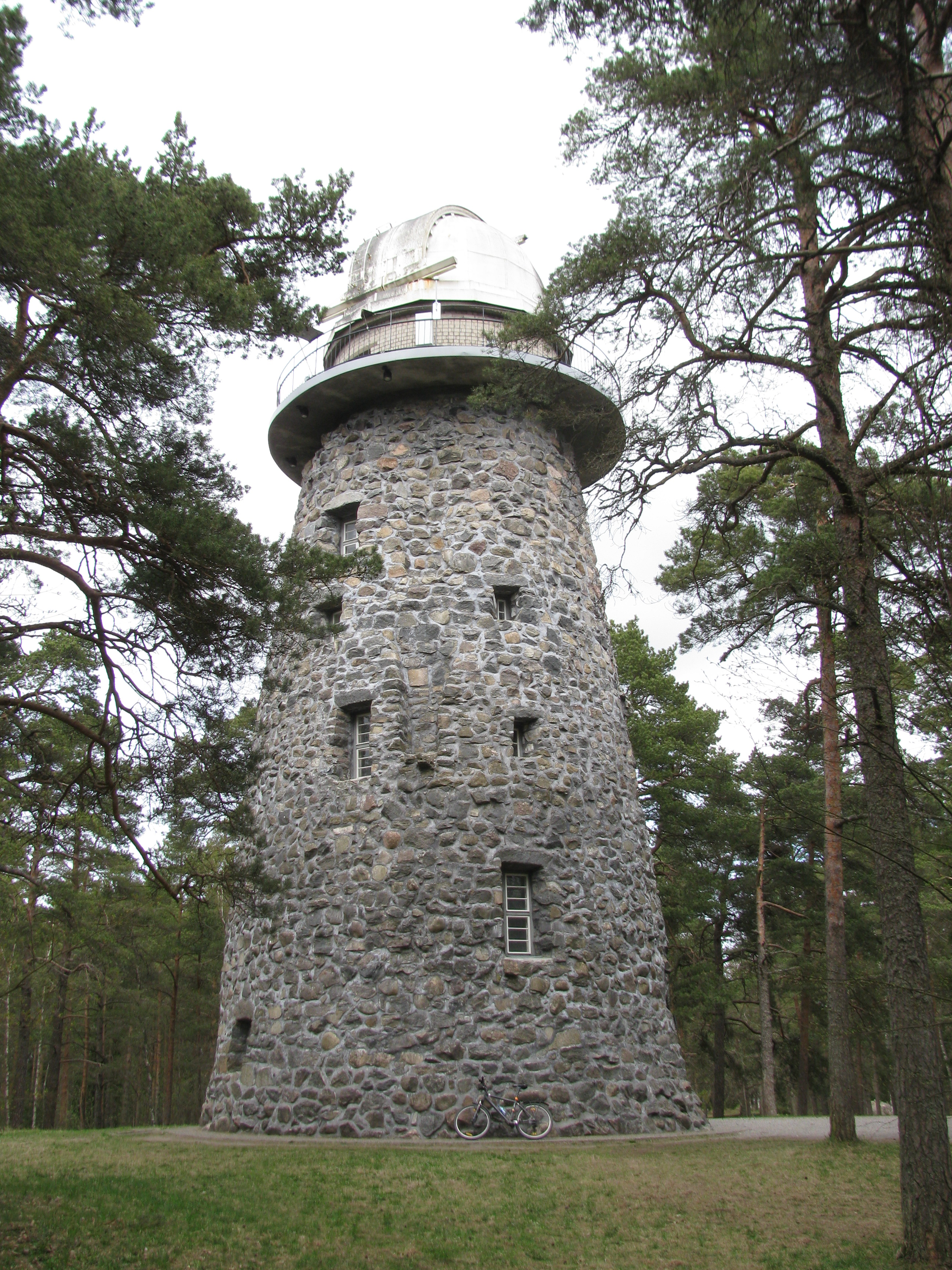
Tallinn Observatory

Tallinn Observatory (Estonian: Tallinna tähetorn) is an observatory in Tallinn, Estonia. Since 1993, the observatory is a part of Tallinn University of Technology.

The observatory was established in 1954. Before using as an observatory, the building was Glehn's lookout tower (see Glehn Castle).

== Directors ==
- 1954-1962 Charles Villmann
- 1962-2002 Peep Kalv
- 2000- Voldemar Harvig

== See also ==
- List of astronomical observatories
