= Jälgimäe =

Village in Estonia

Coordinates: 59°19′N 24°36′E

- Village
- Interactive map of Jälgimäe
- Country: Estonia
- County: Harju County
- Parish: Saku Parish
- Time zone: UTC+2 (EET)
  - Summer (DST): UTC+3 (EEST)

Jälgimäe (German: Jelgimeggi) is a village in Saku Parish, Harju County in northern Estonia.

Botanist Peter von Glehn (1835–1876) and the founder of Nõmme Nikolai von Glehn (1841–1923) were born in Jälgimäe Manor.
