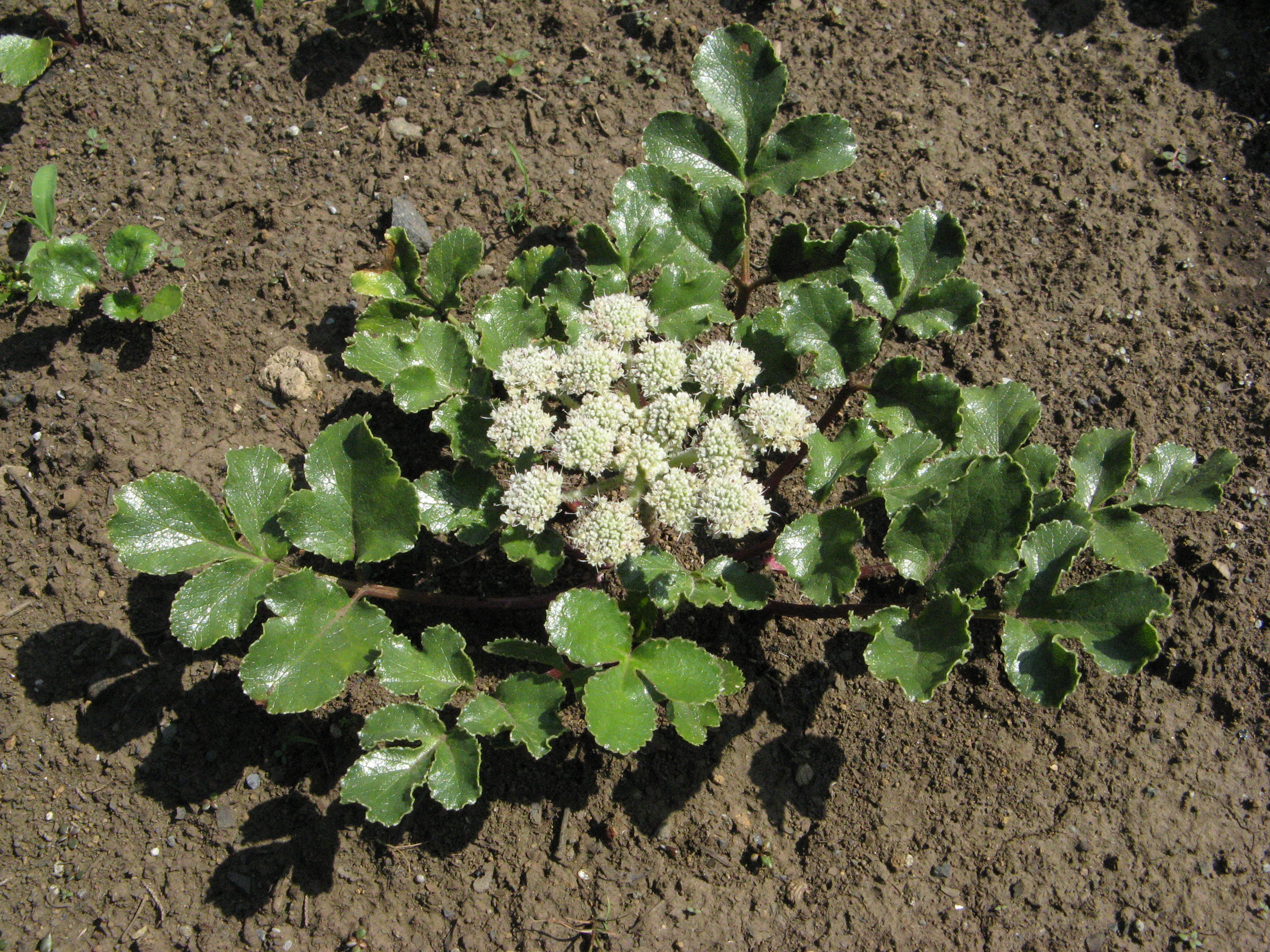

Scientific classification
- Kingdom: Plantae
- Clade: Tracheophytes
- Clade: Angiosperms
- Clade: Eudicots
- Clade: Asterids
- Order: Apiales
- Family: Apiaceae
- Subfamily: Apioideae
- Tribe: Selineae
- Genus: Glehnia; F.Schmidt
- Species: G. littoralis

Binomial name
- Glehnia littoralis (J.G.Cooper) F. Schmidt ex Miq.

Synonyms
- Phellopterus Benth.; Cymopterus littoralis J.G.Cooper; Phellopterus littoralis (J.G.Cooper) F.Schmidt

= Glehnia =

Genus of flowering plants

Glehnia is a genus of plants in the carrot family, Apiaceae. It is monotypic, being represented by the single species, Glehnia littoralis, commonly known as beach silvertop and American silvertop. The genus was named after Baltic German botanist Peter von Glehn.

== Description ==
It is a long-taprooted plant forming a basal patch of leaves, with each leaf made up of several rounded, lobular segments. It reaches a maximum height exceeding .5 metres (1 1/2 feet), with the North American subspecies only reported to reach 6.5 centimetres (2 1/2 inches). The plant's erect stem is topped with an umbel of carrotlike white flowers.

=== Chemistry ===
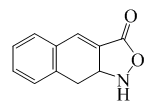
Naphthisoxazole A

The plant contains naphthisoxazole A.

== Taxonomy ==
Two subspecies exist, one in Asia and one in North America; the latter is named leiocarpa.

== Distribution and habitat ==
It is native to eastern Asia, particularly eastern China, Japan, and far-eastern Russia, and western North America from Alaska to northern California. It can be found on sandy beaches and dunes.

== Uses ==
The plant is perhaps best known as a Chinese herbal remedy for cough.
