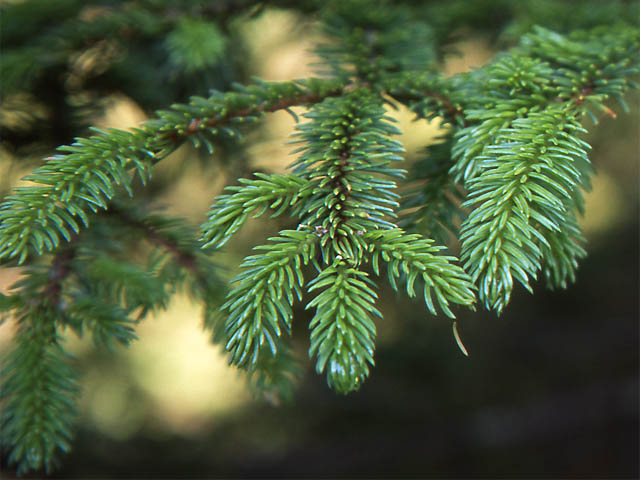
- Picea glehnii

Conservation status
- Least Concern (IUCN 3.1)

Scientific classification
- Kingdom: Plantae
- Clade: Tracheophytes
- Clade: Gymnospermae
- Division: Pinophyta
- Class: Pinopsida
- Order: Pinales
- Family: Pinaceae
- Genus: Picea
- Species: P. glehnii

Binomial name
- Picea glehnii F.Schmidt

= Picea glehnii =

Species of conifer

Picea glehnii, the Sakhalin spruce or Glehn's spruce, is a species of conifer in the family Pinaceae. It was named after a Russian botanist, taxonomist, Sakhalin and Amur river regions explorer, geographer and hydrographer Peter von Glehn (1835—1876), the person who was the first to describe this conifer. In Japan people call this tree アカエゾマツ, which means “red spruce”.

== Natural habitat ==
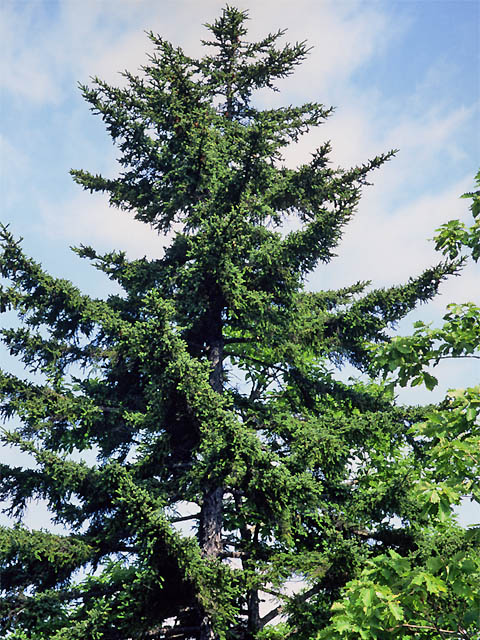
Picea glehnii

The spruce's natural habitat is situated on Hokkaido Island. It also appears on Mount Hayachine of the Kitakami range in the Northern part of Honshu (Iwate prefecture), as well as in the Southern part of Russian island Sakhalin (along Aniva Bay, in the Mereya river valley, near Bolshoye Vavaiskoye lake and Busse lagoon). The tree also grows on Southern Kuril Islands (Kunashir, Shikotan and Southern Iturup).

Glehn's spruce grows within the range of 0 to 1600 meters above sea level in low places and on cold and excessively wet soil on rocky subsoil.

== Description ==
The tree has thick cone-shaped branches with a trunk of about 62–73 centimeters in diameter. Spruces on Sakhalin grow as high as 17 meters, while some specimens growing on Japanese mountains are even 30 meters tall. Old trees’ bark is scaly and placoid and is colored in chocolate brown (this is the feature that distinguishes this species from others). Young sprouts are usually orange or wine red, haired in grooves and on stalk 1 millimeter in length. The buds are usually 3–7 millimeters long, nearly 5 millimeters wide and have a conical or ovoid form. The color of buds is reddish brown and they are slightly covered with resin. Their scales are triangle- or trigonal-shaped with a long awl-like tip.

The tree's needles are about 10 millimeters long and 2,5 millimeters wide. They are four-sided and a bit curved, mature trees have blunt needles, while young ones have pointed bluish-green ones. When a needle is rubbed, it smells harsh.

The cone has an oblong ovoid or oval form with almost flat base. It is 2–4 centimeters thick and 3,6–8,7 centimeters long. Its color is purple or green, brown and dark-red when mature with inversely ovoid seed scale and dark-red and brown base. The light-brown seeds are 2–2,4 centimeters long with yellowish orange wings which are 2–3 times longer than the seed itself.

The tree is shade and frost tolerant. In planting it is well matched with Dahurian larch.

== Hybrids ==
The tree makes a Picea × nothohybrid with Yezo spruce (Picea jezoensis).

== Conservation ==
The spruce is included into the Red Book of Sakhalin region, it is also kept under protection in Japanese national parks, especially in the area of Honshu Island.
