= Nikolai von Glehn =

Baltic German activist

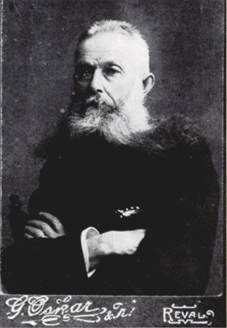
Nikolai von Glehn

Alexander Nikolai von Glehn (16 July 1841 in Jälgimäe Manor, Kreis Harrien, Governorate of Estonia, Russian Empire – 7 September 1923 in Brazil), was a Baltic German landowner and public figure, most notable for being the founder of the town of Nõmme (now part of Tallinn).

He was born into the wealthy Glehn family, and was the brother of Peter von Glehn, a noted botanist. He studied economics, medicine, philosophy and architecture at the University of Tartu and in Germany.

Glehn established a new settlement called Nõmme in the northern part of the lands of his Jälgimäe Manor. In 1873 he gave out the first plots near the railway station which was established a year before on the Tallinn–Paldiski railway (part of the Baltic Railway). In 1917 Nõmme gained the borough rights and in 1926 the town rights, but was merged with Tallinn in 1940.

Glehn also built himself a new Mustamäe Manor (German: Hohenhaupt), nowadays known as the Glehn Castle into Nõmme. The main building ("castle") was finished in 1886 by himself being the architect. The castle is surrounded by a park with several buildings like palm house (1900–1910), observatory tower (1910) and sculptures "Kalevipoeg" (1908), "Crocodile" (1908), all of those created by Glehn himself.

After a departure for Germany in 1918, he went to Brazil to treat his ill son, Manfred von Glehn (1867–1924), in the warm climate.

On 12 November 2011 a sculpture by Seaküla Simson was unveiled beside the footbridge in the centre of Nõmme to honor Glehn.
