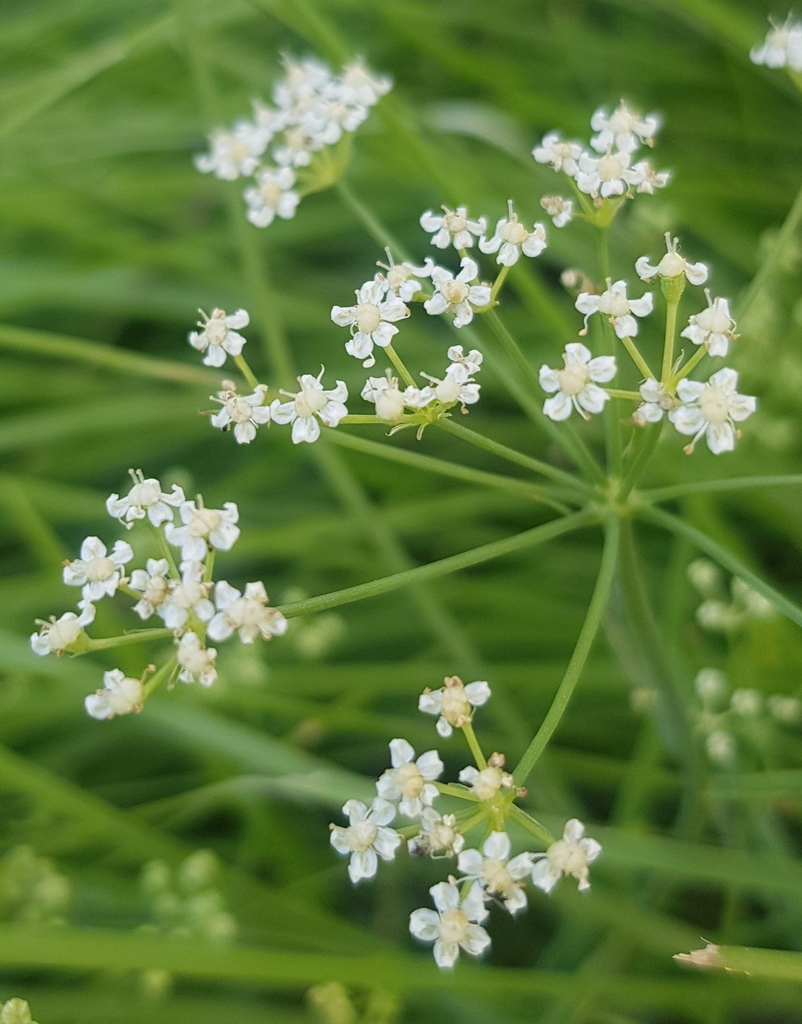

Scientific classification
- Kingdom: Plantae
- Clade: Tracheophytes
- Clade: Angiosperms
- Clade: Eudicots
- Clade: Asterids
- Order: Apiales
- Family: Apiaceae
- Subfamily: Apioideae
- Tribe: Selineae
- Genus: Saposhnikovia; Schischk.
- Species: S. divaricata

Binomial name
- Saposhnikovia divaricata (Turcz.) Schischk.

Synonyms
- Ledebouriella divaricata (Turcz.) Hiroe; Ledebouriella seseloides auct.; Siler divaricatum (Turcz.) Benth. & Hook.f.; Stenocoelium divaricatum Turckz.

= Saposhnikovia =

Genus of plants

Saposhnikovia is a monotypic genus of flowering plants in the family Apiaceae. Its only species is Saposhnikovia divaricata, known as fángfēng 防風 (lit. "protect against the wind") in Chinese, bangpung in Korean, and siler in English. The plant is still frequently referenced under the obsolete genus name Ledebouriella in many online sources devoted to traditional Chinese medicine. It was first described as Stenocoelium divaricatum by Nikolai Turczaninow in 1844, and transferred to Saposhnikovia in 1951.

== Description ==
Glabrous, much-branched, perennial herb, arising from branched, annular, tuberous rootstock up to 2 cm thick, with crown surrounded by fibrous, remnant, sheathing bases of petioles. Height 30–100 cm. Basal leaves numerous, petioles flattened with ovate sheaths, 2–6.5 cm in length; leaf-blades oblong-ovate to broad-ovate, up to 35 x 18 cm (usually smaller), bi- to tripinnatifid, pinnae 3–4 pairs, petiolulate, terminal lobes lanceolate, 3-lobed at apex. Upper leaves simplified with sheathing petioles, reduced upwards, often absent, leading to aphyllous branching. Umbels compound, devoid of involucral bracts, rays 5–9, bracteoles 4–5, pedicels 4–9, flowers white or yellow, petals circa 1.5 mm. Mericarps broadly ovate to oblong, flat, up to 5 x 3mm, tuberculate when young but becoming smooth at maturity, lateral ribs winged. Flowering August–September and fruiting September–October.

== Distribution and habitat ==
Saposhnikovia divaricata is found, in China, in the provinces of Inner Mongolia, Hebei, Shandong, Henan, Shanxi, Shaanxi, Hunan, Heilongjiang, Jilin and Liaoning. The plant also occurs in Russia, Mongolia, Korea and Japan. It grows in grassy and stony slopes at 400–800 m (1,300–2,600 ft), and the margins of rice paddies, roadsides and waste places.

== Harvesting ==
Most of the plants harvested are collected in the provinces of Heilongjiang, Jilin, Inner Mongolia and Hebei. The tuberous rootstocks are harvested in early spring or late autumn (when the plants have yet to flower or have finished flowering) washed, trimmed of basal leaves and fibrous roots, sun-dried until they contain 20% moisture, shredded and then sun-dried again until completely desiccated and ready for storage.

== Phytochemistry ==
The roots and seeds of Saposhnikovia divaricata contain a variety of phytochemicals under basic research, including furocoumarins, furanochromones, polyacetylenes, hyperosides, and terpenes. The major components of the essential oil from roots of S. divaricata are caryophyllene oxide, sabinene, α- and β-pinene, myrtenal, myrtenol, α-terpineol, p-cymene, and nonanoic acid.

== See also ==
- Hallucinogenic plants in Chinese herbals
