= Peter von Glehn =

Baltic German botanist (1835–1876)

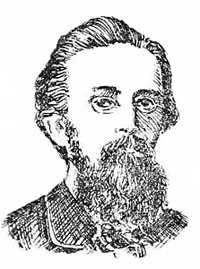

Peter von Glehn (Russian: Пётр Петрович Глен, romanized: Pyotr Petrovič Glen; 8 November [O.S. 27 October] 1835 in Jelgimeggi Manor – 16 April [O.S. 4 April] 1876 in Saint Petersburg) was a Baltic German botanist.

Peter von Glehn was born in the Jelgimeggi manor (Jälgimäe) in 1835, to a Baltic German landowner, member of the Glehn family, Peter von Glehn (1796–1843) and Auguste Caroline Marie Burchart von Bellavary, member of the Burchardt family who took care of the Town Hall Pharmacy in Reval. He had 2 younger brothers: Nikolai (1841–1923), the founder of Nömme (Nõmme), and Len von Glehn, (1844–1920), and 3 sisters: Marie Elisabeth (1840–????), Julie Wilhelmine (1842–1867) and Marie (1843–1884).

He graduated at the Imperial University of Dorpat (Tartu) with a gold medal.

Glehn's Spruce (Picea glehnii), a species of conifer in the family Pinaceae, is named after Peter von Glehn.

== See also ==
- List of Baltic German scientists
